= Józef Urbanowicz =

Soviet and Polish general and political figure

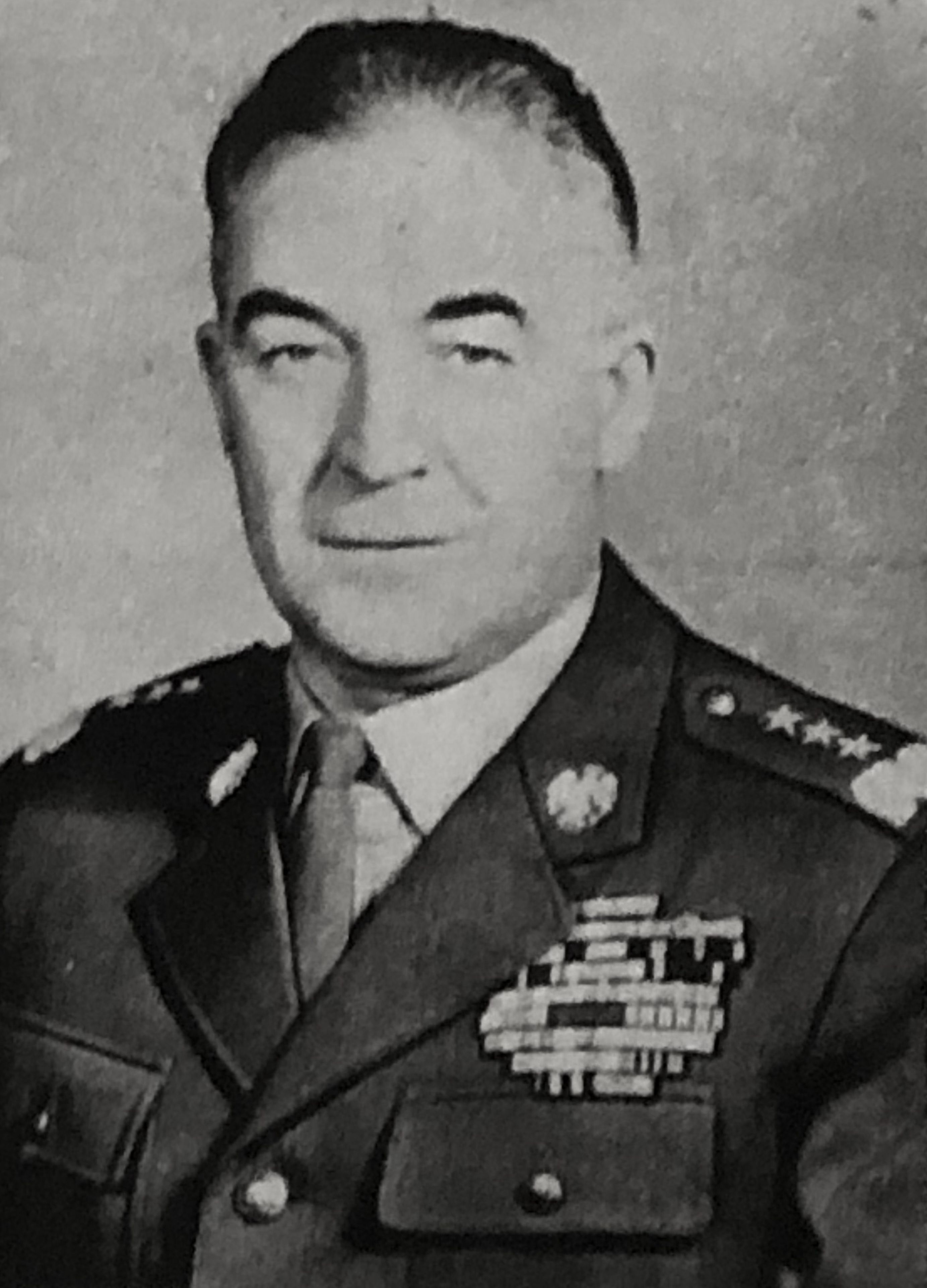
- Urbanowicz in 1973
- Born: 25 March 1916; Oryol Governorate, Russian Empire
- Died: 6 July 1989 (aged 73); Warsaw, Polish People’s Republic
- Burial place: Powązki Military Cemetery
- Military career
- Allegiance: Soviet Union; Polish People's Republic
- Service years: 1941–1988
- Rank: General of the branch
- Other work: Politician, ambassador

Józef Urbanowicz (25 March 1916 – 6 July 1989) was a Soviet and Polish general and political figure. Urbanowicz served as the head of the Main Political Directorate of the Polish Army in (1965–1971) and Vice Minister of Defense of the Polish People's Republic (1968–1984).

== Biography ==
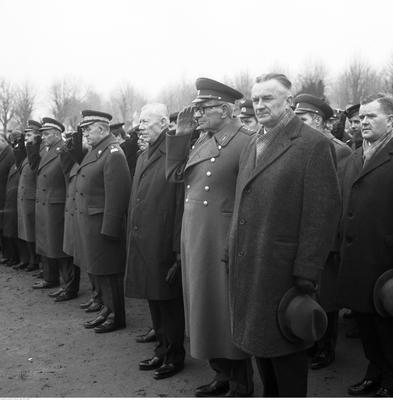
Photograph of celebrations on the 25th anniversary of the liberation of Kołobrzeg by Grażyna Rutowska, 16 March 1970; from the right: Piotr Jaroszewicz, General Stanisław Popławski, Zenon Nowak and Urbanowicz

He was born in the Oryol Governorate in to a Polish working-class family. In 1920 he settled in Riga with his family. After graduating from Polish primary school, he studied for a short time at the Polish Gymnasium in Riga in 1932, from which he dropped out due to lack of funds and communist beliefs. From 1932 to 1935 he was a metalworker. From 1934 to 1938 he studied at the Riga Maritime School. From 1935 to 1938 he was a sailor of a merchant navy. From 1938 to 1939 he served in the Latvian Army in Aluksne In 1939, he joined the Communist Party of Latvia.

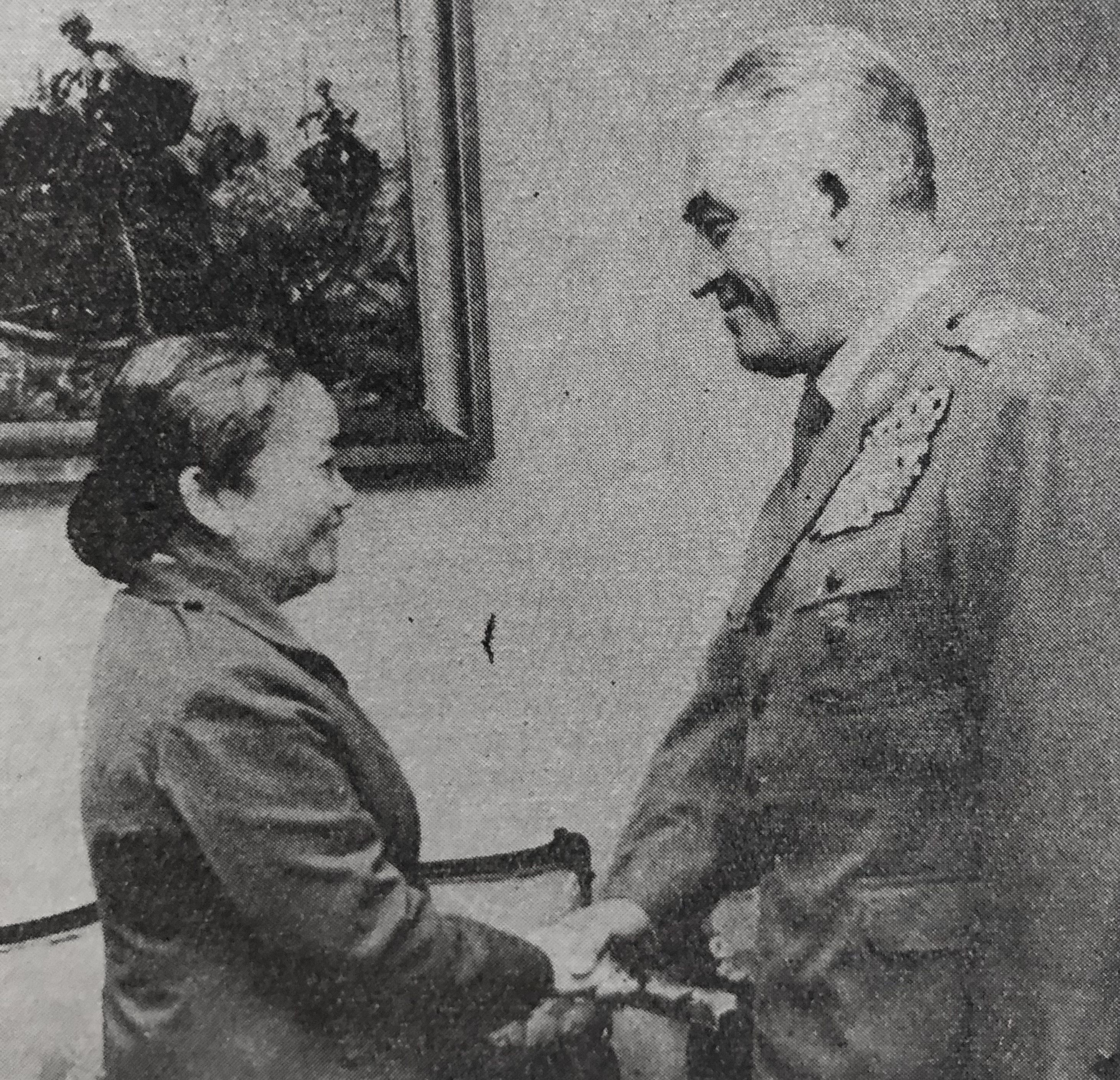
Nguyễn Thị Định with Józef Urbanowicz - 1976

After the Soviet annexation of Latvia, he became the main editor of the Polish newspaper Czerwony Sztandar. When Germany invaded the Soviet Union, he served as an officer in the Red Army near Moscow and Staraya Rusa.

In 1943, with the establishment of the Polish Armed Forces in the Soviet Union he became part of it. From 1943 to 1945 he was Deputy Commander in Political Affairs of the 4th Division.

After the founding of the Polish People's Republic, he served in the Polish People's Army as a member of the Polish Workers' Party. From 1945 to 1952 he was Chief of the Political Division of the Polish Navy, and later held similar positions in the Pomeranian War Area and the General Staff Academy. From 1958 to 1960 he was commander of the Dzerzhinsky Political-Military Academy. Urbanowicz was Deputy from 1960 to 1965 and the Head of the Political Directorate of the Polish People's Army from 1965 to 1971. From 1968 to 1984, Deputy Minister of Defense of Poland. From 1984 to 1987 he was the Ambassador of Poland to Mongolia.

Urbanowicz was a member of the Sejm of the Polish People's Republic from 1965 to 1985 and a member of the Central Committee of the Polish United Workers' Party from 1971 to 1986.

He died in Warsaw and was buried at the Powązki Military Cemetery and received a state funeral.

== Awards ==
- Polish People's Republic:
  - Silver Cross of the Virtuti Militari
  - Order of the Builders of People's Poland
  - Officer' Cross of the Order of Polonia Restituta
  - Knight's Cross of the Order of Polonia Restituta
  - Order of the Banner of Labour, 1st Class
  - Order of the Banner of Labour, 2nd Class
  - Order of the Cross of Grunwald, 3rd Class
  - Gold Cross of Merit
  - Silver Cross of Merit
  - Medal of the 10th Anniversary of People's Poland
  - Medal of the 30th Anniversary of People's Poland
  - Medal of the 40th Anniversary of People's Poland
  - Medal for Warsaw 1939–1945
  - Medal for Oder, Neisse and Baltic
  - Medal of Victory and Freedom 1945
  - Gold Medal of the Armed Forces in the Service of the Fatherland
  - Silver Medal of the Armed Forces in the Service of the Fatherland
  - Bronze Medal of the Armed Forces in the Service of the Fatherland
  - Medal for Participation in the Battle of Berlin
  - Medal of Merit for National Defence
- Soviet Union:
  - Order of Lenin
  - Order of the Red Banner
  - Order of the Friendship of Peoples
  - Medal "For Courage"
  - Medal "For Battle Merit"
  - Medal "For the Defence of Moscow" (1944)
  - Medal "For the Capture of Berlin" (1945)
  - Medal "For the Victory over Germany in the Great Patriotic War 1941–1945" (1945)
  - Jubilee Medal "In Commemoration of the 100th Anniversary of the Birth of Vladimir Ilyich Lenin" (1969)
  - Jubilee Medal "Twenty Years of Victory in the Great Patriotic War 1941-1945" (1965)
  - Jubilee Medal "30 Years of the Soviet Army and Navy" (1948)
  - Jubilee Medal "40 Years of the Armed Forces of the USSR" (1958)
  - Jubilee Medal "50 Years of the Armed Forces of the USSR" (1968)
  - Jubilee Medal "60 Years of the Armed Forces of the USSR"
  - Jubilee Medal "70 Years of the Armed Forces of the USSR"
- Other countries:
  - Gold Patriotic Order of Merit
  - Czechoslovak War Cross 1939–1945

And other awards
