= Bolesław Chocha =

Polish military commander, publicist and military theorist

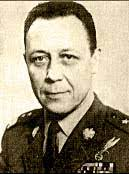
- Born: 6 August 1923; Grodno, Second Polish Republic
- Died: 2 May 1987 (aged 63); Józefów, Polish People's Republic
- Military career
- Allegiance: Polish People's Republic
- Branch: Polish People's Army
- Service years: 1943-1979
- Rank: Generał dywizji (Major general)
- Units: 1st Tadeusz Kościuszko Infantry Division; 6th Pomeranian Airborne Division
- Commands: Commander of the 6th Pomeranian Airborne Division; Chief of Polish General Staff; Deputy Minister of National Defence; Commander of the General Staff Academy
- Conflicts: Second World War
- Awards
- Other work: First Secretary of PZPR in Józefów

Bolesław Chocha (August 6, 1923 – May 2, 1987) was a Polish military commander, publicist, and military theorist. Bolesław held the rank of divisional general in the Polish People's Army and also served as Chief of the General Staff of the Army. In addition to his military career, he was a political and social activist. He was born in Grodno and died in Józefów.

== Biography ==
By the time World War Two had initiated, Bolesław had completed four grades at the state gymnasium and high school named after Adam Mickiewicz in Grodno. Due to his father—Konstanty—constantly engaging in battles with the Red Army, the NKVD deported him and his family to Kazakhstan in February 1940 in retaliation. During his time in Kazakhstan, he worked as a blacksmith and carpenter.

In May 1943, Bolesław joined the Red Army, volunteering for the 1st Tadeusz Kościuszko Infantry Division; he was later promoted to the rank of ensign. He fought as a platoon commander in the machine gun company of the 3rd battalion, 3rd Infantry Regiment [pl]. In the beginning of 1944, he became the deputy commander of the 8th company; later, he completed a battalion command course at the Officers' Infantry School in Ryazan and, as a distinguished graduate, remained in its staff—even after the school was relocated to Lublin—as the head of the head of the scientific department of the heavy machine gun battalion. In September that same year, he was transferred to Staff of the Military District Command No. VII in Lublin, serving there as the inspector of combat training in the department. From March to May 1947, he participated in operations against the Ukrainian Insurgent Army as part of the Vistula Operational Group [pl].

From 1948 to 1951, he studied at the General Staff Academy as a senior lecturer in general tactics. From August 1953, he was the deputy head of the Department of General Tactics and Staff Services, from September 1954, the deputy head of the Department of General Tactics, and from October 1956, the deputy head of the Department of General Tactics and Operational Art for general tactics.

In December 1957, he was awarded the title of Paratrooper of the Airborne Forces of the Armed Forces of the Polish People's Republic. On July 13, 1960, by virtue of a resolution of the Council of State of the Polish People's Republic, he promoted to the rank of brigadier general, later being elevated to the rank of division general by July 30.

== Promotions ==
- Chorąży (Standard-bearer) - 1943
- Podporucznik (Second lieutenant) - 1944
- Porucznik (First lieutenant) - 1945
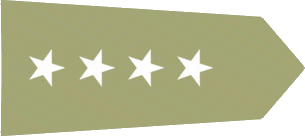
- Kapitan (Captain) - 1946
- Major (Major) - 1948
- Podpułkownik (Lieutenant colonel) - 1952
- Pułkownik (Colonel) - 1957
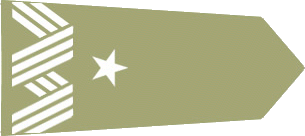
- Generał brygady (Brigadier general) - 1960
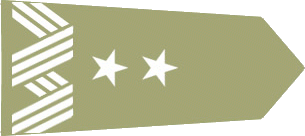
- Generał dywizji (Major general) - 1965

== Awards and decorations ==
- Polish:
  - Order of the Banner of Labour, 1st Class (1968)
  - Order of the Cross of Grunwald, 3rd Class (1970)
  - Officer's Cross of the Order of Polonia Restituta (1963)
  - Knight's Cross of the Order of Polonia Restituta (1958)
  - Cross of Valour (1966)
  - Silver Cross of Merit (twice, 1945, 1946)
  - Silver Medal for Merit on the Field of Glory (twice, 1945, 1946)
  - Medal of the 30th Anniversary of People's Poland (1974)
  - Medal of the 40th Anniversary of People's Poland
  - Medal for Oder, Neisse and Baltic (1947)
  - Gold Medal of the Armed Forces in the Service of the Fatherland (1958)
  - Silver Medal of the Armed Forces in the Service of the Fatherland
  - Medal of the 10th Anniversary of People's Poland
  - Medal for Participation in the Battle of Berlin (1970)
  - Gold Medal of Merit for National Defence (1973)
  - Silver Medal of Merit for National Defence (1968)
  - Bronze Medal of Merit for National Defence (1966)
- Soviet:
  - Order of Lenin (1968)
  - Order of the Red Banner (1973)
  - Medal "For the Victory over Germany in the Great Patriotic War 1941–1945"
  - Jubilee Medal "In Commemoration of the 100th Anniversary of the Birth of Vladimir Ilyich Lenin" (1970)
  - Jubilee Medal "Twenty Years of Victory in the Great Patriotic War 1941–1945"
  - Jubilee Medal "Thirty Years of Victory in the Great Patriotic War 1941–1945" (1975)
  - Jubilee Medal "Forty Years of Victory in the Great Patriotic War 1941–1945" (1985)
  - Jubilee Medal "50 Years of the Armed Forces of the USSR" (1968)
- From other countries:
  - Order of the People's Army with Laurer Wreath (Yugoslavia, 1967)
  - Grand Cross of the Order of the White Rose of Finland (Finland, 1969)
  - 30th Anniversary of the Bulgarian People's Army Medal (Bulgaria, 1974)
