= Florian Siwicki =

Minister of Defence of Poland (1983-1990)

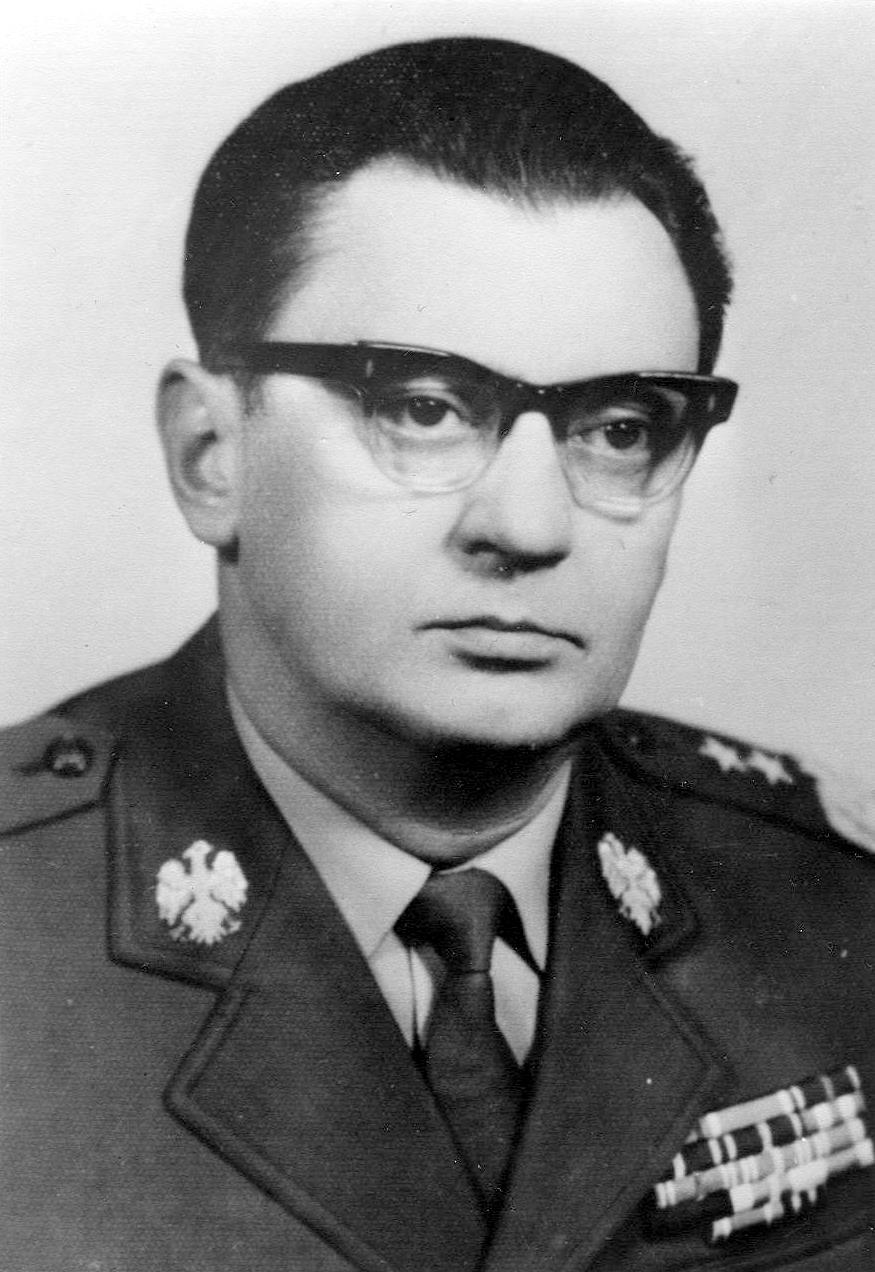
- Major general Florian Siwicki

Minister of National Defence
- In office 22 November 1983 – 6 July 1990
- Prime Minister: Wojciech Jaruzelski; Zbigniew Messner; Mieczysław Rakowski; Czesław Kiszczak; Tadeusz Mazowiecki
- Preceded by: Wojciech Jaruzelski
- Succeeded by: Piotr Kołodziejczyk

Personal details
- Born: 10 January 1925 Łuck, Poland (today Ukraine)
- Died: 11 March 2013 (aged 88) Warsaw, Poland
- Occupation: Politician

Military service
- Allegiance: Poland; Polish People's Republic
- Branch/service: Red Army, Polish People's Army
- Years of service: 1942–1990
- Rank: Generał Armii (General)
- Unit: Motorized infantry (mortar and recoilless rifle)
- Commands: 8th Infantry Division; 2nd Army; Silesian Military District; Chief of General Staff of the Polish Army; Minister of National Defense
- Battles/wars: World War II: Battle of Smolensk; East Pomeranian Offensive; Vistula–Oder Offensive; Prague Offensive; Warsaw Pact invasion of Czechoslovakia; Martial law in Poland

Florian Siwicki (Polish pronunciation: [ˈflɔrjan ɕiˈvit͡skʲi]; 10 January 1925 – 11 March 2013) was a Polish military officer, diplomat and communist politician. He was a generał in the Polish Army and Minister of Defense of Poland from 1983 to 1990.

== Military and political career ==
Son of Elżbieta and Eugeniusz. His father was a non-commissioned officer. In 1930, Eugeniusz Siwicki was transferred to the reserve and moved with his family to village near Rivne. At first, he was the owner of a small, three-hectare farm, and later he was employed as a bookkeeper in the commune office.

In April 1940, his father was arrested by NKVD officers. A month later, Florian and his mother were deported deep into the Soviet Union to the Arkhangelsk region. At the age of 17 he was forced to join the Red Army. From December 1942, he served in the 105 Independent Sapper Battalion, where he became the deputy commander of the platoon. In May 1943 he was in the ranks of the Polish Armed Forces in the USSR. He served in the 1st Tadeusz Kościuszko Infantry Division.

In early 1945, after 5 months of officer training in the Soviet Union, he was commissioned a lieutenant in the Soviet-allied Polish People's Army. He commanded infantry platoons and companies in the East Pomeranian Offensive and the Prague Offensive.

After the war, he continued his military career as an infantry officer and political career as a member and official of the Polish Workers' Party (PPR). In the army he became a "political officer"; he advanced also in the PPR and then the Polish United Workers' Party (PZPR). He was not very close to the Stalinist wing of the party, although dutifully carried out their orders. From 1951 to 1953 he underwent a Command-and-Staff course for Brigade and Division Command at the M. V. Frunze Military Academy in the Soviet Union. Siwicki was later promoted to lieutenant-colonel and commanded an infantry battalion in the Warsaw Military District until 1957. He was promoted to colonel in 1957 and brigadier in 1960. From 1956 to 1959 he was in charge of the Military Intelligence and Police division in the Warsaw Military District. In the course of his career he held a number of senior posts, including military attaché in China from 1959 to 1961, commander of an independent mechanized brigade in the Silesian Military District from 1961 to 1963, commanding officer of the 8th Motorised/Mechanized Infantry Division from 1963 to 1967, commander of the 2nd Polish Army from 1967 to 1972 (including during the Warsaw Pact invasion of Czechoslovakia in 1968), commander of the Silesian Military District from 1972 to 1973 and Chief of General Staff of the Polish Army from 1973 to 1983. Siwicki was a long-serving Minister of National Defense in the governments of Wojciech Jaruzelski, Zbigniew Messner, Mieczysław Rakowski and Tadeusz Mazowiecki (from 1983 to 1990 total). In 1972 he became a candidate member of the Politburo of the PZPR, and in 1980 a full member. Siwicki was appointed to the position of Minister of Defense after Jaruzelski stepped down from that post; he also functioned as Jaruzelski's "top deputy on the defense council". In October 1983, Siwicki was awarded with the Order of the Cross of Grunwald, first class, one of his many decorations.

As agreed in the Round Table talks and during subsequent political developments, Siwicki remained the Minister of Defense in Solidarity-led government of Mazowiecki until July 1990.

== Awards and decorations ==
- Polish:
  - Order of the Builders of People's Poland
  - Order of the Cross of Grunwald, 1st Class (1983)
  - Order of the Banner of Labour, 1st Class (1973)
  - Order of the Banner of Labour, 2nd Class
  - Commander's Cross of the Order of Polonia Restituta
  - Officer's Cross of the Order of Polonia Restituta
  - Gold Cross of Merit
  - Silver Cross of Merit (twice, first in 1946)
  - Medal of the 30th Anniversary of People's Poland
  - Medal of the 40th Anniversary of People's Poland
  - Medal of Victory and Freedom 1945
  - Gold Medal of the Armed Forces in the Service of the Fatherland
  - Silver Medal of the Armed Forces in the Service of the Fatherland
  - Bronze Medal of the Armed Forces in the Service of the Fatherland
  - Medal of the 10th Anniversary of People's Poland
  - Medal for Participation in the Battle of Berlin
  - Gold Medal of Merit for National Defence
  - Silver Medal of Merit for National Defence
  - Bronze Medal of Merit for National Defence
  - Medal of the National Education Commission
  - Gold Badge of Merit in the Protection of Public Order
  - Gold Badge of Merit in the Defense of the Borders of the Polish People's Republic
  - Gold Medal of Merit for the Homeland Defense League
  - Gold Badge of Merit for Civil Defense
  - Gold Decoration of the name of Janek Krasicki
  - Medal of Ludwik Waryński (1988)
  - Badge of the 1000th Anniversary of the Polish State
- Soviet:
  - Order of Lenin (twice, 1968, 1984
  - Order of Friendship of Peoples
  - Medal "For Strengthening of Brotherhood in Arms"
  - Jubilee Medal "Twenty Years of Victory in the Great Patriotic War 1941–1945"
  - Jubilee Medal "Thirty Years of Victory in the Great Patriotic War 1941–1945"
  - Jubilee Medal "Forty Years of Victory in the Great Patriotic War 1941–1945" (1985)
  - Jubilee Medal "60 Years of the Armed Forces of the USSR"
  - Jubilee Medal "70 Years of the Armed Forces of the USSR"
- From other countries:
  - Medal for Strengthening Brotherhood in Arms (Cuba, 1983)
  - Medal of the 30th Anniversary of the Revolutionary Armed Forces (Cuba)
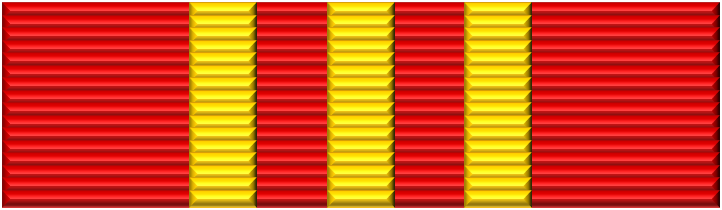
  - Order of Ho Chi Minh (Vietnam)
  - Friendship Order (Vietnam)
  - Order of Tudor Vladimirescu, 1st Class (Romania)
  - 90th Anniversary of the Birth of Georgi Dimitrov Medal (Bulgaria, 1983)
  - 30th Anniversary of the Bulgarian People's Army Medal
  - Medal for Consolidation of Military Friendship (Bulgaria)
  - Medal of 40th Anniversary of Socialist Bulgaria (Bulgaria, 1986)
  - 40th Anniversary of Victory Over Hitler's Fascism Medal (Bulgaria, 1985)
  - Scharnhorst Order (East Germany)
  - Gold Medal Brotherhood in Arms (East Germany)
  - Jubilee Medal 30 Years of the National People's Army (East Germany, 1986)
