= Józef Użycki =

Chief of the Polish General Staff (1983–1990)

Józef Janusz Użycki
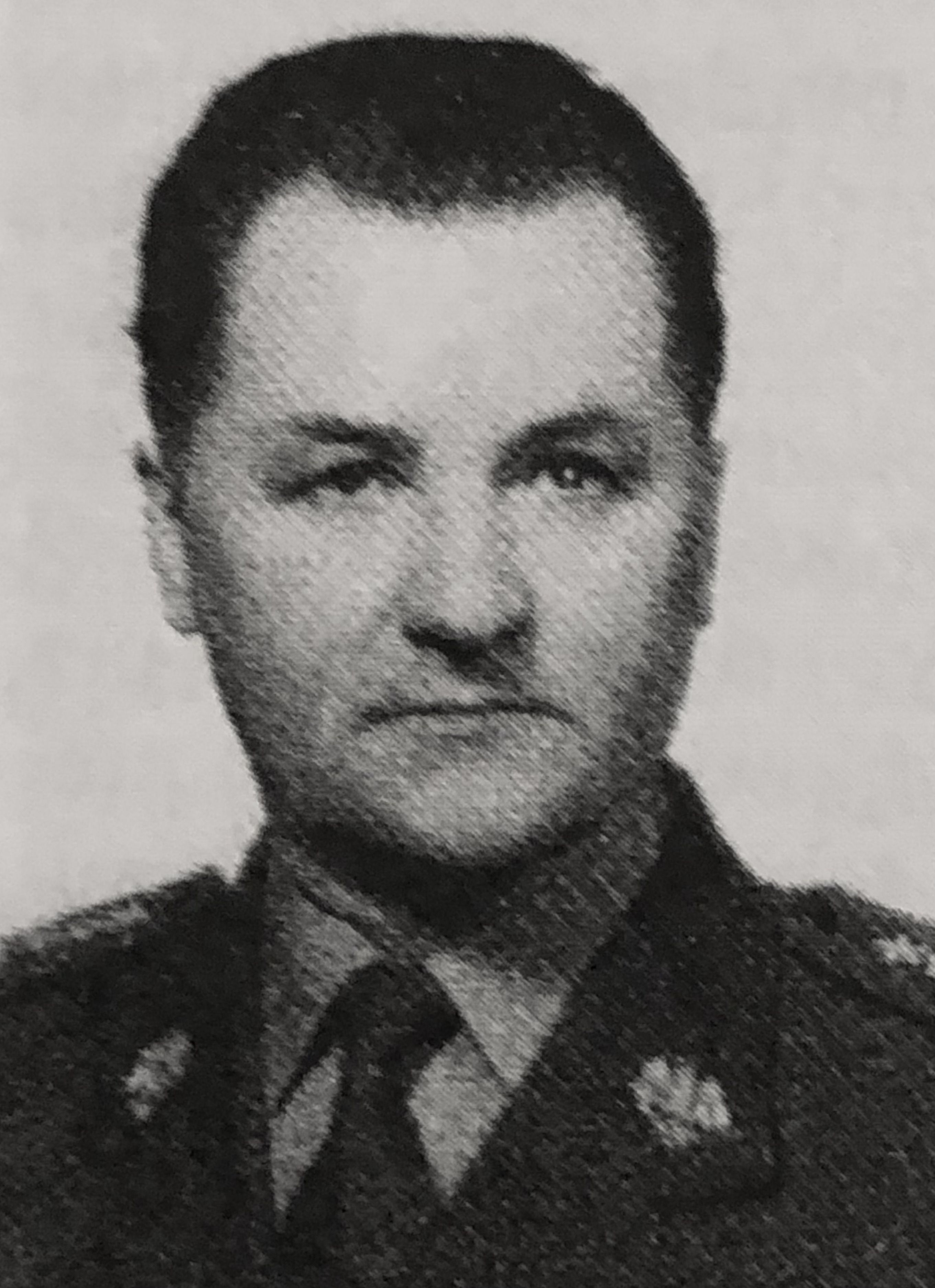
- Born: Józef Użycki; 10 January 1932; Lviv, Poland (today Ukraine)
- Died: 23 December 2022; Warsaw, Poland
- Military career
- Allegiance: Poland; Polish People's Republic
- Branch: Polish People's Army
- Service years: 1952–1990
- Rank: General of the branch
- Commands: 4th Infantry Division; Pomeranian Military District; Chief of General Staff of the Polish Army; Minister of National Defense
- Conflicts: Warsaw Pact invasion of Czechoslovakia; Martial law in Poland
- Awards: Medal of the Armed Forces in the Service of the Fatherland; Medal of the 30th Anniversary of People's Poland; Medal of the 40th Anniversary of People's Poland; Order of Polonia Restituta; Order of the Banner of Work; Cross of Merit (Poland); Gold Medal of Merit for National Defence; Medal of the National Education Commission; Medal for Merit in the Protection of Public Order
- Other work: Politician

Józef Użycki (born 1 December 1932 - 23 December 2022) was a Polish military officer, and communist politician. He was a general in the Polish Army and the Polish General Staff of Poland from 1983 to 1990.

== Life ==
He was born in the village of Kiertyn in Stryi county (now Ukraine), in the Polish Second Republic. In February 1940, he and his family were deported to Siberia to Krasnoyarsk Krai, from where he returned to the country in 1946. After returning, he lived in Gliwice, where he attended high school.

He began his military service in 1950, as a podchorąży, attending Officer Infantry school Number One in Wrocław. In 1952 he was promoted to the rank of podporuchnik, after which he was sent to the commander of the school platoon, and then deputy commander of a company at the 4th Infantry Regiment in Kielce (where he served until October 1954). In 1954-1957 he studied at the General Staff Academy. After graduation, he became chief of staff of a battalion at the 33rd Mechanized Regiment in Nysa (1957-1959). In 1959-1966 he served in the Staff of the Silesian Military District, where he was an officer of the Operational Department. In 1966, he became Chief of Staff/Deputy Commander of the 10th Medium Tank Regiment in Opole.

He commanded this regiment, participating in the Warsaw Pact invasion of Czechoslovakia. During the Armed Forces Inspection, the regiment commanded by him received a very good grade. In 1969, he became chief of staff/deputy commander of the 11th Dresden Armoured Division in Żagań. From 1971 to 1973, he was a student at the Military Academy of General Staff of the Armed Forces of the USSR in Moscow. In 1973, he took command of the 11th Dresden Armoured Division. In this position, in 1974, he was promoted to brigadier general by a resolution of the Polish Council of State. The nomination was presented in Belweder by the President of the Polish Council of State prof. Henryk Jabłoński in the presence of the First Secretary of the Central Committee of the Polish United Workers' Party Edward Gierek. The division he commanded was repeatedly distinguished, including twice in one year by order of the Minister of National Defence. In 1976 he became Chief of Staff/Deputy Commander of the Pomeranian Military District in Bydgoszcz. In 1978, he was appointed commander of this military district, and in case of war commander of the 1st Army. In 1979, he was promoted to Divisional General. In 1983, he became deputy chief of the General Staff of the Polish Army for operations. From 1983 to 1990, he was Chief of the General Staff and Deputy Ministry of National Defense (Poland).

In 1951 he joined the Polish United Workers' Party. In 1963 he became a member of the executive of the OOP of the Operations Department of the Staff of the Silesian Military District, and from 1964 to 1966 he was secretary of the OOP. In April 1975, he sat on the Provincial Committee of the party in Zielona Góra, as well as in the Party Committee of the Silesian Military District. He was a delegate to the 5th, 7th, 8th and 9th Congresses of the Polish United Workers' Party. From 1980 to 1985, he was a member of the 8th term Sejm of the People's Republic of Poland. From December 13, 1981, to July 21, 1983, a member of the Military Council of National Salvation. From 1986 to 1990, he was a member of the Central Committee of the Polish United Workers' Party.

He was the Co-author of the new Polish Defence doctrine, which he presented in January 1990 at the conference of Chiefs of General Staff of European and North American countries in Vienna.

He lived in Warsaw. He was married and had one son.

== Awards ==
- Order of the Banner of Labour, 1st Class
- Commander's Cross of Order of Polonia Restituta
- Knight's Cross of Order of Polonia Restituta
- Golden Cross of Merit
- Silver Cross of Merit
- Medal of the 30th Anniversary of People's Poland
- Medal of the 40th Anniversary of People's Poland
- Golden Medal of the Armed Forces in the Service of the Fatherland
- Silver Medal of the Armed Forces in the Service of the Fatherland
- Bronze Medal of the Armed Forces in the Service of the Fatherland
- Golden Medal of Merit for National Defence
- Silver Medal of Merit for National Defence
- Bronze Medal of Merit for National Defence
- Medal of the National Education Commission
- Golden Badge of Merit for Civil Defense
- Golden Badge "For Merit in Strengthening the Friendship of the Polish People's Republic-the USSR"
- Order of the Red Star
- Medal "For Strengthening of Brotherhood in Arms"
- Jubilee Medal "Forty Years of Victory in the Great Patriotic War 1941–1945"
- Jubilee Medal "60 Years of the Armed Forces of the USSR"
- Jubilee Medal "70 Years of the Armed Forces of the USSR"
