= Jerzy Bordziłowski =

Polish and Soviet military officer and communist politician

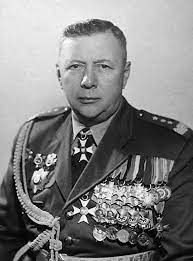
- Born: 16 November 1900; Ostrów Mazowiecka, Russian Empire
- Died: 5 April 1983 (aged 82); Moscow, Russian SFSR, Soviet Union
- Burial place: Powązki Military Cemetery; Warsaw, Poland
- Military career
- Allegiance: Soviet Union; Polish People's Republic
- Branch: Red Army (1919–1944); Polish People's Army (1944–1945)
- Service years: 1919–1983
- Rank: Colonel General; Lieutenant General
- Commands: Polish General Staff
- Conflicts: Polish–Soviet War; World War II

Jerzy Bordziłowski (Russian: Юрий Вячеславович Бордзиловский; 16 November 1900 – 5 April 1983) was a Polish and Soviet military officer and communist politician.

== Biography ==
Born in Ostrów Mazowiecka to a Polish doctor serving in the Russian Imperial Army, he spent his childhood in Kherson. In 1919 he joined the Red Army and fought against Poland during the Polish-Bolshevist War and in the Russian Civil War. After the outbreak of Nazi-Soviet War he was promoted to the rank of Colonel and became the chief inspector of engineers and sappers of the 21st Army. He took part in the Battle of Stalingrad and in September 1942 was promoted to the rank of General and became the deputy commanding officer of the Voronezh Front.

On 24 September 1944 he was dispatched by his Soviet superiors to join the Polish Army along with a number of high-ranking Soviet officers of Polish extraction. He commanded all engineering troops of the First Polish Army. Shortly after World War II ended, on 11 July 1945, he was promoted to the rank of Lieutenant General, and became the head of engineering troops of the Polish Armed Forces.

In that capacity he was also the president of Legia Warsaw sports club. On 23 March 1954 he became the Chief of General Staff and deputy Minister of National Defence. In that capacity he was responsible for the bloody quelling of the Poznań 1956 protests. Between 1952 and 1956 he was also briefly a member of the façade Sejm. In March 1968 he was recalled back to the USSR and spent the remainder of his career at various high-ranking posts in the Soviet Army. He died 5 April 1983 in Moscow and was buried at the Kuntsevo Cemetery.

== Awards and decorations ==
- Polish:
  - Grand Cross of Order of Polonia Restituta (1968)
  - Order of the Banner of Labour, 1st Class (twice)
  - Commander's Cross with Star of Order of Polonia Restituta (1954)
  - Commander's Cross of Order of Polonia Restituta (twice, 1945, 1973)
  - Order of the Cross of Grunwald, 3rd Class (11 May 1945)
  - Officer's Cross of Order of Polonia Restituta
  - Knight's Cross of Order of Polonia Restituta
  - Silver Cross of Virtuti Militari (1945)
  - Golden Cross of Merit (twice, 1946, 1947)
  - Cross of Valour (20 July 1946)
  - Silver Medal of the Armed Forces in the Service of the Fatherland (1954)
  - Bronze Medal of Merit for National Defence
  - Medal for Participation in the Battle of Berlin (1966)
- Soviet:
  - Order of Lenin (twice)
  - Order of the October Revolution (14 November 1980)
  - Order of the Red Banner (six times)
  - Order of Bogdan Khmelnitsky, 1st Class
  - Order of Kutuzov, 2nd Class (10 April 1945)
  - Order of the Patriotic War, 1st Class (31 May 1945)
  - Medal "For the Defence of Stalingrad"
  - Medal "For the Liberation of Warsaw"
  - Medal "For the Victory over Germany in the Great Patriotic War 1941–1945"
  - Jubilee Medal "Twenty Years of Victory in the Great Patriotic War 1941–1945"
  - Jubilee Medal "Thirty Years of Victory in the Great Patriotic War 1941–1945"
  - Jubilee Medal "XX Years of the Workers' and Peasants' Red Army"
  - Jubilee Medal "30 Years of the Soviet Army and Navy"
  - Jubilee Medal "40 Years of the Armed Forces of the USSR"
  - Jubilee Medal "50 Years of the Armed Forces of the USSR"
  - Jubilee Medal "60 Years of the Armed Forces of the USSR"
