= Vladislav Korchits =

Soviet and Polish general (1893–1966)

Władysław Korczyc
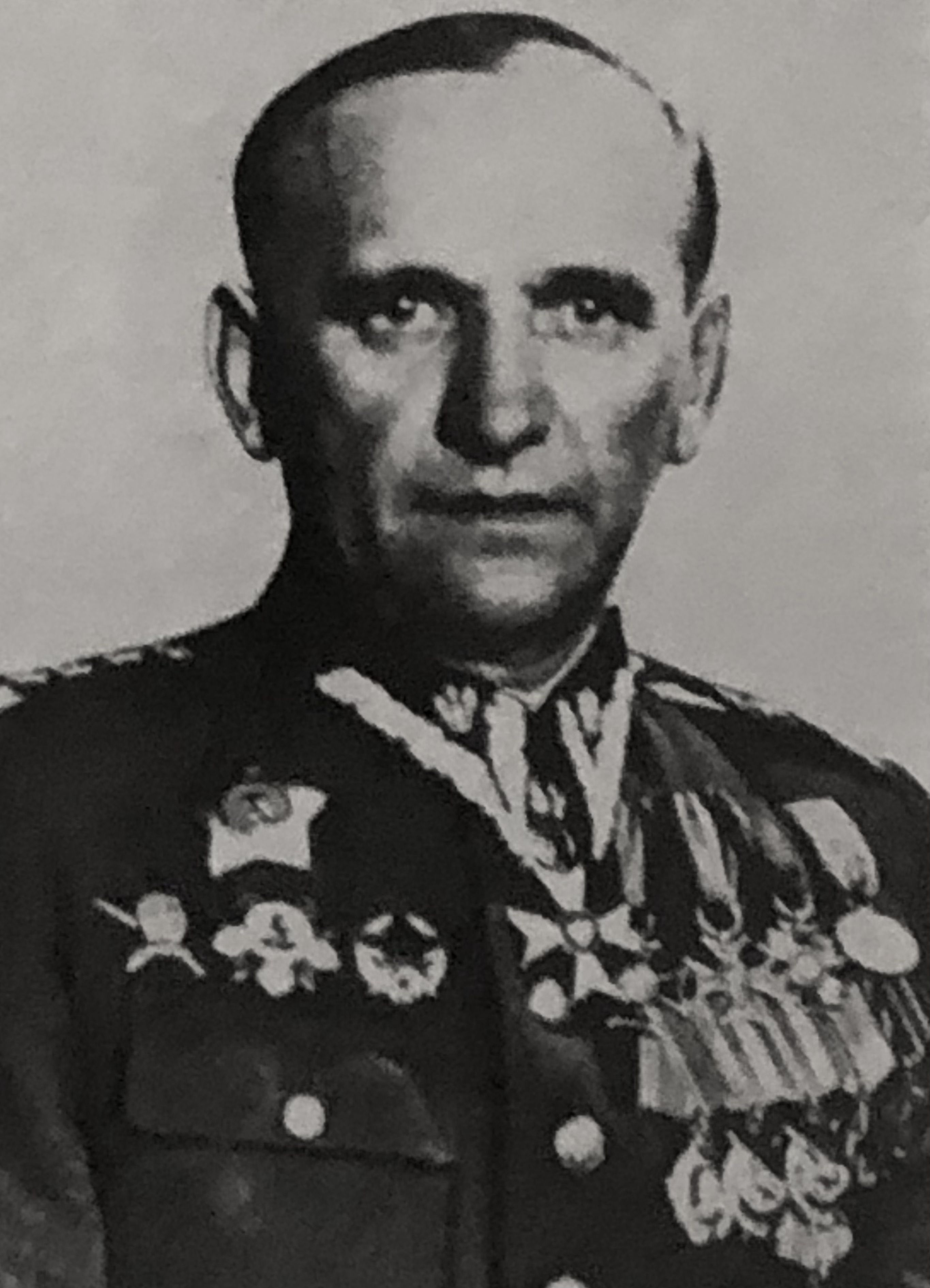
- Born: 1 September 1893; Bogdanowicze, Russian Empire
- Died: 17 October 1966 (aged 73); Moscow, USSR
- Burial place: Novodevichy Cemetery, Moscow
- Military career
- Allegiance: Russian Empire, USSR, Polish People's Republic
- Branch: Russian Imperial Army, Red Army, Polish People's Army
- Service years: 1914–1954
- Rank: Generał broni (Lieutenant general); Colonel general
- Nickname: Владислав Викентиевич Корчиц
- Unit: First Polish Army
- Commands: Chief of Staff of the 1st Polish Army; Chief of Polish General Staff; Deputy Minister of National Defence
- Conflicts: First World War; Russian Civil War; Polish-Soviet War; Second World War
- Awards

Vladislav Vikentyevich Korchits (Polish: Władysław Korczyc) (1 September 1893 – 17 October 1966) was a Soviet and Polish general.

He supported the Bolshevik side during the Russian Revolution, joining the Red Army. He participated in the Polish-Soviet War. In the interwar period he graduated from the Mikhail Frunze Military Academy. He was placed under investigation during 1938–1940, i.e., during the Great Purge, but the accusations were dropped and he was reinstated afterward. He took part in World War II. From 1944 he was attached to the Polish Armed Forces in the East. After the war he remained in the People's Republic of Poland. He served in the Polish People's Army as the chief of Polish General Staff from 1 January 1945 to 18 January 1954. While in Poland, he joined the Polish Workers' Party, was the Deputy Minister of National Defense (1949/1950-?), and the deputy to the Polish parliament (Sejm) for the term 1952–1956. In 1954 he retired and returned to the Soviet Union. He died in Moscow.

== Awards and decorations ==
- Polish:
  - Knight's Cross of Virtuti Militari (11 May 1945)
  - Commander's Cross with Star of the Order of Polonia Restituta
  - Order of the Cross of Grunwald, 2nd Class (6 September 1946)
  - Medal for Warsaw 1939–1945 (1946)
  - Medal for Oder, Neisse and Baltic
  - Medal of Victory and Freedom 1945
- Soviet:
  - Order of Lenin (21 February 1945)
  - Order of the Red Banner (three times)
  - Order of Suvorov, 1st Class (9 May 1945)
  - Order of Kutuzov, 2nd Class (4 June 1944)
  - Order of the Red Star
  - Medal "For the Capture of Berlin"
  - Medal "For the Victory over Germany in the Great Patriotic War 1941–1945"
  - Jubilee Medal "Twenty Years of Victory in the Great Patriotic War 1941–1945"
  - Medal "For the Liberation of Warsaw"
  - Jubilee Medal "XX Years of the Workers' and Peasants' Red Army"
  - Jubilee Medal "30 Years of the Soviet Army and Navy"
  - Jubilee Medal "40 Years of the Armed Forces of the USSR"
- From other countries:
  - Gold Star 1st Class of the Military Order of the White Lion (Czechoslovakia, 1949)
  - Order of the Partisan Star, 1st Class (Yugoslavia, 1946)
  - Medal for Bravery (Yugoslavia, 1946)
