= Henryk Szumski =

Polish general

General Henryk Szumski
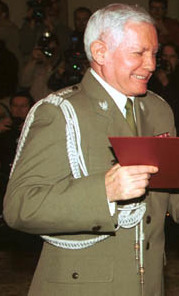

Chief of the Polish General Staff
- In office 10 March 1997 – 29 September 2000
- Preceded by: Tadeusz Wilecki
- Succeeded by: Czesław Piątas

Personal details
- Born: 6 April 1941 Poltulice, Poland
- Died: 30 January 2012 Komorów, Poland

Military service
- Allegiance: Poland
- Years of service: 1964–2000
- Rank: General

Henryk Szumski (6 April 1941 – 30 January 2012) was a Polish general, Chief of the General Staff of the Polish Armed Forces between 1997 and 2000.

== Life ==
=== Education ===
He is a graduate of the Military Academy of the Armored Forces in Poznań (1961–1964). Between 1968 and 1971 he participated in courses organised by the General Staff Academy in Rembertów. In 1980 he graduated from General Staff Academy of Soviet Armed Forces.

=== Military career ===
After graduation in 1980 he became the commander of the 12th Mechanised Division in Szczecin. In the years 1984-1986 Szumski was serving as chief of Pomeranian Military District. Subsequently, he took the position of deputy chief of General Staff of Polish Armed Forces for Operations. Between 1987 and 1989 he was a commander of Silesian Military District. Till 1996 Szumski held various high positions within the General Staff.

From 1996 to 1997 he worked at National Security Bureau where he was i.a. responsible for conceptual works on new model of Poland’s Armed Forces.

On 10 march 1997 he was appointed by Polish President Aleksander Kwaśniewski as Chief of the General Staff of the Polish Armed Forces. He held this position till 28 September 2000.

In 2000 he left the army and became a member of National Security Council.

=== Death ===
He died on 30 January 2012 after being attacked with a knife by his own son.

On 9 February 2012 Henryk Szumski was buried with military honours at the Powązki Military Cemetery in Warsaw.

== Promotions ==
- Podporucznik (Second Lieutenant) – 1964
- Porucznik (Lieutenant) – 1967
- Kapitan (Captain) – 1971
- Major (Major) – 1973
- Podpułkownik (Lieutenant colonel) – 1976
- Pułkownik (Colonel) – 1980
- Generał brygady (Brigadier general) – 1983
- Generał dywizji (Major general) – 1988
- Generał broni (Lieutenant general) – 1997

== Awards and decorations ==
- Commander's Cross with Star of the Order of Polonia Restituta (2000)
- Knight's Cross of the Order of Polonia Restituta (1981)
- Order of the Banner of Labour, 2nd Class (1989)
- Golden Cross of Merit
- Silver Cross of Merit
- Golden Medal of the Armed Forces in the Service of the Fatherland (1984)
- Silver Medal of the Armed Forces in the Service of the Fatherland
- Bronze Medal of the Armed Forces in the Service of the Fatherland
- Golden Medal of Merit for National Defence (1982)
- Silver Medal of Merit for National Defence
- Bronze Medal of Merit for National Defence
- Medal „Milito Pro Christo” (2012)
- Commander of Legion of Honour (France, 2000)
- Cross of Honour of the Bundeswehr in Gold (Germany, 2998)
- Cross of Military Merit, white decoration (Spain, 1999)
- Grand Officer of Order of Merit of the Italian Republic (Italy, 2000)
- Commander of Legion of Merit (US, 1999)
- Commander's Cross with Star of Hungarian Order of Merit (Hungary, 1999)
- Order of the Red Star (USSR, 1984)
