= Mieczysław Cieniuch =

Polish general

General Mieczysław Cieniuch
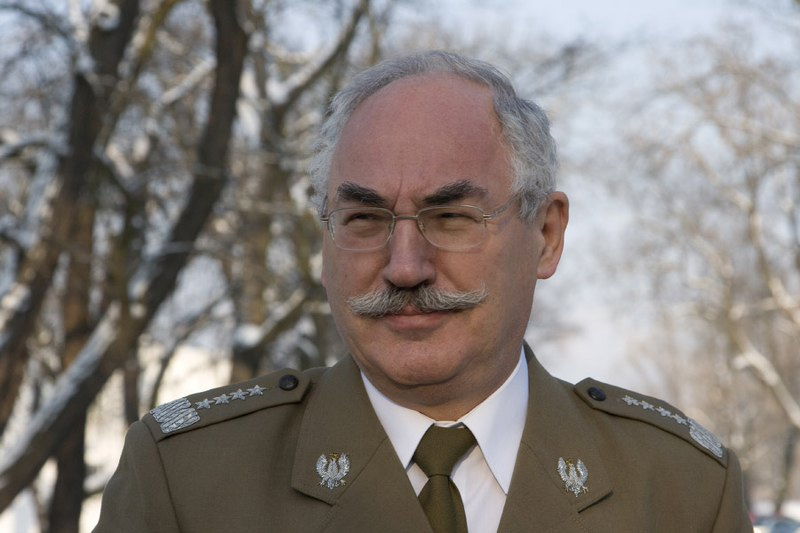

Chief of the Polish General Staff
- In office 7 May 2010 – 6 May 2013
- Preceded by: Franciszek Gągor
- Succeeded by: Mieczysław Gocuł

Personal details
- Born: 24 January 1951 (age 75) Bydgoszcz, Poland

Military service
- Allegiance: Poland
- Years of service: 1970–2013
- Rank: Generał (General)

Mieczysław Cieniuch (born 24 January 1951) is a Polish general, who served as Chief of the General Staff of the Polish Armed Forces from 7 May 2010 till 6 May 2013. Former Ambassador of the Republic of Poland to Turkey.

== Life ==
=== Education ===
He is a graduate of the Military Academy of the Armored Forces in Poznań (1970–1974). He also received military education at Military Armoured Forces Academy in Moscow (1980–1982), Military Academy of the General Staff of the Armed Forces of Russia (1990–1992) and Industrial College of the Armed Forces at the National Defense University in Washington (1999–2000).

=== Military career ===
Cieniuch began his military career in Polish People's Army as a platoon leader with the 60th Armoured Regiment in Elbląg (16th Armoured Division). Later he became company commander and chief of staff within the aforementioned unit. Later between the years 1985–1988 he served as the commander of the 68th Medium Armour Regiment. In 1992 he was appointed chief of operational division of Pomeranian Military District. Between 1996 and 1998 he served as the commander of the 8th Coastal Defence Division.

Since 1998 he performed his duties at General Staff of the Polish Armed Forces. On 15 August 2001 he was promoted to divisional general Two years later he received promotion to the rank of general of the branch For a short period of time he served as Acting Chief of the General Staff. In 2006 Cieniuch became Poland’s military representative to the military committees of North Atlantic Treaty Organization and the European Union. Since 2019 he became the advisor of Minister of National Defence Bogdan Klich.

On 7 May 2010 he was appointed by Polish President Bronisław Komorowski as Chief of the General Staff of the Polish Armed Forces (replacing Franciszek Gągor who died in Polish Air Force Flight 101 crash in Smolensk, Russia). On 15 August of the same year, he was promoted to the rank of General.

After retirement from active service, Mieczysław Cieniuch was appointed Poland’s ambassador to Turkey (2013–2016).

=== Personal life ===
Married to Danuta. The couple have one son.

== Awards and decorations ==
- Commander's Cross of Order of Polonia Restituta (2013)
- Officer's Cross of Order of Polonia Restituta (2002)
- Knight's Cross of Order of Polonia Restituta (1995)
- Golden Cross of Merit
- Silver Cross of Merit
- Military Cross of Merit (2010)
- Golden Medal for Long Service
- Golden Medal of the Armed Forces in the Service of the Fatherland
- Silver Medal of the Armed Forces in the Service of the Fatherland
- Bronze Medal of the Armed Forces in the Service of the Fatherland
- Golden Medal of Merit for National Defence
- Silver Medal of Merit for National Defence
- Bronze Medal of Merit for National Defence
- Medal of the 100th Anniversary of the Establishment of the Polish General Staff (2018)
- Medal of Merit for the Association of Veterans of UN Peace Missions (2011)
- Order of the Cross of the Eagle, 1st Class (Estonia, 2014)
- Commander of Legion of Honour (France, 2013)
- Commander with Star of Royal Norwegian Order of Merit (Norway, 2012)
- Commander of Legion of Merit (United States, 2012)
- Medal "For Support to the Armed Forces of Ukraine" (Ukraine, 2009)
