= Wiesław Kukuła =

Polish general

General Wiesław Kukuła
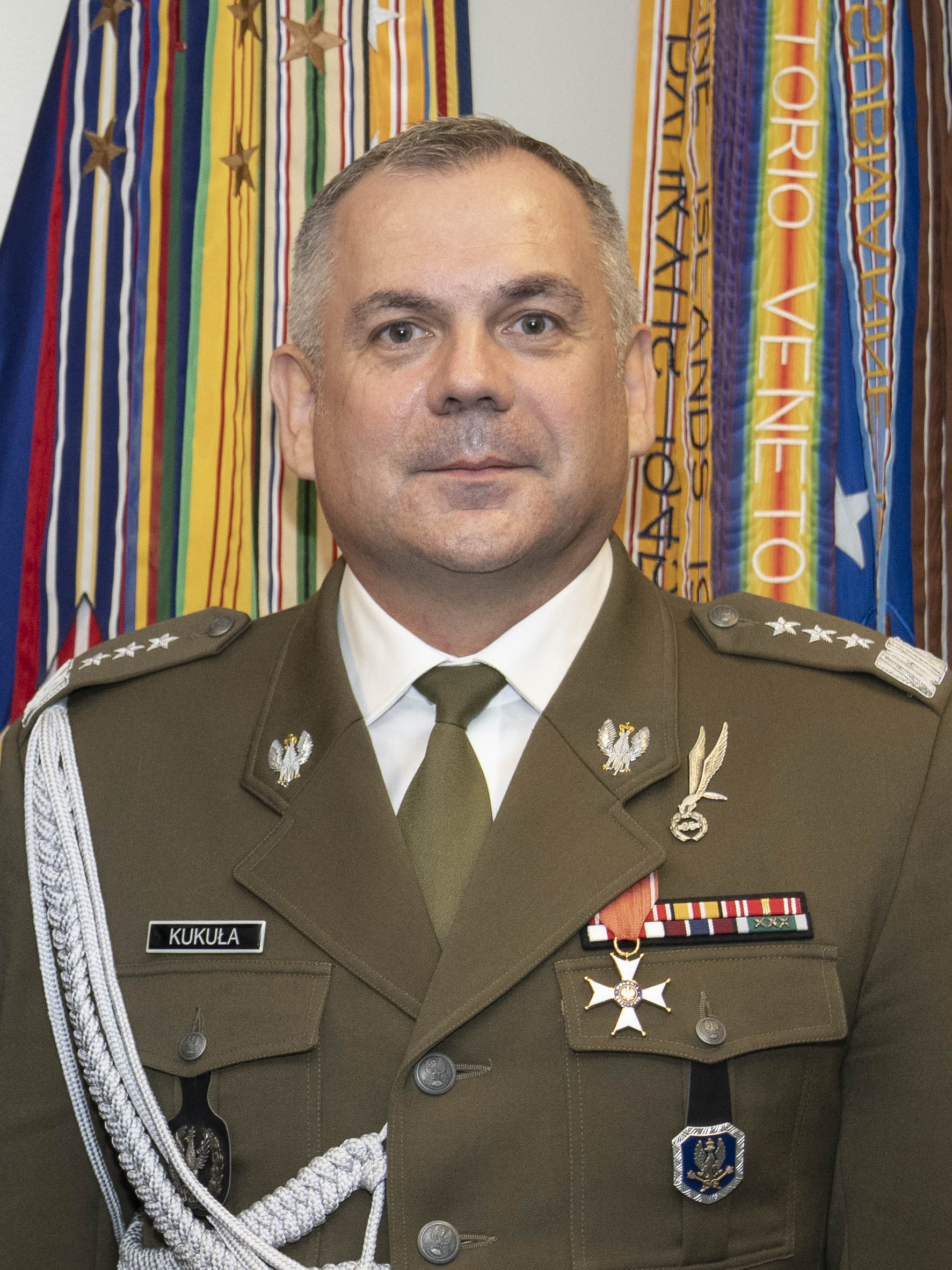

Chief of the Polish General Staff
- Incumbent
- Assumed office 10 October 2023
- Preceded by: Rajmund Andrzejczak

Personal details
- Born: 16 March 1972 (age 54) Częstochowa, Poland
- Education: Military University of Technology in Warsaw; War Studies Academy

Military service
- Allegiance: Poland
- Years of service: 1992–present
- Rank: General

Wiesław Marian Kukuła (IPA: [ˈvjɛ.swaf ˈma.rjan kuˈku.wa]; born 16 March 1972) is a Polish general, serving as Chief of the General Staff of the Polish Armed Forces.

== Education ==
He is a graduate of the Higher Officer School of Signal Forces in Zegrze and the Military University of Technology in Warsaw. He also graduated in defense policy from the Warsaw War Studies Academy.

== Military career ==
In 1996, after being promoted to 2nd lieutenant, he served in the 1st Special Forces Regiment where he held positions from platoon leader to the chief of staff of the unit. During his service in the unit, he was sent to serve as part of the Polish Military Contingent in Iraq. In 2006 he was appointed to the position in the Special Operations Forces Command. Six years later he took over the command of the Special Forces Group.

On September 20, 2016, was appointed as the Commander of the Territorial Defence Forces. On February 6, 2023, he was appointed as the General Commander of the Armed Forces. On October 10, 2023, he became the Chief of the General Staff of the Polish Army. On November 9, 2023, he was appointed by the President of the Republic of Poland to the rank of general.

== Promotions ==
- Podporucznik (Second lieutenant) - 1996
- Porucznik (First lieutenant) - 1999
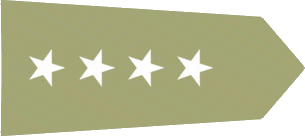
- Kapitan (Captain) - 2003
- Major (Major) - 2004
- Podpułkownik (Lieutenant colonel) - 2006
- Pułkownik (Colonel) - 2008
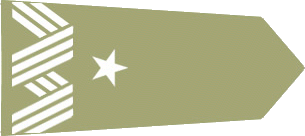
- Generał brygady (Brigadier general) - 29 November 2016
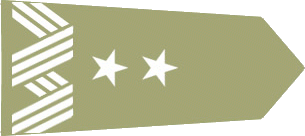
- Generał dywizji (Major general) - 15 August 2018
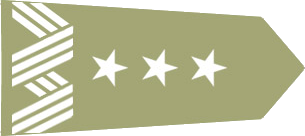
- Generał broni (Lieutenant general) - 11 November 2021
- Generał (General) - 9 November 2023

== Awards and decorations ==
- Knight's Cross of Order of Polonia Restituta
- Star of Iraq
- Golden Medal of the Armed Forces in the Service of the Fatherland
- Bronze Medal of the Armed Forces in the Service of the Fatherland
- Golden Medal of Merit for National Defence
- Silver Medal of Merit for National Defence
- Bronze Medal of Merit for National Defence
- Medal of the General Staff of the Polish Army
- Pro Patria Medal
- Medal Pro Bono Poloniae
- Cross of the 30th Anniversary of the Military Ordinariate
- Medal of the Thirtieth Anniversary of the Establishment of the Border Guard
- Commander of Legion of Merit
