= Franciszek Gągor =

Polish general (1951-2010)

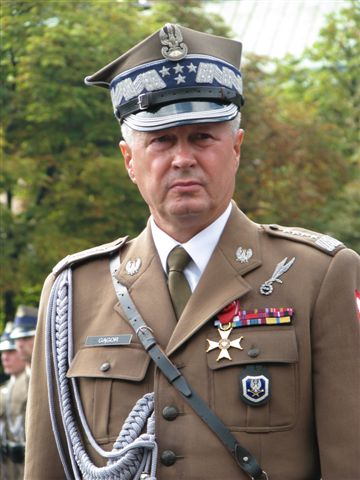
- General Gągor during the Polish Armed Forces Day celebrations in Warsaw on 15 August 2008.
- Born: 8 September 1951; Koniuszowa, Poland
- Died: 10 April 2010 (aged 58) Smolensk, Russia
- Allegiance: Poland
- Branch: Polish Armed Forces
- Service years: 1973–2010
- Rank: General
- Commands: Chief of the General Staff of the Polish Armed Forces
- Awards: Officer's Cross of the Order of Polonia Restituta; Cavalier's Cross of the Order of Polonia Restituta; Golden Cross of Merit; Golden Military Service Medal; UN Medal in the Service of Peace; Legion of Merit - Commander (United States); French Legion of Honor

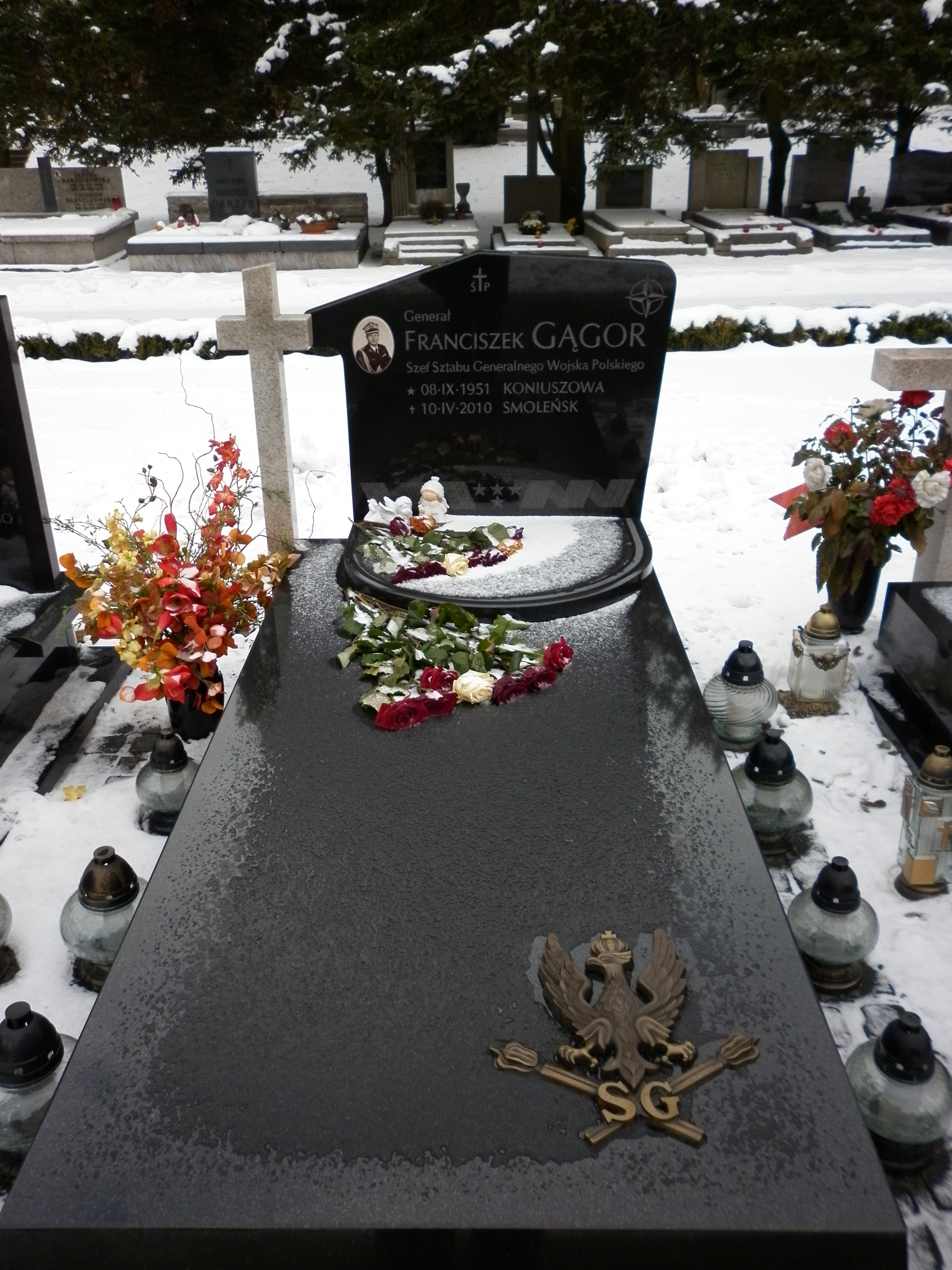
Grave of Franciszek Gągor at Military Powązki Cemetery, 2011

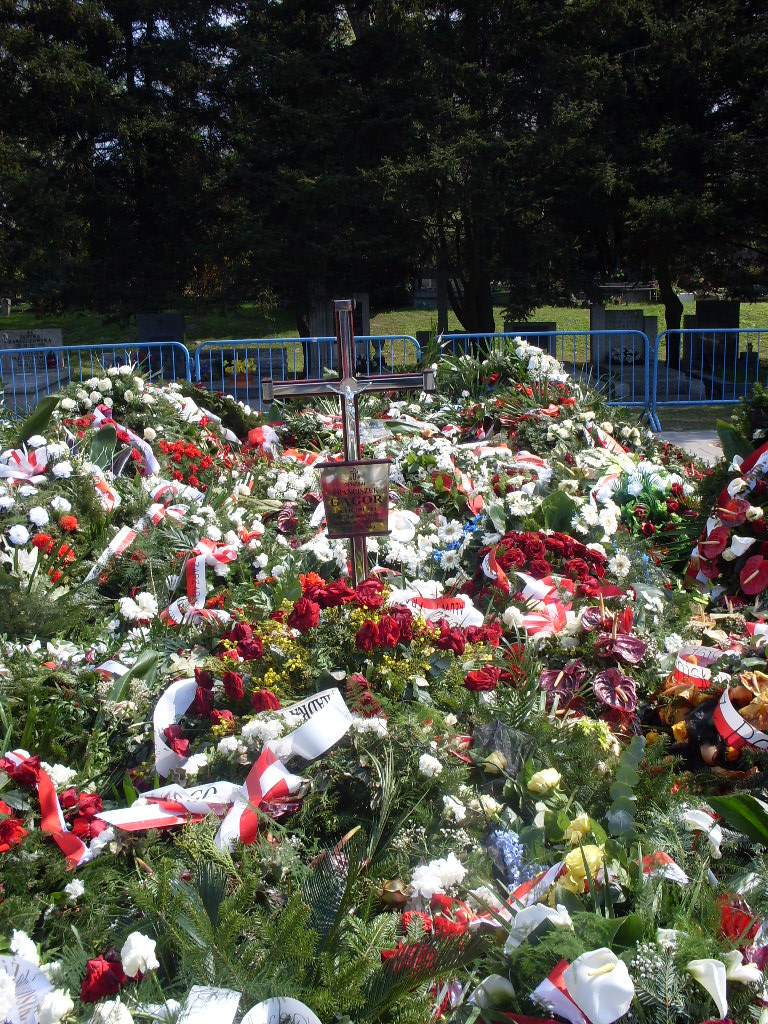
Grave of Franciszek Gągor after burial

Franciszek Gągor (8 September 1951 – 10 April 2010) was a Polish general, Chief of the General Staff of the Polish Armed Forces between 2006 and 2010.

He died in the 2010 Polish Air Force Tu-154 crash near Smolensk with the President of Poland Lech Kaczyński.

== Life and education ==
Gągor was born in 1951 in Koniuszowa near Nowy Sącz.

He attended the Artillery Officers' College at Wrocław in 1973. He also held qualifications at the Adam Mickiewicz University in Poznań (1983 – Master of Arts degree in English philology); the National Defence University in Warsaw (1998 – doctorate in military science); the NATO Defense College (2001), and the National Defense University (2002) in Washington DC.

== Military service ==
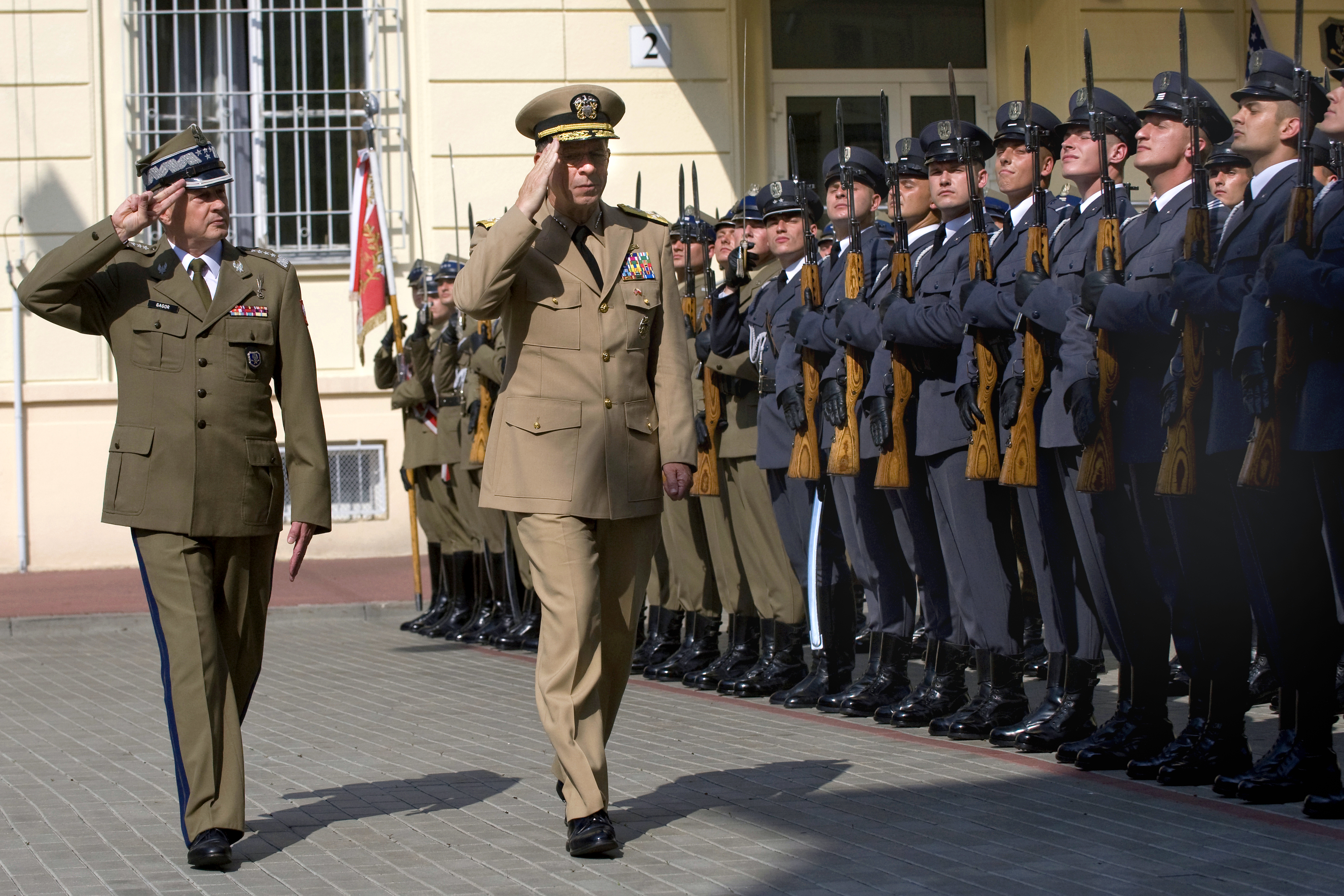
Gągor with Mike Mullen.

He served in the 2nd Tank Regiment in the 1973 as an officer in a Self-Propelled Artillery unit. Afterwards, he became an operations and executive officer responsible for planning and operational activities in United Nations missions.

In 1978 he was posted to the Mechanized Infantry Officer College in Wrocław, where he lectured on preparations and training of Polish contingents designated for peacekeeping operations until 1988 and, during that time, took an active part in UNDOF operations (1980–1981 and 1985–1986) as an operations officer.

Between 1988 and 1990 General Gągor served at UNDOF HQ as Deputy Chief of Logistics.

In 1991 he was an executive officer/second-in-command at the Polish Military Contingent for Desert Storm Operation. He later became the Deputy Sector Commander of UN Iraq-Kuwait Observation mission UNIKOM between 1991 and 1992.

In 1993, as a Colonel, he became the Chief of Polish Armed Forces Peacekeeping Division of the Polish Armed Forces.

He was a key member of the Polish Armed Forces preparations team for Polish accession to NATO, taking care of initial and first rounds of NATO Defence Planning for Poland.

He was promoted to the rank of brigadier general in 1997. In 2002 he was appointed Head of Mission and Force Commander of UNIKOM, the United Nations Peacekeeping Operation in Iraq and Kuwait, where he undertook the successful evacuation of the Mission from the demilitarized zone between Iraq and Kuwait in March 2003, prior to the invasion of Iraq by the United States-led coalition in the second Gulf War. In August 2003, he returned to UNDOF after being appointed by then UN Secretary General Kofi Annan as its head of mission and force commander.

On 27 February 2006, Gągor was made Chief of General Staff of the Polish Armed Forces upon appointment by the President of Poland. He was promoted to General on 3 May 2006.

Along with Krzysztof Paszkowski, he wrote the book: "Defense Doctrine of the Polish Republic for Peacekeeping Operations." Gen. Gągor is an author of numerous articles and publications on military affairs and co-operation, defence transformation and armed forces modernization. While General Gagor always wanted to become United Nations Military Advisor to the Secretary General, he was promoted to more senior positions in his national service instead.

== Personal life ==
He was fluent in English, and communicated in French and Russian. He had an interest in history, English literature, skiing, tennis, volleyball and jogging. He was married to Lucyna and has two children, Katarzyna and Michał.

== Promotions ==
- Podporucznik (Second lieutenant) - 1973
- Porucznik (First lieutenant) - 1976
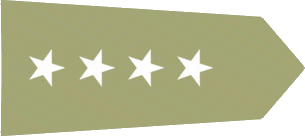
- Kapitan (Captain) - 1980
- Major (Major) - 1985
- Podpułkownik (Lieutenant colonel) - 1989
- Pułkownik (Colonel) - 1993
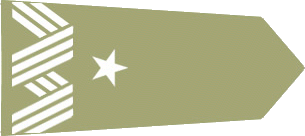
- Generał brygady (Brigadier general) - 1997
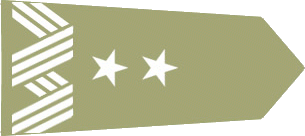
- Generał dywizji (Major general) - 2003
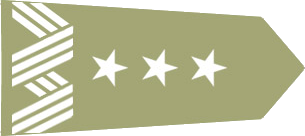
- Generał broni (Lieutenant general) - 2006
- Generał (General) - 2006

== Medals and decorations ==
- Grand Cross of the Order of Polonia Restituta (2010, posthumously)
- Officer's Cross Order of Polonia Restituta (2005)
- Knight's Cross Order of Polonia Restituta (1998)
- Golden Cross of Merit
- Golden Medal for Long Service
- Golden Medal of the Armed Forces in the Service of the Fatherland
- Silver Medal of the Armed Forces in the Service of the Fatherland
- Bronze Medal of the Armed Forces in the Service of the Fatherland
- Golden Medal of Merit for National Defence
- Silver Medal of Merit for National Defence
- Bronze Medal of Merit for National Defence
- Pro Memoria Medal
- Medal of the 100th Anniversary of the Establishment of the General Staff (2018, posthumously)
- Medal of Merit for the Association of Veterans of UN Peace Missions
- Commander of the Legion of Honour (France, 17 December 2008, France)
- Commander of the Legion of Merit (USA, 22 May 2008)
- Grand Cross of the Order of Merit (Portugal, 1 September 2008)
- Honorary Badge of Premysl Otakar II (Czech Republic, 1 March 2007)
- Meritorious Service Cross (Canada, 13 April 2011, posthumously)
- Medal of the UN mission in UNEF II
- UN Medal UNDOF mission
- Medal of UNIKOM mission

Military offices
Preceded by Mieczysław Cieniuch	Chief of the General Staff of the Polish Armed Forces; 2006–2010	Succeeded by Mieczysław Stachowiak
