= Czesław Piątas =

Polish general

General Czesław Piątas
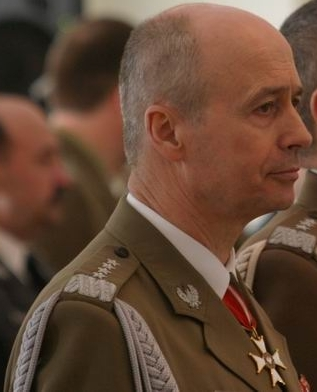
- General Czesław Piątas
- Born: 20 March 1946 (age 80); Hausach, Germany
- Service years: 1965 - 2006
- Rank: Generał (General)
- Units: Chief of Staff of the Polish Army
- Awards: Commanders' Cross of Polonia Restituta Golden Cross of Merit

Gen. Czesław Piątas (born 20 March 1946) is a Polish general, former Chief of General Staff of the Polish Army. He is one of the authors of the plan of modernisation of the Polish armed forces and one of the architects of its integration with the structures of NATO.

== Biography ==
Czesław Piątas was born in Hausach, Germany. In September 1965 he joined the Polish Army and the Armour Officer's School in Poznań. After he graduated in 1968, he was promoted to the rank of ensign (podporucznik) and assigned to the 8th Tank Regiment of Żagań-based Polish 11th Armoured Division as a tank platoon commander. In 1971 he was promoted to first lieutenant (porucznik) and the following year he assumed command over a company of tanks in the same regiment.

For the good effects of his work on the post of a tank commander, in 1974 Piątas was sent to Moscow, where he joined the Kliment Voroshilov Academy of Tank Troops. One of the best students at his course, in 1975 he was promoted to captain. In 1977 he graduated and was instantly assigned to the staff of the 11th Armoured Division, where he accomplished his probation.

In 1978 he became the chief of staff and deputy commanding officer of the 3rd Tank Regiment of the 11th Division. The following year Piątas was promoted to major. In 1980 he joined the 10th Tank Regiment of the Polish 10th Armoured Division, of which he also was the chief of staff. The unit under his command won many military awards, including the title of a leading unit of the Silesian Military District, which won Piątas a promotion to the rank of lieutenant-colonel in 1982. The following year he became the chief of staff and deputy commanding officer of the Opole-based 10th Armoured Division. He served on that post until 1986, when he was promoted to colonel and yet again sent to Moscow for training.

There he joined the General Staff Academy of the USSR. He graduated in 1982 and was assigned to the Headquarters of the Silesian Military Area, and in 1986 was given the command of Polish 4th Mechanised Division. Upon his return in 1988, Piątas settled in Wrocław, where he became the Chief of Operations and the deputy commander of the Silesian Military District. In 1991 he left that post and became the commander of the Polish 4th Armoured Division dislocated in Krosno Odrzańskie. He distinguished himself as a brilliant organizer and in 1992 his division received the title of The Leading Unit of the Polish Army - the highest peacetime award a tactical unit can achieve. The same year he was promoted by president Lech Wałęsa to the rank of brigadier general (generał brygady) and in 1993 he returned to the headquarters of the Silesian Military District, where he resumed his previous post of Chief of Operations and deputy commander.

In 1996 he was moved to Warsaw, where he assumed the post of chief of staff of the Warsaw Military District. In January 1997 he was assigned to the General Staff of the Polish Army as the Chief of Operational and Strategic Command. As such he was one of the Polish officers who took part in the Polish-NATO accession talks in 1997-1998. After that he travelled to United States. There he settled in Washington, D.C. and joined the National War College. He graduated in 1999 and returned to Warsaw, where he became the deputy Chief of General Staff of the Polish Army.

On 15 August 1999 he was promoted by president Aleksander Kwaśniewski to major general (generał dywizji). On 28 September 2000 Piątas became the Chief of General Staff and was promoted to lieutenant general (generał broni). On 15 August 2002 Piątas was promoted to the rank of general (generał). On 25 September 2003 he was reappointed to another three-year term as Chief of General Staff. He retired from active service in January 2006.

In January 2008 he became Deputy Minister of Defense in Donald Tusk's government.

General Czesław Piątas is married to Danuta. They have two children. He is interested in military history and tennis; and speaks Polish, Russian and English fluently.

== Promotions ==
- Podporucznik (Second lieutenant) - 1968
- Porucznik (First lieutenant) - 1971
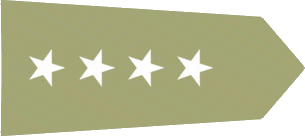
- Kapitan (Captain) - 1975
- Major (Major) - 1979
- Podpułkownik (Lieutenant colonel) - 1982
- Pułkownik (Colonel) - 1986
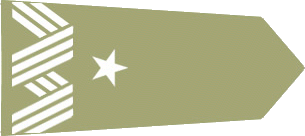
- Generał brygady (Brigadier general) - 1992
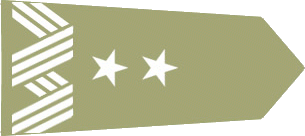
- Generał dywizji (Major general) - 15 August 1999
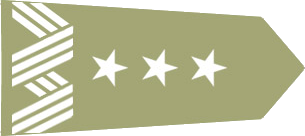
- Generał broni (Lieutenant general) - 18 September 2000
- Generał (General) - 15 August 2002

== Awards and decorations ==
- Commander's Cross of Order of Polonia Restituta (2001)
- Officer's Cross of Order of Polonia Restituta
- Knight's Cross of Order of Polonia Restituta
- Golden Cross of Merit
- Silver Cross of Merit
- Golden Medal of the Armed Forces in the Service of the Fatherland
- Silver Medal of the Armed Forces in the Service of the Fatherland
- Bronze Medal of the Armed Forces in the Service of the Fatherland
- Golden Medal of Merit for National Defence
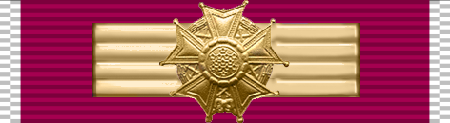
- Chief Commander of Legion of Merit (United States)
- Commander of Legion of Honour (France)

== See also ==
- Polish Army
- NATO
