= Koniuszowa =

- Village
- Location within Poland
- Coordinates: 49°39′20″N 20°47′31″E
- Country: Poland
- Voivodeship: Lesser Poland
- County: Nowy Sącz
- Gmina: Korzenna

Koniuszowa [kɔɲuˈʂɔva] is a village in the administrative district of Gmina Korzenna, within Nowy Sącz County, Lesser Poland Voivodeship, in southern Poland.

In the June 2021 European tornado outbreak, the village was struck by a tornado rated F2 on the Fujita scale.

== Notable people ==
- Franciszek Gągor, Polish general
