= Zdzisław Stelmaszuk =

Polish general

- Born: 23 May 1936 (age 90); Przegaliny Duże, Second Polish Republic
- Education: Higher Military Engineering Officers' School; Military University of Technology
- Military career
- Rank: Divisional general
- Commands: Chief of the General Staff of the Polish Armed Forces

Zdzisław Stelmaszuk (born 23 May 1936 in Przegaliny Duże) is a Polish military commander, Major General of the Polish Armed Forces, engineer, Doctor of Military Sciences, Head of the Military Engineering Corps of the Ministry of National Defense, Chief of the General Staff of the Polish Armed Forces (1990–1992).

== Biography ==
He began his military service in 1954 as a cadet at the Higher Military Engineering Officers' School in Wrocław. He was promoted to second lieutenant in 1957. After promotion, he became commander of a sapper platoon in the 9th Regiment of the Internal Security Corps. From 1959 to 1960, he served as platoon commander in the Higher Military Engineering Officers' School. From 1960 to 1962, he commanded a sapper company in the 9th Regiment of the Internal Security Corps.

After graduating from the Military University of Technology in 1966, he completed his studies at the Military University of Technology with the rank of captain, he was assistant commander of the bridge construction battalion in the 5th Engineer Brigade in Szczecin, and then commander of the engineer battalion in the 5th Engineer Brigade until 1968. For four years, he was commander of the divisional engineer battalion of the 7th Airborne Division. From 1972 to 1974, he was commander of the 9th Pontoon Regiment in Chełmno. The regiment earned the title of leading unit in the engineering forces.

After graduating from the Voroshilov Academy of the General Staff of the Soviet Armed Forces in Moscow in 1976, he became commander of the 5th Engineer Brigade. From 1978, he was head of the Engineering Troops of the Warsaw Military District, and later deputy and head of the Engineering Troops of the Ministry of National Defense.

In 1987, he became deputy chief of the General Staff for Operations. From September 1989 to September 1990, he was commander of the Warsaw Military District. From April 1990 to 1992, he served as Chief of the General Staff of the Polish Armed Forces. He initiated the first contacts with NATO and reorganized the General Staff of the Polish Armed Forces.

For the next year, he remained at the disposal of the Minister of National Defense. From 1993 to 1994, he served as an advisor to the Advisory Team of the Minister of National Defense. He retired from professional military service on 7 October 1994. He lives in Warsaw.
