= Polish General Staff =

Highest professional body within the Polish Armed Forces

Chief of the General Staff
- Szef Sztabu Generalnego Wojska Polskiego
- Emblem of the PGS

- Flag of the PGS Chief

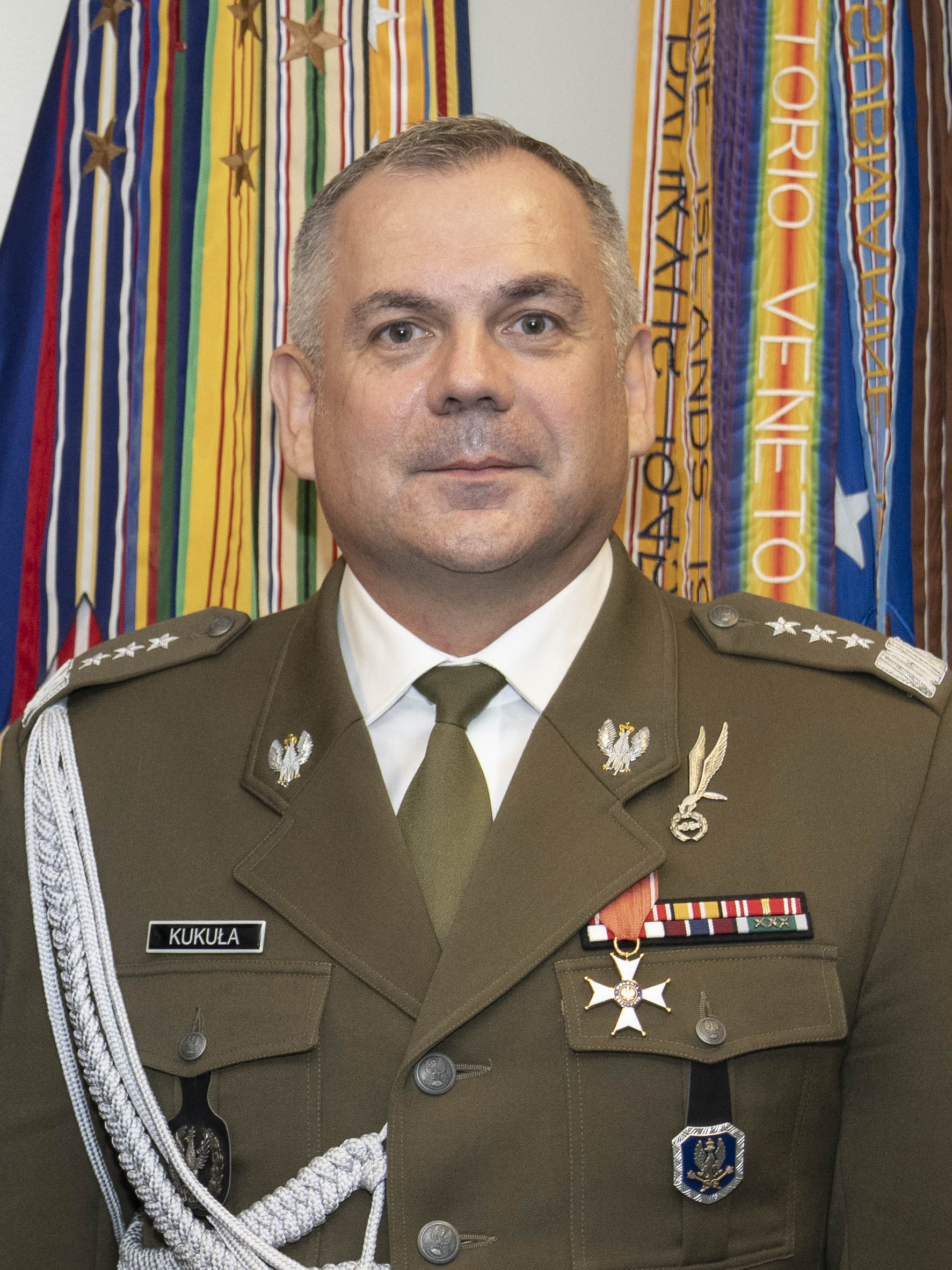
- Incumbent; General Wiesław Kukuła since 10 October 2023
- Polish Armed Forces
- Member of: General Staff of the Polish Armed Forces
- Reports to: Minister of National Defence
- Appointer: President of Poland
- Formation: 28 October 1918; 108 years ago
- First holder: Tadeusz Jordan-Rozwadowski
- Website: www.wojsko-polskie.pl/sgwp

Polish General Staff, formally known as the General Staff of the Polish Armed Forces (Polish: Sztab Generalny Wojska Polskiego) is the highest professional body within the Polish Armed Forces. Organizationally, it is an integral part of the Ministry of National Defence and the Chief of the General Staff is the highest ranking military officer at the Ministry. It was created in 1918, and was renamed the Main Staff (Sztab Główny) in 1928 before being reverted back to General Staff (Sztab Generalny) in 1945 by the Soviet-backed Communist government. Currently General Wiesław Kukuła holds the position of Chief of the General Staff of the Polish Armed Forces (Szef Sztabu Generalnego Wojska Polskiego).

== History and structure ==
On 25 October 1918, a decision was made to establish the directorate of the chief of staff of the Polish Army. On 22 December 1928 the General Staff was renamed to the Main Staff (Sztab Główny). In September 1939, during the Invasion of Poland by the Wehrmacht and the Red Army, all the institutions of the Main Staff ceased to function and were transferred to joint German and Soviet control. On 8 August 1944, the Main Staff of the Polish Army was created by the Polish Committee of National Liberation and on 10 July 1945, the Provisional Government of National Unity reverted its name back to the General Staff of the Polish Army, the head of which was appointed Soviet-Polish General Vladislav Korchits. The Polish government-in-exile kept the previous name until the positions dissolution.

The General Staff consists of the following command personnel and organizational units at the Ministry of National Defence (MON):

Command personnel (Kadra kierownicza):

- Chief of the General Staff (Szef Sztabu Generalnego WP) - Generał Wiesław Kukuła
- First Deputy Chief of the General Staff (I Zastępca szefa Sztabu Generalnego WP) - Generał broni Karol Dymanowski
- Deputy Chief of Staff (Zastępca szefa Sztabu Generalnego WP) - Generał broni Stanisław Czosnek
- Deputy Chief of Staff (Zastępca szefa Sztabu Generalnego WP) - Generał dywizji Krzysztof Zielski
- Director of the Chief of the GS's Secretariat (Szef Sekretariatu Szefa SG WP) - Col. Arkadiusz Rubajczyk
- Director of the Legal Department (Szef Zespołu Prasowego - rzecznik prasowy SG WP) - Col. Marek Pietrzak
- Director of the Coordination Center (Szef Centrum Koordynacyjnego) - Col. Piotr Pacek
- Chief NCO (Starszy podoficer SG WP) - Starszy chorąży sztabowy Mirosław Ziarniak

General Staff Directorates (Zarządy Sztabu Generalnego WP):

- Organization and Manpower Complement Directorate (Zarząd Organizacji i Zasobów Osobowych - P1) - Colonel Bogdan Sowa
- Intelligence and Reconnaissance Analysis Directorate (Zarząd Analiz Wywiadowczych i Rozpoznawczych - P2) - Generał brygady Mieczysław Bieniek
- Armed Forces Application Planning and Training Directorate (Zarząd Planowania Operacyjnego - P3) - Generał dywizji Krzysztof Knut
- Logistics Directorate (Zarząd Logistyki - P4) - Colonel Sławomir Walenczykowski
- Armed Forces Development Planning and Programming Directorate (Zarząd Planowania i Programowania Rozwoju Sił Zbrojnych - P5) - Generał brygady Grzegorz Potrzuski
- Management and Command Directorate (Zarząd Kierowania i Dowodzenia - P6) - Generał brygady Piotr Chodowiec
- Training Directorate (Zarząd Szkolenia - P7) - Generał brygady Rafał Miernik
- Material Planning Directorate (Zarząd Planowania Rzeczowego - P8) - Generał brygady Jarosław Rybak

== List of chiefs of the general staff ==
=== Kingdom of Poland (1917–1918) ===
Head of the Inspectorate

| No. | Portrait | Head of the Inspectorate | Took office | Left office | Time in office |
|---|---|---|---|---|---|
| 1 | Felix von Barth [pl] | gen. piech. Felix von Barth (1851–1931) | 23 April 1917 | 19 October 1918 | 18 days |
| 2 | Henryk Minkiewicz | płk Henryk Minkiewicz (1880–1940) | 19 October 1918 | 28 October 1918 | 9 days |

Chief of Staff

| No. | Portrait | Chief of Staff | Took office | Left office | Time in office |
|---|---|---|---|---|---|
| 1 | Tadeusz Rozwadowski | gen. dyw. Tadeusz Rozwadowski (1866–1928) | 28 October 1918 | 14 November 1918 | 17 days |

=== Second Polish Republic (1918−1939) ===
Chief of the General Staff

| No. | Portrait | Chief of the General Staff | Took office | Left office | Time in office |
|---|---|---|---|---|---|
| 1 | Tadeusz Rozwadowski | gen. dyw. Tadeusz Rozwadowski (1866–1928) | 14 November 1918 | 15 November 1918 | 1 day |
| 2 | Stanisław Szeptycki | gen. broni Stanisław Szeptycki (1867–1950) | 16 November 1918 | 7 February 1919 | 84 days |
| 3 | Stanisław Haller | gen. dyw. Stanisław Haller (1872–1940) | 8 February 1919 | 22 July 1920 | 1 year, 165 days |
| (1) | Tadeusz Rozwadowski | gen. dyw. Tadeusz Rozwadowski (1866–1928) | 22 July 1920 | 1 April 1921 | 253 days |
| 4 | Władysław Sikorski | gen. dyw. Władysław Sikorski (1881–1943) | 1 April 1921 | 6 December 1922 | 1 year, 249 days |
| 5 | Józef Piłsudski | Marszałek Polski; Józef Piłsudski (1867–1935) | 17 December 1922 | 9 June 1923 | 174 days |
| (3) | Stanisław Haller | gen. dyw. Stanisław Haller (1872–1940) | 9 June 1923 | 16 December 1925 | 2 years, 190 days |
| 6 | Edmund Kessler | gen. bryg. Edmund Kessler (1880–1930) | 16 December 1925 | 12 May 1926 | 147 days |
| (3) | Stanisław Haller | gen. dyw. Stanisław Haller (1872–1940) | 12 May 1926 | 15 May 1926 | 3 days |
| 7 | Stanisław Burhardt-Bukacki | gen. bryg. Stanisław Burhardt-Bukacki (1890–1942) | 17 May 1926 | 28 June 1926 | 42 days |
| 8 | Tadeusz Piskor | gen. bryg. (Note: Promoted to generał dywizji on 1 January 1928.); Tadeusz Piskor (1889–1951) | 28 June 1926 | 22 December 1928 | 2 years, 177 days |

Chief of the Main Staff

| No. | Portrait | Chief of the Main Staff | Took office | Left office | Time in office |
|---|---|---|---|---|---|
| 1 | Tadeusz Piskor | gen. dyw. Tadeusz Piskor (1889–1951) | 22 December 1928 | 5 December 1931 | 2 years, 348 days |
| 2 | Janusz Gąsiorowski | gen. bryg. Janusz Gąsiorowski (1889–1949) | 3 December 1931 | 7 June 1935 | 3 years, 186 days |
| 3 | Wacław Stachiewicz | gen. bryg. Wacław Stachiewicz (1894–1973) | 7 June 1935 | 18 September 1939 | 4 years, 103 days |

=== Polish government-in-exile (1939−1946) ===
| No. | Portrait | Chief of the Main Staff | Took office | Left office | Time in office |
|---|---|---|---|---|---|
| 1 | Aleksander Kędzior [pl] | płk Aleksander Kędzior (1897–1986) | 7 November 1939 | 5 June 1940 | 211 days |
| 2 | Tadeusz Klimecki | gen. bryg. Tadeusz Klimecki (1895–1943) | 5 June 1940 | 4 July 1943 † | 3 years, 29 days |
| 3 | Stanisław Kopański | gen. dyw. Stanisław Kopański (1895–1976) | 21 July 1943 | 3 September 1946 | 3 years, 44 days |

=== Republic of Poland / Polish People's Republic (1945−1989) ===
| No. | Portrait | Chief of the General Staff | Took office | Left office | Time in office |
|---|---|---|---|---|---|
| 1 | Władysław Korczyc | gen. broni Władysław Korczyc (1893–1966) | 9 May 1945 | 18 January 1954 | 8 years, 254 days |
| – | Borys Pigarewicz [pl] | gen. broni Borys Pigarewicz (1898–1961); Acting | 18 January 1954 | 23 March 1954 | 64 days |
| 2 | Jerzy Bordziłowski | gen. broni Jerzy Bordziłowski (1900–1983) | 23 March 1954 | 6 February 1965 | 10 years, 320 days |
| 3 | Wojciech Jaruzelski | gen. dyw. Wojciech Jaruzelski (1923–2014) | 6 February 1965 | 10 April 1968 | 3 years, 64 days |
| 4 | Bolesław Chocha | gen. dyw. Bolesław Chocha (1923–1987) | 10 April 1968 | 11 January 1973 | 4 years, 276 days |
| 5 | Florian Siwicki | gen. broni Florian Siwicki (1925–2013) | 12 January 1973 | 21 November 1983 | 10 years, 313 days |
| 6 | Józef Użycki | gen. broni Józef Użycki (1932–2022) | 22 November 1983 | 1 January 1990 | 6 years, 40 days |

=== Third Polish Republic (1990−present) ===
| No. | Portrait | Chief of the General Staff | Took office | Left office | Time in office |
|---|---|---|---|---|---|
| 1 | Józef Użycki | gen. broni Józef Użycki (1932–2022) | 1 January 1990 | 24 September 1990 | 266 days |
| 2 | Zdzisław Stelmaszuk | gen. broni Zdzisław Stelmaszuk (born 1936) | 25 September 1990 | 4 August 1992 | 1 year, 314 days |
| 3 | Tadeusz Wilecki | gen. broni Tadeusz Wilecki (born 1945) | 4 August 1992 | 9 March 1997 | 4 years, 216 days |
| 4 | Henryk Szumski | gen. broni Henryk Szumski (1941–2012) | 10 March 1997 | 29 September 2000 | 3 years, 203 days |
| 5 | Czesław Piątas | gen. Czesław Piątas (born 1946) | 30 September 2000 | 31 January 2006 | 5 years, 123 days |
| – | Mieczysław Cieniuch | gen. broni Mieczysław Cieniuch (born 1951); Acting | 31 January 2006 | 27 February 2006 | 27 days |
| 6 | Franciszek Gągor | gen. Franciszek Gągor (1951–2010) | 27 February 2006 | 10 April 2010 † | 4 years, 42 days |
| – | Mieczysław Stachowiak [pl] | gen. broni Mieczysław Stachowiak (born 1952); Acting | 10 April 2010 | 7 May 2010 | 27 days |
| 7 | Mieczysław Cieniuch | gen. Mieczysław Cieniuch (born 1951) | 7 May 2010 | 6 May 2013 | 2 years, 364 days |
| 8 | Mieczysław Gocuł | gen. Mieczysław Gocuł (born 1963) | 7 May 2013 | 31 January 2017 | 3 years, 269 days |
| 9 | Leszek Surawski | gen. Leszek Surawski (born 1960) | 31 January 2017 | 2 July 2018 | 1 year, 152 days |
| 10 | Rajmund Andrzejczak | gen. Rajmund Andrzejczak (born 1967) | 2 July 2018 | 10 October 2023 | 5 years, 100 days |
| 11 | Wiesław Kukuła | gen. Wiesław Kukuła (born 1972) | 10 October 2023 | Incumbent | 3 years, 19 days |

== See also ==
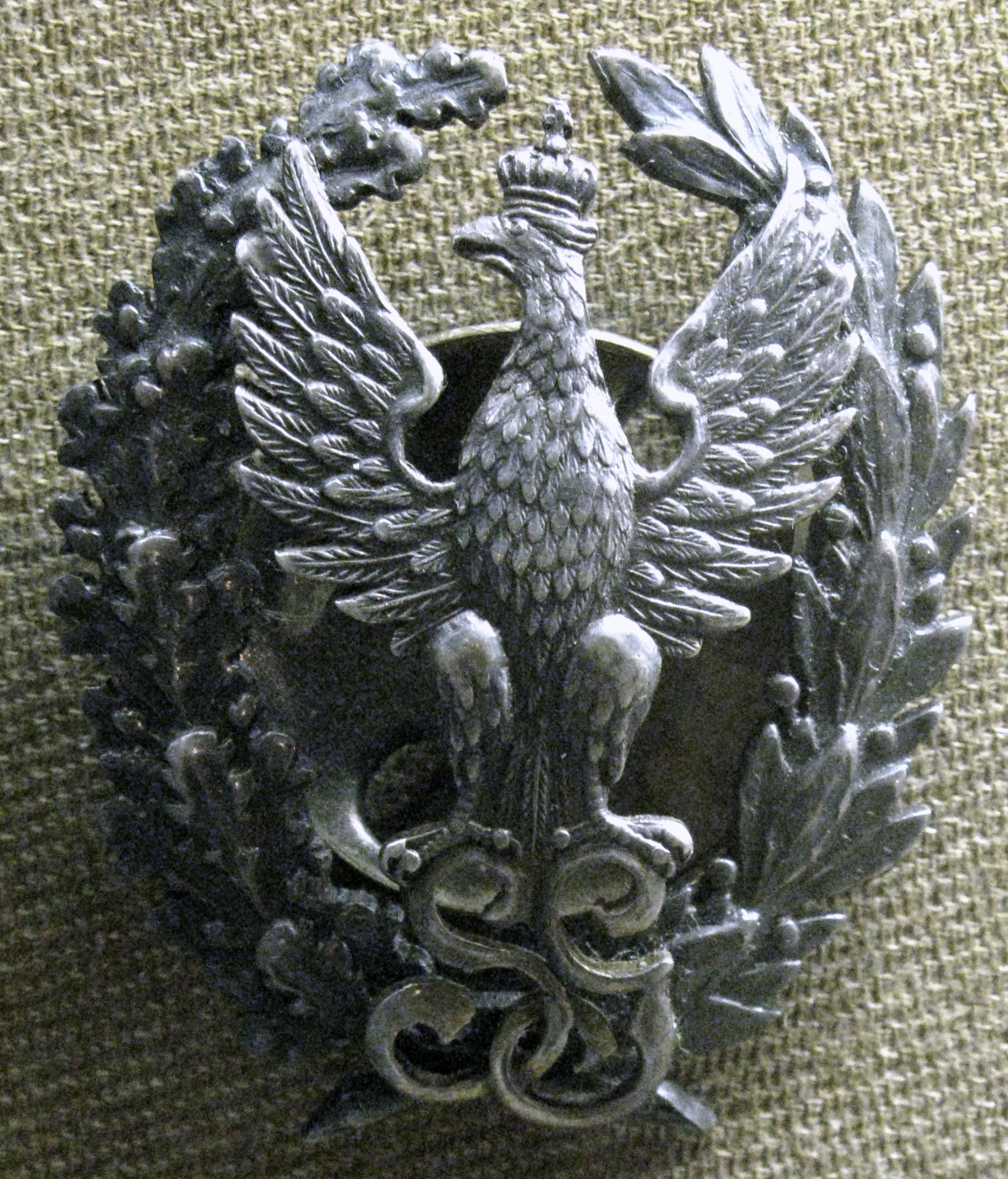
Badge of a WSWoj–certified officer of the General Staff of the Second Polish Republic (1918–1939).

- Staff (military)
- General Inspector of the Armed Forces
