= Medal of Victory and Freedom 1945 =

Polish military decoration

Medal of Victory and Freedom 1945 (Polish: Medal Zwycięstwa i Wolności 1945) was a Polish military decoration awarded to persons who fought during World War II against Nazi Germany.

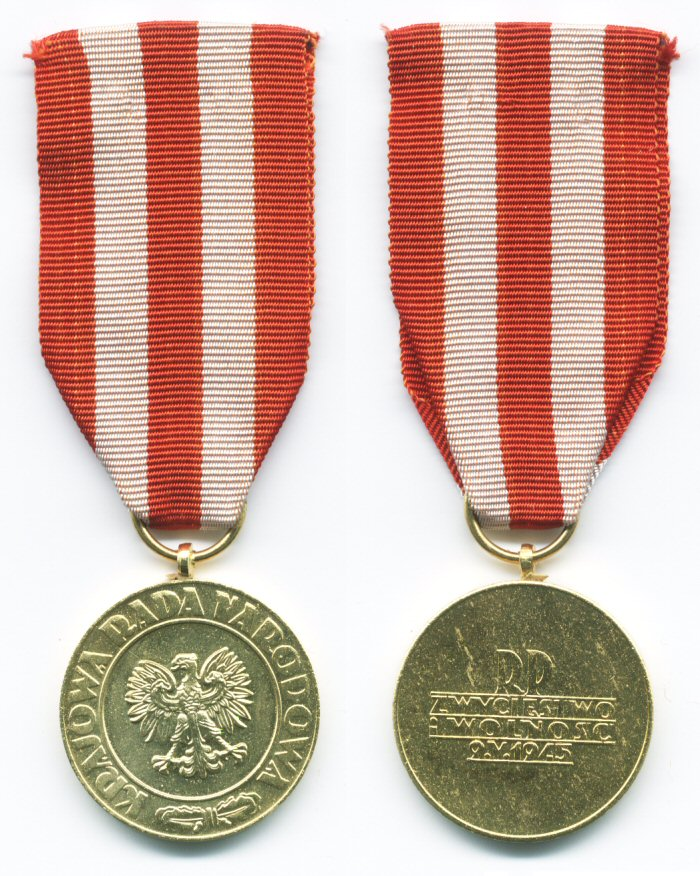
Medal of Victory and Freedom 1945 - obverse and reverse

== Overview ==
The medal was introduced by a decree of the Council of Ministers and approved by the State National Council (Krajowa Rada Narodowa) on October 26, 1945. According to the decree, it was instituted to commemorate the victory of the Polish Nation and its allies over the barbarism of hitlerism, a triumph of the idea of democratic freedom, and to award persons who helped in this victory and triumph by their actions or suffering, in this country or abroad, by May 9, 1945.

== Recipients ==
It was awarded to:

- soldiers of the Polish People's Army (Ludowe Wojsko Polskie) in the USSR
- soldiers fighting in the invasion of Poland in 1939
- soldiers of the Polish Armed Forces in the West, provided that they come back to Poland after the war
- Poles who fought against Germans in allied armies
- Polish partisans fighting in the country or abroad
- members of the Soviet, Yugoslav or French partisan units.
- armed forces members who served at least three months by May 9, 1945, in auxiliary units, helping in the victory.

Ribbon

== Currency ==
The medal was awarded by the Prime Minister, and from 1958 by the Council of State. It ceased to be awarded in 1992. About 670,000 Medals were awarded by 1985.

It was first awarded on May 9, 1946, given among others to Bolesław Bierut.

== Description ==
The Medal was 33 mm in diameter. Its obverse shows the eagle, the coat of arms of Poland, in the center surrounded by the inscription: "KRAJOWA RADA NARODOWA". The reverse bears the horizontal inscription in four lines: "R.P. / ZWYCIĘSTWO / I WOLNOŚĆ / 9.V.1945" ("Polish Republic / Victory / And Freedom / 9 May 1945"). Attached is a ribbon, 35 mm wide, with three red stripes and two white stripes, each 7 mm wide. From 1960 the ribbon was 33 mm wide. In order of precedence, the Medal of Victory and Freedom 1945 was worn after the Medal for Oder, Neisse and Baltic (Medal za Odrę, Nysę, Bałtyk).
