= Medal for Participation in the Battle of Berlin =

Polish award

Medal for Participation in the Battle of Berlin Medal „Za udział w walkach o Berlin”
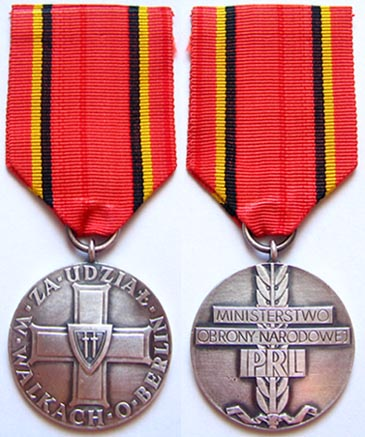
- Type: Commemorative Medal
- Awarded for: Participation in the Battle of Berlin
- Presented by: Poland
- Eligibility: Polish military personnel
- Status: No longer awarded
- Established: April 21, 1966
- Final award: December 23, 1992
- Ribbon bar of the Medal for Participation in the Battle of Berlin

The Medal for Participation in the Battle of Berlin (Polish: Medal „Za udział w walkach o Berlin”) was a Polish commemorative medal awarded by the Polish People's Republic to commemorate Polish military personnel who took part in the Battle of Berlin.

== History ==
The Medal for Participation in the Battle of Berlin was established by the Sejm by the Act of April 21, 1966, to commemorate the victory over Nazi Germany and the contribution of the Polish People's Army in the capture of Berlin in 1945. According to the law, the medal was a recognition of people who took part in the 1945 Berlin Offensive. The ordinance of the Minister of National Defense of April 25, 1966 defined the rules and procedure for awarding the medal, the pattern of the badge and the manner of wearing.

Pursuant to the regulation, the medal was awarded to persons who performed military service in the period from April 1945 to May 9, 1945 in the following units of the Polish Army:

- 1st Tadeusz Kościuszko Infantry Division
- 2nd Pomeranian Haubic Artillery Brigade
- 1st Independent Mortar Brigade
- 6th Warsaw Independent Motorized Pontoon-Bridge Battalion
- Polish Independent Special Battalion

The medal could also be awarded to personnel who performed military service in the above-mentioned period at the headquarters and staffs in during the battle, as well as in the headquarters and units of the Polish Armed Forces in the East cooperating in the capture of Berlin. The medal could be awarded posthumously. The medal was awarded on the basis of documents confirming the fulfillment of the required conditions, and the application for the medal was presented by a special commission appointed by the Minister of National Defense. Together with the badge of the distinction, an award card was presented. If the medal was awarded posthumously, the medal badge and the award card were handed over to the closest family member.

The medal was actually presented during the 1966 Victory Day celebrations on May 9, and was given to professional soldiers by commanders of military units or higher superiors. It was also presented to reserve and retired soldiers by the heads of provincial military staffs or their deputies, or by other persons authorized by the Minister of National Defense.

The historical significance of the participation of the Poles in the capture of Berlin lies in the fact that it was the Polish soldiers who were the first to put up armed resistance during World War II and the only ones from the entire anti-Hitler coalition who fought alongside Red Army soldiers during the 1945 Berlin Offensive. Only the soldiers of the Polish People's Army had the honor of hoisting the Polish flag on the Brandenburg Gate, following the defeat of Nazi Germany in the battle. In total, 12,700 Polish soldiers and officers took part in the direct assault on Berlin.

On December 23, 1992, by the Act of October 16, 1992, the awarding of the Medal for Participation in the Battle of Berlin was deemed completed, as well as most of the war orders and decorations for merits.

== Appearance ==
The designer of the medal was Wacław Kowalik.

The obverse side of the 38mm, silver medal bears the image of the Order of the Cross of Grunwald and carries the inscription ZA UDZIAŁ : W WALKACH O BERLIN ('For participation in the Battle of Berlin'). The reverse is decorated with a laurel spray wearing a ribbon and the inscription MINISTERSTWO / OBRONY NARODOWEJ / PRL ('Ministry of National Defense People's Republic of Poland').

The red ribbon measures 40mm wide and bears two stripes on each side, a yellow one on the outer and a black one on each inner side.

== See also ==
- Medal "For the Capture of Berlin"
