= Medal of the 10th Anniversary of People's Poland =

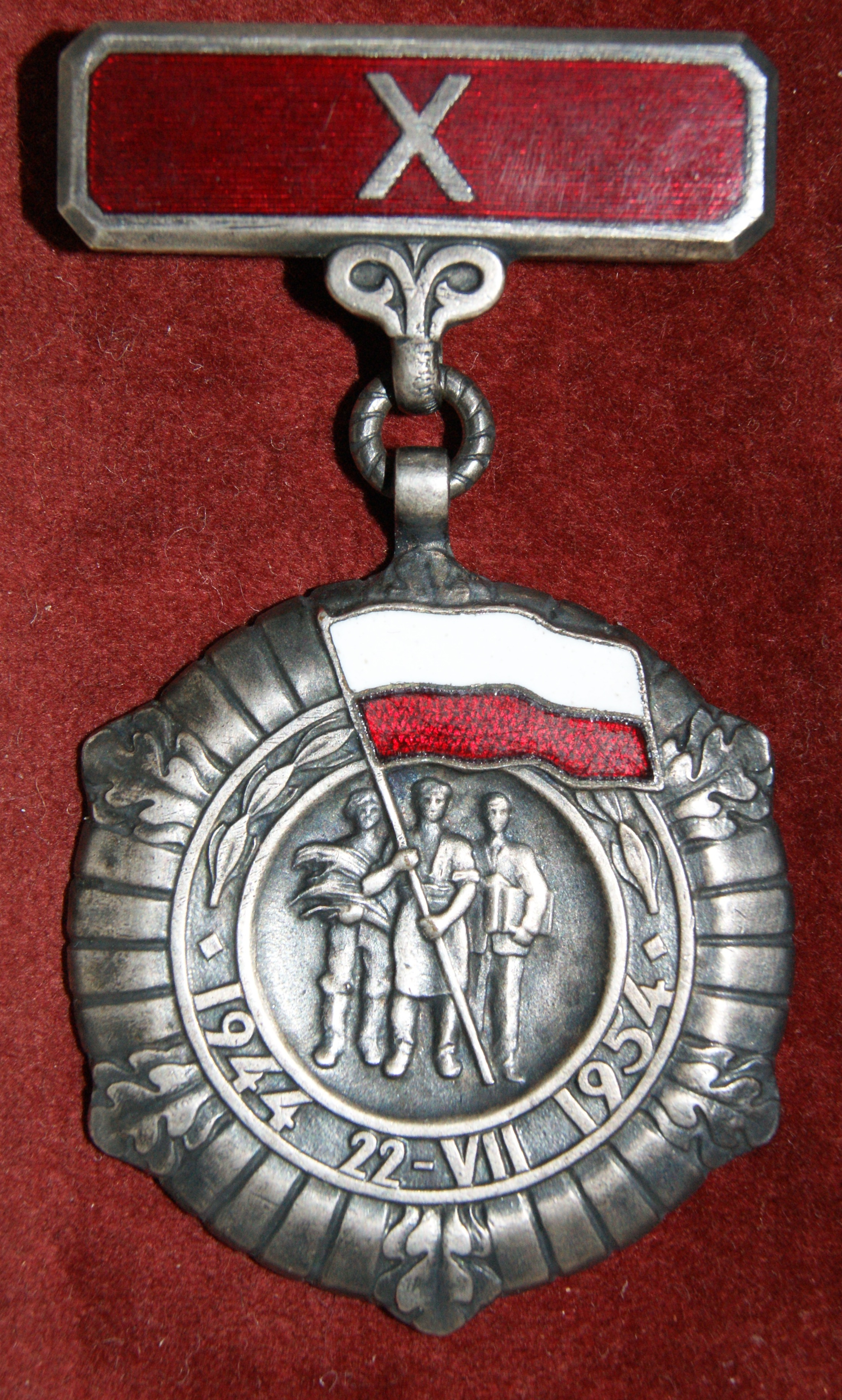
- Type: Medal
- Description: Ø 40 mm
- Country: Poland
- Presented by: Polish Council of State
- Eligibility: Civilian award
- Status: No longer awarded
- Established: May 12, 1954
- First award: July 22, 1954
- Final award: July 22, 1955
- ribbon bar
- Related: Medal of the 30th Anniversary of People's Poland; Medal of the 40th Anniversary of People's Poland

The Medal of the 10th Anniversary of People's Poland (Polish: Medal 10-lecia Polski Ludowej) is a former Polish civil state award established by the Council of State on 23 May 1954 to recognize services to the state.

The medal was created to mark the tenth anniversary of the post-World War II establishment of communist Poland, identified with the PKWN Manifesto of 22 July 1944. It was designed by Polish sculptor Józef Gosławski.

The medal was awarded between 22 July 1954 and 22 July 1955. It was disestablished in 1992. Recipients included Janina Dziarnowska.

Similar medals were later established to mark the 30th anniversary (in 1974) and 40th anniversary (in 1984) of "People's Poland".
