= Medal of the 30th Anniversary of People's Poland =

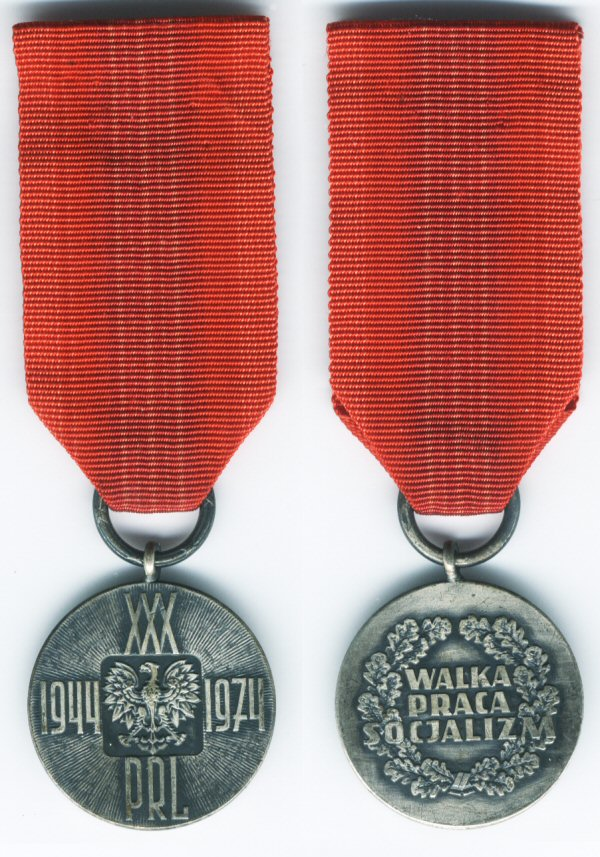
- Type: Medal
- Description: Ø 32 mm
- Country: Poland
- Presented by: Polish Council of State
- Eligibility: Civilian award
- Status: No longer awarded
- Established: February 7, 1974
- First award: July 22, 1974

Highlights
- Total: 229 049
- ribbon bar
- Related: Medal of the 10th Anniversary of People's Poland; Medal of the 40th Anniversary of People's Poland

The Medal of the 30th Anniversary of People's Poland (Polish: Medal 30-lecia Polski Ludowej) is a former civil decoration of Poland established by the Council of State on 7 February 1974 to recognize contribution of working people in development of the country. It was awarded between 7 February 1974 and 31 December 1974. It was disestablished in 1992.

Similar medals were established to mark the 10th anniversary (in 1954) and 40th anniversary (in 1984) of the People's Republic of Poland.
