= Medal of the 40th Anniversary of People's Poland =

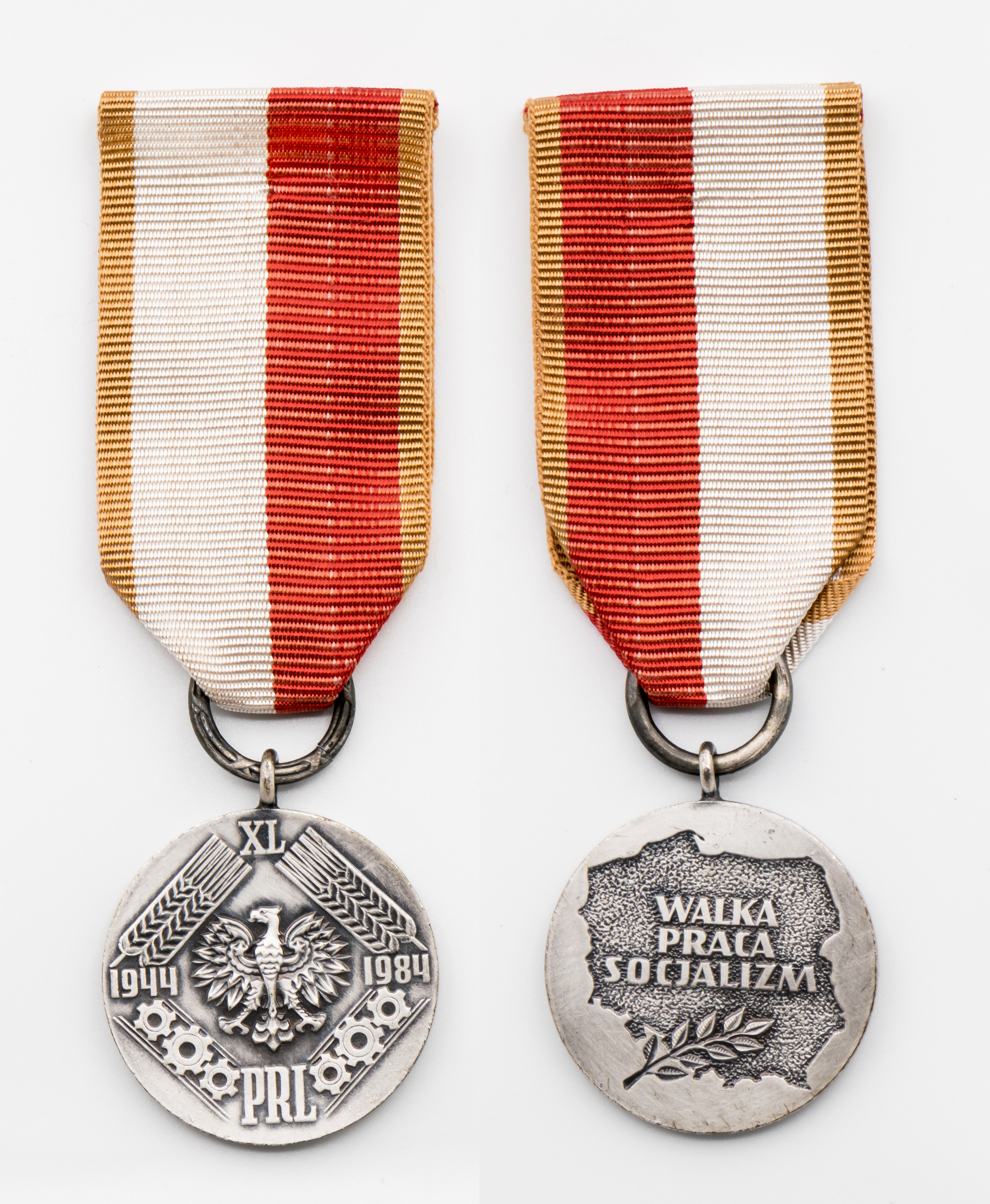
- Type: Medal
- Description: Ø 32 mm
- Country: Poland
- Presented by: Polish Council of State
- Eligibility: Civilian award
- Status: No longer awarded
- Established: April 26, 1984
- First award: 22 July 1984
- Final award: 22 July 1985

Highlights
- Total: 1 217 940
- ribbon bar
- Related: Medal of the 10th Anniversary of People's Poland; Medal of the 30th Anniversary of People's Poland

The Medal of the 40th Anniversary of People's Poland (Polish: Medal 40-lecia Polski Ludowej) is a former civil decoration of Poland established by the Sejm on 26 April 1984 to recognize the contribution of working people in the development of the socialist state. It was awarded between 22 July 1984 and 22 July 1985. It was disestablished in 1992.

Similar medals were established to mark the 10th anniversary (in 1954) and 30th anniversary (in 1974) of the People's Republic of Poland.
