= Medal for Oder, Neisse and Baltic =

Polish award

Medal for Oder, Neisse and Baltic Medal za Odrę, Nysę, Bałtyk
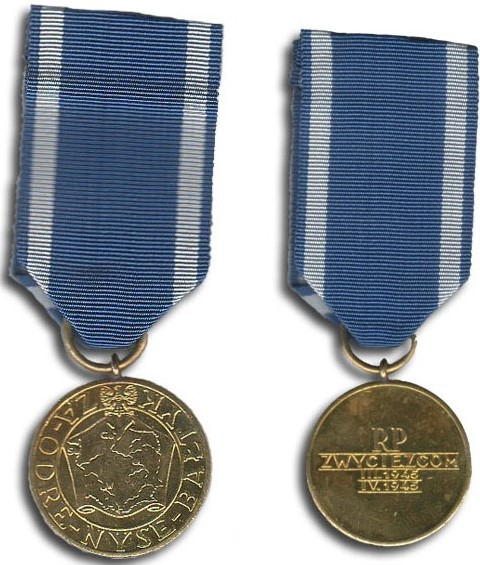
- Type: Commemorative Medal
- Awarded for: Participation in the battles on the Oder, Neisse and the Baltic Sea regions from March to April 1945
- Presented by: Poland
- Eligibility: Polish or foreign civilian and military personnel
- Status: No longer awarded
- Established: October 26, 1945
- Final award: May 8, 1999

Highlights
- Total: 321,975
- Ribbon bar of the Medal for Oder, Neisse and Baltic

The Medal for Oder, Neisse and Baltic (Polish: Medal za Odrę, Nysę, Bałtyk) was a Polish commemorative medal awarded by the Polish People's Republic to commemorate those who directly participated in combat against the Nazi Germany for the liberation of Poland and the restoration of its old boundaries on the rivers the Oder, the Neisse and the coast of Baltic Sea.

== History ==
The Medal for Oder, Neisse and Baltic was established by decree of the Council of Ministers of October 26, 1945:

"To commemorate the great victories of the Polish soldier who fought on new boundaries on the Oder and Nysa and on the coast of the Baltic Sea, regaining the Polish ancient Slavic lands in the west and north and reward participants of these fights."

In the decree, the medal was called Medal for the Oder, Nissa, Bałtyk, with the then Polish name of the river Neisse - 'Nissa'. In the Act of February 17, 1960 on medals and decorations, the medal's name was changed to Medal for the Oder, Neisse, Baltic and it was then specified that it was awarded for people who took part in the battles for the borders on the Oder, Neisse and the Baltic Sea regions.

The medal was awarded by the Minister of National Defense on behalf of the State National Council to soldiers who fought in the decisive period from March to April 1945 in units of the 1st Polish Army, 2nd Polish Army, 1st Armored Corps, and with air force units involved in the fighting on the Oder, the Lusatian Neisse and the Baltic coast from Gdańsk to Szczecin. It could also be awarded to civilians and Red Army personnel who cooperated with the Polish Armed Forces in the East, and whose actions contributed to the victory in the battle. From 1958, the medal was awarded by the State National Council. The Minister of National Defense transferred the right to award the medal to commanders of military districts, infantry divisions and the commander of the 1st Warsaw Cavalry Division.

By the Act of October 16, 1992, the Medal for Oder, Neisse and Baltic was transferred to the category of commemorative (anniversary) insignia and medals with a validity period of up to May 8, 1995, inclusive. Subsequently, this period was extended until May 8, 1999. The regulations on awarding the medal and its description have not changed. Until 1987, 321,975 awards were made. Later, another 479 medals were issued. In total, 322,454 medals were awarded. By May 8, 1999, the awarding of the medal was deemed complete.

== Appearance ==
The bronze medal of the Medal for Oder, Neisse and Baltic measures 33 mm in diameter. The Polish eagle is placed at the top of the medal, holds a roll in its claws with on it an image of the map of Poland, with its main rivers and the cities Warsaw (W), Gdańsk (G), Szczecin (S) and Wrocław (W). The map is framed by narrow border. Around the map is the inscription: "ZA Odrę - Nysę - Bałtyk" (For 'Oder', 'Neisse', 'Baltic').

On the obverse there is the Polish inscription: "RP-ZWYCIEZCOM-III.1945-IV.1945" ('RP', 'To the victors', 'March 1945', 'April 1945') in underlined words. There is a second version of medal, which differs from the first in terms of the fact that on the front side of the medal on the map there are no designations of the main Polish cities.

The ribbon is 35 mm and dark blue with two longitudinal stripes of white-blue along the sides. Width of longitudinal stripes is 4 mm.
