= Order of the Cross of Grunwald =

Order of the Cross of Grunwald Order Krzyża Grunwaldu
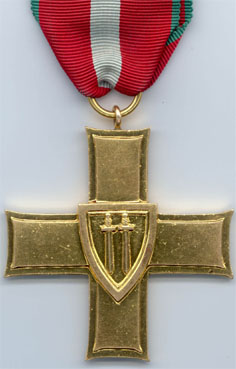
- Cross 1st Class - Obverse
- Type: Three-class military decoration
- Awarded for: Valour or merit in combat with Nazi Germany; Outstanding merit in commanding and development of the Polish Armed Forces
- Presented by: Poland
- Eligibility: Polish or foreign military
- Status: No longer awarded
- Established: November 1943; 20 February 1944 (official date)
- First award: 1943/1944
- 1st Class Ribbon 2nd Class Ribbon 3rd Class Ribbon

The Order of the Cross of Grunwald (Polish: Order Krzyża Grunwaldu) was a military decoration created in Poland in November 1943 by the High Command of Gwardia Ludowa, a World War II Polish resistance movement organised by the Polish Workers Party. On 20 February 1944 it was confirmed by the State National Council and on 22 December by the Polish Committee of National Liberation and further confirmed on 17 February 1960 by the government of the People's Republic of Poland.

The Order of the Cross of Grunwald was conferred to Polish or the allied military for valour or merit in combat with Nazi Germany. After the end of the Second World War it continued to be awarded for merit in commanding or outstanding contribution to the development of the Polish Armed Forces. It was disestablished by the President of Poland via Parliament in 1992.

== See also ==
- Battle of Grunwald
- Grunwald Swords
