= Medal of the Armed Forces in the Service of the Fatherland =

Medal of the Armed Forces in the Service of the Fatherland Medal Siły Zbrojne w Służbie Ojczyzny
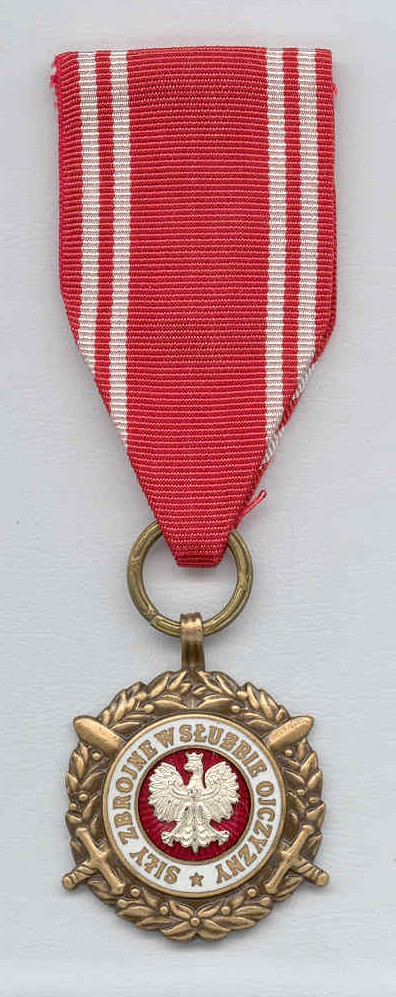
- Medal in bronze
- Type: Three class medal
- Awarded for: Long service in the Polish armed forces
- Country: Poland
- Presented by: Minister of National Defence
- Eligibility: Polish military personnel
- Status: Currently awarded
- Established: 26 May 1951
- Ribbon bar for the gold medal Ribbon bar for the silver medal Ribbon bar for the bronze medal

Precedence
- Next (higher): Meritorious Military Pilot Decoration
- Next (lower): Medal of Merit for National Defence
- Related: Long Service Medal

The Medal of the Armed Forces in the Service of the Fatherland (Polish: Medal Siły Zbrojne w Służbie Ojczyzny) is a Polish military decoration, awarded for long service and excellent work in the army. The medal was first established on 26 May 1951, and the detailed rules and grades were revised in 1991 and 1995. Until 1968, it was a state distinction awarded by the head of state; from 1968 it was a departmental award, granted by the Minister of Defence. It continues to be presented as an award of the Ministry of Defence, as the Long Service Medal is a state-awarded decoration, conferred on an individual basis to selected recipients only.

There are three grades, Gold, Silver and Bronze, awarded for 25, 15 and 5 years, respectively. The ribbon is red with double white edge stripes and a central gold or silver stripe for gold and silver awards.

== Notable recipients ==
- Andrzej Andrzejewski
- Janusz Bojarski
- Mieczysław Cygan
- Jarosław Florczak
- Franciszek Gągor
- Wojciech Jaruzelski
- Andrzej Karweta
- Roman Krzyżelewski
- Bronisław Kwiatkowski
- Krzysztof Ligęza
- Johnny R. Miller
- Stanislav Poplavsky
- Włodzimierz Potasiński
- Józef Urbanowicz
- Tomasz Piotrowski
