= Medal of Merit for National Defence =

Medal of Merit for National Defence Medal Za Zasługi dla Obronności Kraju
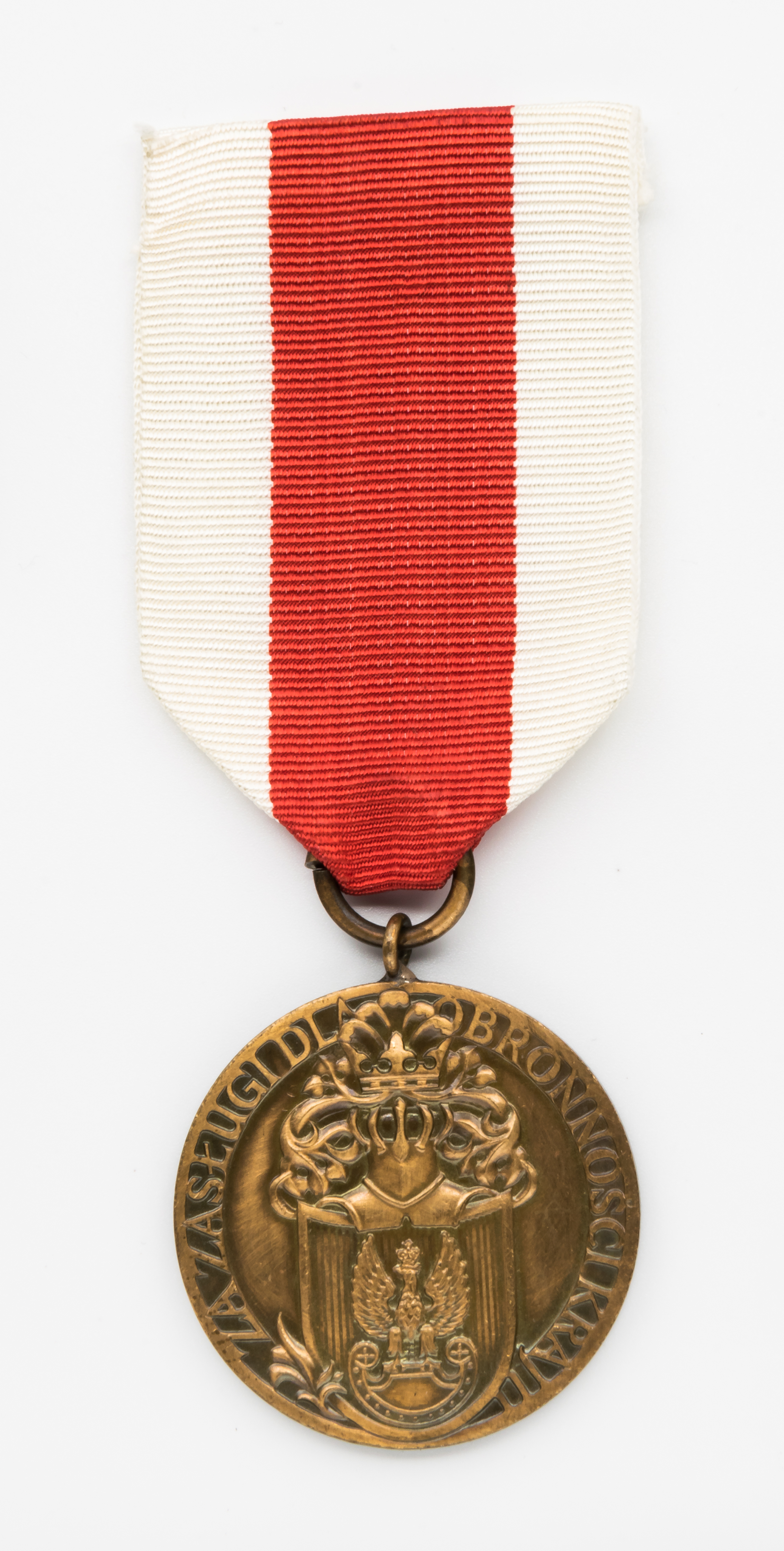
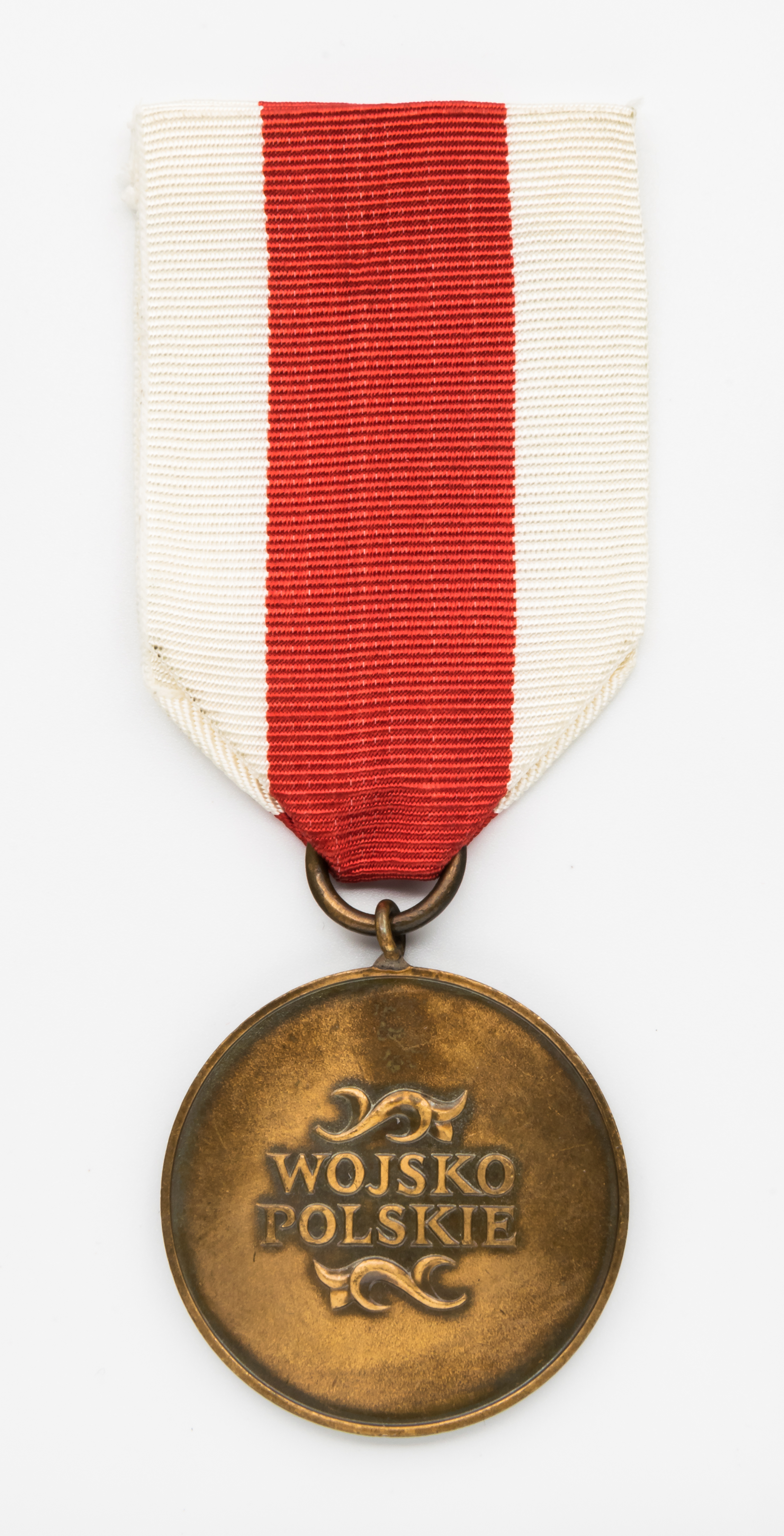
- Obverse and reverse of the brown medal
- Type: Three class medal
- Awarded for: Meritorious activities to strengthen military power of the country.
- Country: Poland
- Presented by: Minister of National Defence
- Eligibility: Polish military personnel and civilian employees of the military
- Established: 21 April 1966
- Ribbon bar for the gold medal Ribbon bar for the silver medal Ribbon bar for the bronze medal

Precedence
- Next (higher): Medal of the Armed Forces in the Service of the Fatherland
- Equivalent: Polish Army Medal
- Next (lower): Medal for Merit to the Police
- Related: Long Service Medal

The Medal of Merit for National Defence (Polish: Medal Za Zasługi dla Obronności Kraju) is a decoration of the Ministry of National Defence of Poland. Established 21 April 1966 and revised in 1991, the medal recognizes meritorious service which strengthens the military of the Republic of Poland. Members of the Polish military and civilian employees are eligible for this medal. The equivalent award that is presented to foreign nationals is the Polish Army Medal.
