= Mieczysław Dębicki (politician) =

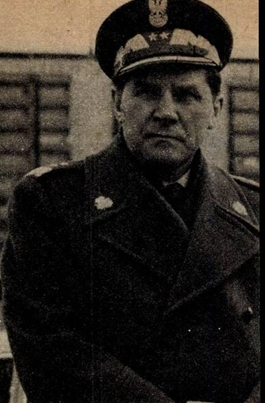

Mayor of Warsaw
- In office 18 February 1982 – 31 July 1986
- Preceded by: Jerzy Majewski
- Succeeded by: Jerzy Bolesławski

Personal details
- Born: 4 September 1926 Pikułowice, Second Polish Republic
- Died: 7 March 2001 (aged 74) Warsaw, Poland
- Resting place: Powązki Military Cemetery
- Party: Polish United Workers' Party
- Education: Świerczewski General Staff Academy
- Occupation: Military officer, politician
- Awards

Military service
- Branch/service: Home Army; Polish People's Army
- Rank: Divisional general
- Commands: Border Protection Forces; Internal Defense Forces
- Battles/wars: World War II

Mieczysław Dębicki (born September 4, 1926 in Pikułowice, died March 7, 2001 in Warsaw) was a Polish military officer and politician, Divisional general of the Polish People's Army, party activist, doctor of historical sciences, head of the Border Protection Forces (1965–1971), deputy secretary and head of the secretariat of the State Defense Committee (1971–1983), Mayor of Warsaw (1982–1986), 1st deputy chief inspector of Territorial Defense Forces - head of the Inspectorate of Territorial Defense and Internal Defense Forces (1986–1988).

== Biography ==
The son of Bartłomiej and Maria (née Biliczak). In March 1944, he joined the 14th Jazlowiec Uhlan Regiment of the Home Army near Lviv. On August 8, 1944, he volunteered for service in the Polish People's Army. He was assigned to the non-commissioned officer school of the 4th Independent Training Battalion of the Kiliński 4th Pomorska Dywizja Piechoty. After graduating on January 1, 1945, he became, with the rank of corporal, deputy company commander of the 11th Infantry Regiment for political and educational matters. He followed the division's combat trail from Warsaw to Kołobrzeg, being wounded in the fighting for Kołobrzeg. He was then assigned to the position of clerk at the headquarters of the 1st Polish Army. From July to November 1945, he studied at Infantry Officer School No. 2 in Gryfice, after graduating from which he was promoted to the rank of warrant officer in the infantry officer corps. Following his promotion, he became a rifle platoon commander, and from September 1946, a training platoon commander at the regimental non-commissioned officer school in the 62nd Infantry Regiment in Ełk. After graduating with a very good grade from the regimental staff officer course at the Infantry Training Center in Rembertów in November 1947, he served in the Border Protection Forces in the following positions: assistant to the deputy commander of the 51st section for reconnaissance of the 11th WOP unit (1947–1948), senior assistant to the head of the training section of the 13th Border Protection Brigade (1948–1949), deputy chief of staff of the 23rd WOP Brigade for operational matters (1949–1951), head of the operations section - deputy chief of staff of the 5th WOP Brigade (1951), senior assistant to the head of the reporting section in the 1st Department of the WOP Command in Warsaw (1951–1952), head of the reporting department of the 1st Department of the WOP Command (1952–1954), head of the Organizational and Records Department of the WOP Command. (1954–1956).

In 1952, he graduated from a general secondary school for workers in Warsaw and passed his matriculation examinations. From 1956 to 1959, he studied at the Świerczewski General Staff Academy in Rembertów, graduating with distinction. After graduation, he became commander of the 16th Kashubian Brigade of the Military Police in Gdańsk (1959–1965). In December 1964, he completed part-time studies at the Faculty of History of the Higher School of Social Sciences at the Central Committee of the Polish United Workers' Party and obtained a master's degree in history.

On November 5, 1965, he became head of the Border Protection Forces (within the structure of the Ministry of National Defense), serving until September 1971. On October 3, 1967, the Council of State of the Polish People's Republic promoted him to the rank of brigadier general. The appointment was presented to him at the Belweder Palace on October 10, 1967, by Chairman of the Council of State, Edward Ochab. From November 1971 to March 1982, he served as Deputy Secretary – Head of the Secretariat of the National Defense Committee. In 1971, he completed the Training Course for Tactical and Operational Leadership of the Land Forces at the Świerczewski General Staff Academy of the Polish People's Army. In September 1974, he obtained a doctorate in military sciences from the Świerczewski General Staff Academy. In October 1975, by resolution of the Council of State of the Polish People's Republic, he was promoted to the rank of major general. The appointment was presented to him on October 10, 1975, at the Belweder Palace by Edward Gierek, First Secretary of the Central Committee of the Polish United Workers' Party.

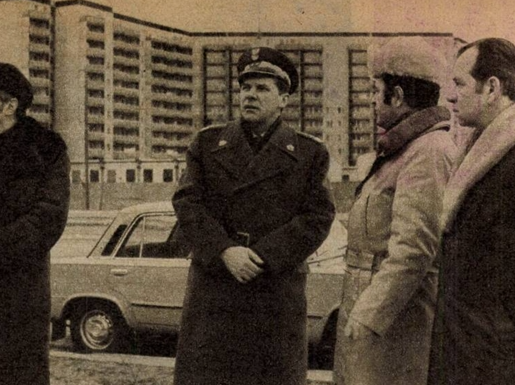
Dębicki as mayor of Warsaw visits the Gocław housing estate, 1986

From February 18, 1982, to May 29, 1986, he served as Mayor of Warsaw. During this period, he was on leave from the Polish People's Army. In July 1986, he returned to military service and assumed the position of Deputy Chief Inspector of Territorial Defense for training outside the military, and then First Deputy Chief Inspector of Territorial Defense Forces – head of the Inspectorate of Territorial Defense and Internal Defense Forces (from December 1986 to December 1988). From January 1989 to October 1990, he served as the government representative of the Polish People's Republic/Poland for the presence of Soviet troops in Poland – chairman of the Polish delegation to the Polish-Soviet Mixed Commission at the Office of the Council of Ministers. In October 1990, he was transferred to the Ministry of National Defence. He retired from professional military service on May 24, 1991.

For many years, he was a member of the governing bodies of the Society of Fighters for Freedom and Democracy, including as president of the Main Court of Peers (from 1976). From 1975 to 1982, he served as vice-president of the Warsaw Board of the Society of Fighters for Freedom and Democracy, and from 1985 to 1990, as a member of the Presidium of the Supreme Council of the Society of Fighters for Freedom and Democracy. He was also vice-chairman of the Community Committee of former soldiers of the 1st and 2nd Armies of the Polish Army and president of the Jan Kiliński Veterans' Club of the Kiliński 4th Pomorska Dywizja Piechoty. In July 1984, he was a member of the Social Committee for the Commemoration of the 40th Anniversary of the Polish People's Republic in Warsaw. From 1990, he was active in the Polish Society of War Veterans. In 2001, he founded the Association of Knights of the Order of the Grunwald Cross, and from 1998 to 2001, he served as president of the Generals' Club of the Polish Armed Forces.

He is buried at the Powązki Military Cemetery in Warsaw (section EII-1-5).

== Awards ==
- Commander's Cross of the Order of Polonia Restituta (1978)
- Officer's Cross of the Order of Polonia Restituta (1968)
- Knight's Cross of the Order of Polonia Restituta (1963)
- Order of the Banner of Labour, 1st Class (1984)
- Order of the Cross of Grunwald, 3rd Class (1973)
- Cross of Valor
- Gold Cross of Merit (1955)
- Silver Cross of Merit (1947)
- Silver Medal for Merit on the Field of Glory – twice in 1946
- Bronze Medal for Merit on the Field of Glory (1945)
- Medal of the 10th Anniversary of People's Poland
- Medal of the 30th Anniversary of People's Poland
- Medal of the 40th Anniversary of People's Poland
- Medal for Oder, Neisse and Baltic (1946)
- Gold Medal of the Armed Forces in the Service of the Fatherland
- Silver Medal of the Armed Forces in the Service of the Fatherland
- Bronze Medal of the Armed Forces in the Service of the Fatherland
- Gold Medal of Merit for National Defence
- Silver Medal of Merit for National Defence (1968)
- Bronze Medal of Merit for National Defence
- Gold Badge “For Merit in Flood Control”
- Gold Krasicki Decoration (1967)
- Gold Medal "For Polish Former Soldiers of the Red Army" (1983)
- Badge "For Merit to the Union of Fighters for Freedom and Democracy" (1982)
- Badge of the 25th Anniversary of the National Defense League (1970)
- Medal "100 Years of the Labor Movement in Poland" (1983)
- Golden Badge of Honour "For Merit to Warsaw" (1970)
- Golden Badge of Honour "For Merit to Warsaw" (1986)
- Badge of Honor "For Merit to Gdańsk" (1960)
- Order of the Patriotic War, 1st Class (USSR, 1968)
- Medal "For the Victory over Germany in the Great Patriotic War 1941–1945" (USSR, 1945)
- Medal for Warsaw 1939–1945 (USSR, 1946)
- Medal "For Strengthening of Brotherhood in Arms" (USSR, 1981)[13]
- Jubilee Medal "Twenty Years of Victory in the Great Patriotic War 1941–1945" (USSR)
- Jubilee Medal "Thirty Years of Victory in the Great Patriotic War 1941–1945" (USSR)
- Jubilee Medal "Forty Years of Victory in the Great Patriotic War 1941–1945" (USSR)
- Jubilee Medal "60 Years of the Armed Forces of the USSR" (USSR)
- Commemorative Badge of the Soviet War Veterans Committee (USSR)
- Medal "30 Years of the Revolutionary Armed Forces of the Republic of Cuba" (Cuba, 1987)
- Medal "For Strengthening Friendship of the Armed Forces," 3rd Class (Czechoslovak Socialist Republic, 1970)
- Golden Patriotic Order of Merit (German Democratic Republic) (1975)
