= Wacław Czyżewski =

Polish military commander and communist activist

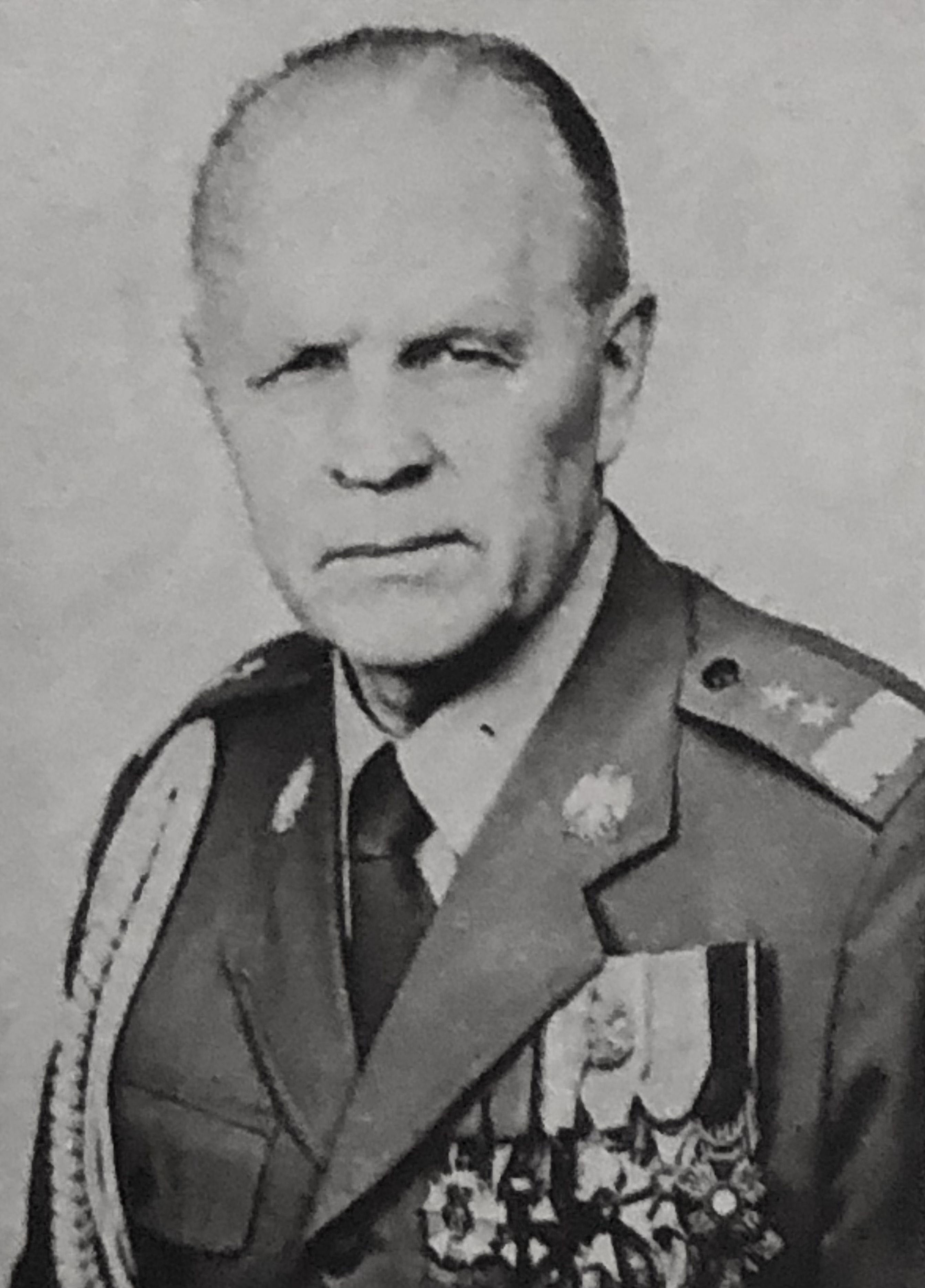

Personal details
- Born: Wacław Raś; 25 April 1917 Zielonka, Poland
- Died: 30 January 2002 (aged 84) Warsaw, Poland
- Party: Polish United Workers' Party

Military service
- Branch/service: Polish People's Army
- Rank: Divisional general
- Commands: 1st Mechanized Division; Internal Defense Forces

Wacław Czyżewski (real name Wacław Raś, pseudonyms Kora, Im; 25 April 1917 – 30 January 2002) was a Polish military commander and communist activist. He was officer of the People's Guard and People's Army, Divisional general of the Polish People's Army, deputy commander of the Silesian Military District (1959–1963), deputy commandant of the Military University of Technology (1963–1968), head of the Polish mission in the International Commission of Control and Supervision in Korea (1968–1969), chief of the Internal Defense Forces (1970–1974), and deputy chief inspector of the Territorial Defense Forces (1974–1984).

== Biography ==
Czyżewski was born on 25 April 1917 in Zielonka. In the 1930s, he worked in Warsaw as a bricklayer and was associated with the communist movement – he was active in the Union of Rural Youth of the Republic of Poland "Wici" and the Trade Union of Construction Workers, which remained under the influence of the KPP; the information he himself gave in his biographies about his membership in the Young Communist League of Poland and Communist Party of Poland is uncertain. On 12 August 1940, he was arrested by the Germans during a roundup, and escaped from a rail transport.

From 1941, he was an activist of the Workers' and Peasants' Combat Organization, then one of the organizers and activists of the Polish Workers' Party in the Lublin Voivodeship. Officer of the People's Guard and the People's Army, postal commissioner, district secretary and head of the department in the AL Lublin District. Commander of the security of the Main Staff of the People's Army and commander of the personal security of Michał Rola-Żymierski.

He served in the Polish People's Army since 1944, commander of the SG security, from 1946 commander of an infantry regiment. In the early 1950s he was dismissed from the army and subjected to repressions, after October 1956 he returned to service. In 1957 he was promoted to brigadier general, and in 1970 to Divisional general.

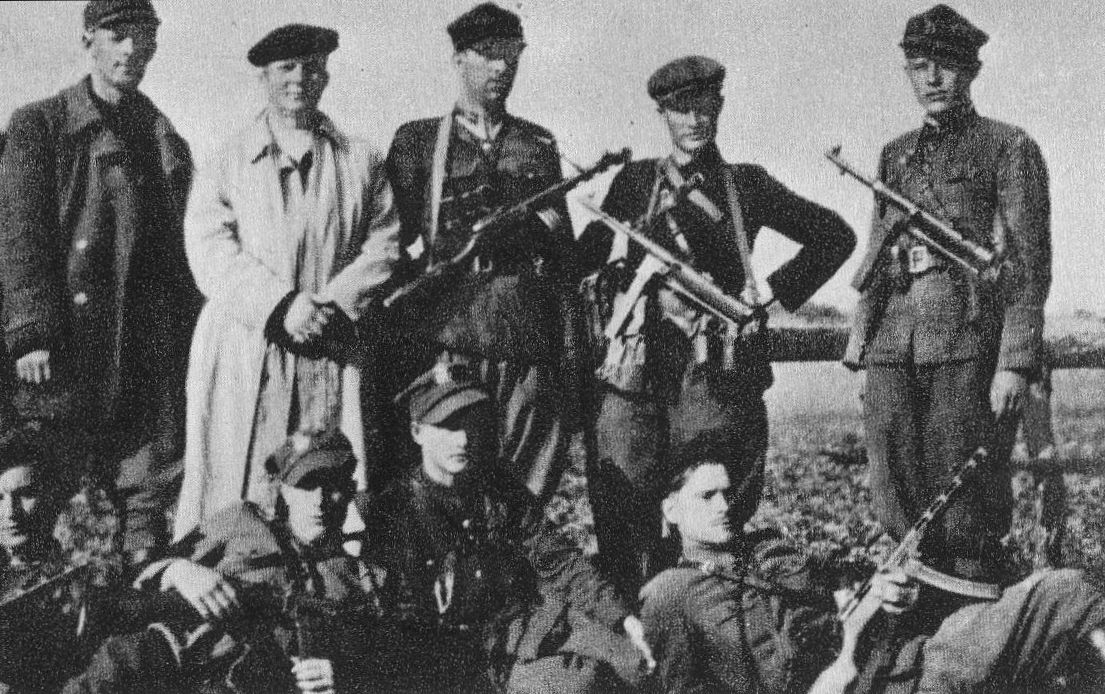
Wacław Czyżewski (standing first from the right) in the partisan movement, 1944

From 1956 to 1959 he served as commander of the 1st Mechanized Division, deputy commander of the Silesian Military District for line affairs (1959–1963), deputy commander of the Military Technical Academy for line affairs (1963–1968), head of the Polish mission to the International Commission of Control and Supervision in Korea (1968–1969), chief of the Internal Defense Forces (1970–1974), and from 1974 deputy Chief Inspector of Territorial Defense Forces for paramilitary organizations. He retired since 1984 following a farewell by the Minister of National Defense Florian Siwicki in connection with the end of his professional military service. He was a member of the Polish Workers' Party and then Polish United Workers' Party. From May 1972 to 1985 he was vice-president of the Main Board of the Society of Fighters for Freedom and Democracy. He published memoirs from the occupation years (So zarepetuj broni). In the 1980s, he headed the Committee for the Construction of the Monument to the Fallen in the Service and Defense of the Polish People's Republic, which was unveiled in Warsaw on 22 July 1985.

His son is Piotr Czyżewski, Minister of the State Treasury in the cabinet of Leszek Miller.

== Awards ==
- Commander's Cross of the Order of Polonia Restituta
- Officer's Cross of the Order of Polonia Restituta
- Knight's Cross of the Order of Polonia Restituta
- Order of the Banner of Labour, 1st Class
- Order of the Banner of Labour, 2nd Class
- Order of the Cross of Grunwald, 3rd Class
- Cross of Valour
- Partisan Cross
- Golden Cross of Merit (1946)
- Medal for Warsaw 1939–1945
- Medal for Oder, Neisse and Baltic
- Medal of Victory and Freedom 1945
- Medal "For Participation in the Fights in Defence of People's Power"
- Medal of the 30th Anniversary of People's Poland
- Medal of the 40th Anniversary of People's Poland
- Gold Medal of the Armed Forces in the Service of the Fatherland
- Silver Medal of the Armed Forces in the Service of the Fatherland
- Bronze Medal of the Armed Forces in the Service of the Fatherland
- Medal for Participation in the Battle of Berlin
- Gold Medal of Merit for National Defence
- Silver Medal of Merit for National Defence
- Bronze Medal of Merit for National Defence
- Grunwald Badge
- Medal "100 Years of the Workers' Movement in Poland" (1982)
- Medal of Ludwik Waryński (1986)
- Medal "For Long, Devoted Service" (awarded by the Minister of National Defense, 1983)
- Silver Badge of Honor "For Merits for Warsaw" (1970)
- Badge of Honor "For Merits for the Lublin Region" (1969)
- Entry in the Honorary Book of Soldiers' Deeds (9 May 1985)
- Czechoslovak War Cross 1939–1945 (Czechoslovakia)
- Order of the Red Banner (Soviet Union)
- Medal "For the Liberation of Warsaw" (Soviet Union)
- Medal "For the Victory over Germany in the Great Patriotic War 1941–1945" (Soviet Union)
- Jubilee Medal "Twenty Years of Victory in the Great Patriotic War 1941–1945" (Soviet Union)
- Jubilee Medal "Thirty Years of Victory in the Great Patriotic War 1941–1945" (Soviet Union)
- Jubilee Medal "Forty Years of Victory in the Great Patriotic War 1941–1945" (Soviet Union)
