= Grzegorz Korczyński =

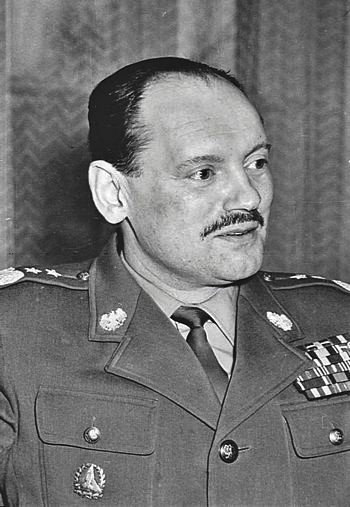

Polish Ambassador to Algeria
- In office 6 August 1971 – 30 September 1971
- Preceded by: Edward Wychowaniec
- Succeeded by: Stanisław Matosek

Secretary of the State Defense Committee
- In office 1967–1971
- Preceded by: Wojciech Jaruzelski
- Succeeded by: Tadeusz Tuczapski

Member of the PZPR Central Committee
- In office 19 March 1959 – 22 October 1971

Personal details
- Born: 17 June 1915 Brzeziny, Kingdom of Poland
- Died: 22 October 1971 (aged 56) Algiers, Algeria
- Resting place: Powązki Military Cemetery
- Party: Polish United Workers' Party
- Education: Świerczewski General Staff Academy
- Occupation: Military officer, politician
- Awards

Military service
- Branch/service: Armia Ludowa; Polish People's Army
- Rank: Generał broni
- Commands: Territorial Defense Forces
- Battles/wars: Spanish Civil War; World War II (Zamość uprising); December 1970 events

Grzegorz Jan Korczyński, born Stefan Jan Kilanowicz, pseudonym "Grzegorz", "Korczyński" (born June 17, 1915 in Brzeziny, died October 22, 1971 in Algiers) was a Polish communist activist, officer of the Gwardia Ludowa and Armia Ludowa, Generał broni of the Polish People's Army, Assistant to the Minister of Public Security for Operations (1946–1948), Chief of the Second Directorate of the General Staff of the Polish People's Army (military intelligence) (1956–1965), Deputy Minister of National Defense (1965–1971), member of the Central Committee of the Polish United Workers' Party (PZPR) (1959–1971) and member of the Sejm of the Polish People's Republic in the 3rd, 4th, and 5th terms.

== Biography ==
Son of Szczepan and Antonina. His brother, Jerzy Kilanowicz, was also a communist activist, an officer of the Gwardia Ludowa and Armia Ludowa, and a functionary of the Security Service. He attended the Józef Sowiński Municipal Secondary School No. 1 in Warsaw. After his father's death in 1932, he dropped out of high school in the seventh grade. He worked as a laborer, messenger, tutor, and clerk. He was a member of the "Życie" Socialist Youth Organization. He was fired from his last job – at a hospital on Karowa Street in Warsaw – after a conflict with his superiors. In early 1937, he left for Spain, where he participated in the Civil War, fighting on the Republican side until 1939 in the Jarosław Dąbrowski 13th Brigade, part of the International Brigades.

In 1940, he headed the Central Party Technology Department, and later the People's Aid Department, in the Polish section of the French Communist Party. He also edited its newspaper, "Solidarity". In 1942, he directed sabotage and diversion in the Paris district. In August 1942, he was transferred from France to Poland with a group of Dąbrowszczaks by the commander of the People's Guard, Bolesław Mołojec. From 1942, he was a member of the Polish Workers' Party and the People's Guard. He was sent by the High Command of the People's Guard to the Lublin region to form partisan units. He was the commander of the Kościuszko Operational Group unit operating in the southern Lublin region. Władysław Gomułka stated in his memoirs that he "earned the reputation of being the best commander among the partisan unit commanders in the entire country".

On September 14, 1942, his unit destroyed railway equipment in Szastarka, disarmed a policeman, and confiscated money from the cash register. The next day, he destroyed equipment at the station in Rzeczyca, then set fire to a military train traveling east (burning the transport of aircraft engines), and crashed a German car on the Rzeczyca-Potok road, capturing weapons and ammunition. On September 24, he fought a victorious battle near Sweden against a company of German gendarmes (10 gendarmes were killed and 7 wounded; the guards lost 1 killed and 1 wounded). On October 9, 1942, he destroyed the municipal office, post office, and dairy in Trzydnik Duży, freed one person from custody, and confiscated money and a typewriter. Then, on the night of October 9–10, he attacked the prison in Kraśnik and freed several dozen prisoners, including Edward Marszałek, a PPR activist closely associated with the unit. On October 14, he fought a skirmish with the Germans near Łysaków. On November 7, his unit destroyed the concentration camp near Janiszów, freeing 500 Jewish prisoners and killing the camp commandant, Peter Ignor.

According to historians who cite materials from the Stalinist investigation into Korczyński, between November 1942 and February 1943, in the village of Ludmiłówka and its vicinity in Kraśnik County, the commander and his subordinate partisans allegedly murdered approximately 100 Jews (mostly women and children). According to Piotr Gontarczyk, the crime was robbery in nature. In the early 1950s, the authorities arrested Korczyński and his companions because of the alleged murder. Ryszard Nazarewicz denies any racist murders committed by Korczyński. He believes that his accusation was based on fabricated materials, mainly by Józef Światło, prepared for the trial of Władysław Gomułka and other activists between 1949 and 1955 in the 10th Department of the Ministry of Public Security. He claims that the murders of Jews were related to the liquidation of a group composed of Poles and Jews known as the "Grochalski gang," which in late 1942 murdered several members of the headquarters of the Kościuszko Operational Group group in the Kraśnik region and robbed, among other things, the group's treasury. Grzegorz Korczyński himself allegedly dragged his wife's parents out of the ghetto and hid them with his own family during the occupation, and during the war had several dozen Jewish partisans in his entourage. Nazarewicz also stated that the information regarding Korczyński's pogroms were "slander" intended to discredit the Gwardia Ludowa. and that the investigation materials used by right-wing historians were fabricated by the Ministry of Public Security. The same historian reported that, according to information gathered after de-Stalinization by the ruling party, the General Prosecutor's Office, and the Provincial Court in Warsaw, Korczyński was accused of committing non-existent crimes or those committed by the National Armed Forces and other perpetrators. Furthermore, Korczyński's case files did not include documents favoring the commander. This included the testimony of Jewish partisans who were under Korczyński's command until the end of the war (including 35 from the Ludmiłówka area). Korczyński himself was later cleared of the pogrom charges..

In mid-February 1943, Korczyński's unit, transformed by the People's Guard command into the Kościuszko Operational Group, set off for the Zamość region to engage in combat against German pacification forces. The unit numbered approximately 300 men. On July 27, 1943, near Modliborzyce, partisans from the Operational Group of the General Staff "Grzegorz" ambushed several German passenger cars, killing a dozen or so Germans returning from Lublin after a meeting led by Hans Frank, including Kreishauptmann Karl Adam and other Nazi officials from Biłgoraj; the cars were burned. In August 1943, units under Korczyński's command, along with Soviet units, were forced, as a result of Nazi anti-partisan operations codenamed "Wehrwolf", to abandon their bases and fight their way from the Solska Forest toward the Carpathians. After crossing the San River, a major battle erupted near the villages of Kończyce and Nowosielec. Further advance was impossible, as the area was controlled by Ukrainian nationalist forces. Grzegorz Korczyński and his soldiers again crossed the San River to reach the Lipsko forests. In September 1943, he went to Warsaw, where he was promoted to lieutenant colonel and took over as head of the operations department of the General Staff of the Armia Ludowa. From June 1944, he was commander of the Lublin District of the People's Army. In 1945, he pacified villages in the Lublin region deemed to be collaborating with anti-communist partisans.

From March 15, 1946, to September 5, 1948, he served as Undersecretary of State and Assistant Minister for Operational Affairs at the Ministry of Public Security (supervising the work of Department I, Independent Department I, the Information Directorate, the Internal Security Corps, and the Main Censorship Office). In 1947, he was deputy commander of the "Wisła" Operational Group for security during Operation Vistula. He approved and then personally supervised the first mass execution in a forest near Liszna (May 22, 1947) of 22 Ukrainians (mostly Ukrainian Insurgent Army partisans) sentenced to death, including 22-year-old Rozalia Mińko. His signature appears on the transport lists of Ukrainians sent from UB detention centers to the Jaworzno concentration camp. In August 1948, he was demoted from a member of the PPR Central Committee to an alternate member for "ideological instability and conciliation towards right-wing nationalist deviations".

He was arrested on May 21, 1950, by an operational group of the Special Bureau of the Ministry of Public Security. After four years of investigation, he was accused and sentenced on May 22, 1954, to life imprisonment for, among other things, murdering Polish and Jewish people. The MBP also intended to use the evidence to persuade Korczyński to testify against Władysław Gomułka. He was imprisoned from 1950 to 1956. On December 24, 1954, the Supreme Court commuted his sentence to 15 years in prison. He was released during the political "thaw" in April 1956. In July of that year, the then First Secretary of the Central Committee of the Polish United Workers' Party, Edward Ochab, informed the Central Committee plenum that his party card had been restored. At the request of the Prosecutor General's Office, the Supreme Court, in its order of November 10, 1956, reopened the proceedings and overturned the conviction, justifying the overturn by stating that the investigation by the Ministry of Public Security was conducted in a biased manner, and that his arrest on espionage charges was motivated by "the desire to extort testimony incriminating Władysław Gomułka". During the investigation, Korczyński was subjected to physical and psychological coercion. By order of the Prosecutor General of January 12, 1957, the investigation against him was discontinued. Korczyński was judicially rehabilitated.

From the end of December 1956 to July 1965, he was head of the Second Intelligence Directorate of the General Staff of the Polish People's Army – military intelligence. He served as Deputy Minister of National Defense from 1965 to 1971. From 1965, he served as Chief Inspector of Territorial Defense Forces, and in 1968, he held the rank of Lieutenant General.

He was one of the few people who publicly, in the presence of Władysław Gomułka, dared to engage in polemics and criticize his actions. This was explained by their special familiarity with Korczyński, who, despite repression during the Stalinist era, did not oppose "Wiesław".

From 1967 to 1971 he served as the secretary of the State Defense Committee.

During the March 1968 events, he belonged to Mieczysław Moczar's inner-party "partisans faction" In December 1970, he commanded army units pacifying workers' demonstrations in Gdańsk. He was one of the main perpetrators of the massacres of workers during those events, and was removed from his positions and subsequently sent as the Polish People's Republic's ambassador to Algeria. He died there on October 22, 1971, according to the official version, from an Amoeba infection.

An activist in the Polish Workers' Party and the Polish United Workers' Party. From 1959 to 1971, he was a member of the Central Committee of the PZPR. From 1961 to 1971, he was a member of the Sejm of the Polish People's Republic for the 3rd, 4th, and 5th terms from the Radzyń County. From 1969, he was a member of the Presidium of the Main Board of the Society of Fighters for Freedom and Democracy.

He was buried in the Alley of the Meritorious at the Powązki Military Cemetery (section B2-tuje-12). The funeral was attended by, among others, members of the Politburo of the Polish United Workers' Party (PZPR) Central Committee and the Secretariat of the Polish United Workers' Party Central Committee: Stefan Jędrychowski, Mieczysław Moczar, Minister of National Defense Lieutenant General Wojciech Jaruzelski, Stanisław Kania, Franciszek Szlachcic, as well as former First Secretary of the PZPR Central Committee Władysław Gomułka (as a private citizen). Mieczysław Moczar bid farewell to General Korczyński on behalf of the PZPR leadership, and Deputy Minister of National Defense Major General on behalf of the Ministry of National Defense. Józef Urbanowicz, on behalf of the leadership of the Ministry of Foreign Affairs, Deputy Minister of Foreign Affairs Stanisław Trepczyński, and on behalf of the community of soldiers of the People's Army, retired Colonel Paweł Dąbek.

== Awards ==
- Order of the Banner of Labour, 1st Class (1956)
- Commander's Cross with Star of the Order of Polonia Restituta (1964)
- Order of the Cross of Grunwald, 2nd Class (1945)
- Commander's Cross of the Order of Polonia Restituta (1947)
- Order of the Cross of Grunwald, 3rd Class (25 December 1943 – one of the first awards)
- Officer's Cross of the Order of Polonia Restituta (1945)
- Gold Cross of the Order of Virtuti Militari (1945)
- Silver Cross of the Order of Virtuti Militari (1945)
- Gold Cross of Merit (1946)
- Cross of Valour (1945)
- Partisan Cross (1946)
- Medal "For Your Freedom and Ours" (1956)
- Medal for Warsaw 1939–1945 (1946)
- Medal of Victory and Freedom 1945
- Gold Medal of the Armed Forces in the Service of the Fatherland (1958)
- Silver Medal of the Armed Forces in the Service of the Fatherland
- Bronze Medal of the Armed Forces in the Service of the Fatherland
- Medal of the 10th Anniversary of People's Poland
- Silver Medal of Merit for National Defence (1968)
- Bronze Medal of Merit for National Defence
- Badge of the 1000th Anniversary of the Polish State (1966)
- Grunwald Badge
- Gold Badge "For Merit in Flood Control"
- Golden Krasicki Decoration (1966)
- Badge "20 Years in the Service of the Nation" (1964)
- Honorary Badge of the Friends of Scouting Movement (1966)
- Golden Badge of the Association of Volunteer Fire Departments (1968)
- Medal of the 100th Anniversary of Polish Sport (1968)
- Medal of the "50th Anniversary of Sport Aviation in Poland" (1969)
- Golden Badge of Honor "For Merit to the City of Lublin" (1962)
- Honorary Badge "For Merit to Gdańsk" (1964)
- Golden Badge of Honour "For Merit to Warsaw" (1966)
- Honorary Badge "For Merit to the Lublin Region" (1969)
- Order of Lenin (Soviet Union, 1968)
- Jubilee Medal "In Commemoration of the 100th Anniversary of the Birth of Vladimir Ilyich Lenin" (Soviet Union, 1970)
- Medal "For the Victory over Germany in the Great Patriotic War 1941–1945" (Soviet Union, 1945)
- Medal "For the Liberation of Warsaw" (Soviet Union)
- Jubilee Medal "Twenty Years of Victory in the Great Patriotic War 1941–1945" (Soviet Union, 1965)
- Badge "25 Years of Victory in the Great Patriotic War 1941–1945" (Soviet Union, 1970)
- Jubilee Medal "30 Years of the Soviet Army and Navy" (Soviet Union, 1965)
- Medal 25th Anniversary of the Bulgarian People's Army (Bulgarian People's Republic, 1969)
- Dukielski Medal Pamiątkowy (Czechoslovakia, 1967)
- Order of the Gold Star, 1st Class (Czechoslovakia)
- Medal "For the Liberation of Czechoslovakia" (Czechoslovakia)
- Dukla Commemorative Medal (Czechoslovakia, 1961)
- Medal "For Strengthening Friendship of the Armed Forces", 1st Class (Czechoslovakia, 1970)
- Hans Beimler Medal (East Germany, 1966)
- Order of the People's Army with Laurel Wreath (Yugoslavia, 1967)
- Order "For Merit to the Nation" (Yugoslavia)
- Order of Bravery, 1st Class (Yugoslavia, 1946)
