= Broniewski =

Broniewski (feminine Broniewska) is a Polish surname. Notable people include:

- Janina Broniewska, Polish writer
- Kajetan Broniewski, Polish rower
- Stanisław Broniewski, Polish economist and scout leader
- Władysław Broniewski, Polish poet and soldier

== See also ==
- Mieczysław Broniewski Tenement, an apartment building in Warsaw, Poland
