= 2nd Podlaski Signal Regiment of the Internal Defense Forces =

- 2 Podlaski Pułk Łączności Wojsk Obrony Wewnętrznej
- Active: 1976-1989
- Country: Polish People's Republic
- Allegiance: Polish People's Army
- Branch: Territorial Defense Forces
- Type: Internal Defense Forces communication regiment
- Part of: Warsaw Military District
- Garrison/HQ: Białystok

2nd Podlaski Signal Regiment of the Internal Defense Forces (Polish: 2 Podlaski Pułk Łączności Wojsk Obrony Wewnętrznej (2 pł WOWew)) was a communications unit of the Internal Defense Forces.

== History ==
The regiment was formed on the basis of the order of the Chief of the General Staff of the Polish People's Army No. 044/Org. of July 14, 1976.

The unit was organized in the Białystok military base at 70 Kawaleryjska street. in on the basis of the liquidated 2nd Podlaska Brigade of the Internal Defense Forces and three disbanded units of the same type of troops: the 21st and 72nd Communications Battalions and the 74th Radio and Cable Battalion.

Pursuant to the order of the Chief of the General Staff of the Polish Army No. 0103/Org. On August 28, 1989, the regiment was disbanded. The barracks were taken over by the 25th Signal Regiment, deployed from Modlin.
