= National Security Council (Poland) =

Constitutional body of the Polish president

- Rada Bezpieczeństwa Narodowego

Agency overview
- Formed: 1992; 34 years ago
- Preceding agency: State Defense Committee
- Jurisdiction: Poland
- Headquarters: Warsaw, Poland
- Agency executive: Chairman, President Andrzej Duda

National Security Council (Polish: Rada Bezpieczeństwa Narodowego [ˈra.da bɛs.pjɛˈt͡ʂɛɲ.stfa na.rɔ.dɔˈvɛ.ɡɔ]) is a constitutional advisory body to the President of the Republic of Poland in the field of internal and external security of the state.

== History ==
The origins of the creation of the National Security Council can be traced back to the Polish People's Republic with the existence of the State Defense Committee, established in 1967. With the end of communism in Poland and the political transformation the country had gone through, the State Defense Committee, did not enjoy the trust of the new authorities of the Polish state as it was too strongly associated with the past period which was the reason Lech Wałęsa took steps to liquidate it at the beginning of his presidency. The need for a modern national emerged also with the restitution of the office of the President of Poland made under the Small Constitution of 1992 and granting the head of state serious powers in the military sphere, defence and security of the state. While the National Security Council was established in 1992, the State Defense Committee continued to exist up until 2002.

== Organization and competences ==
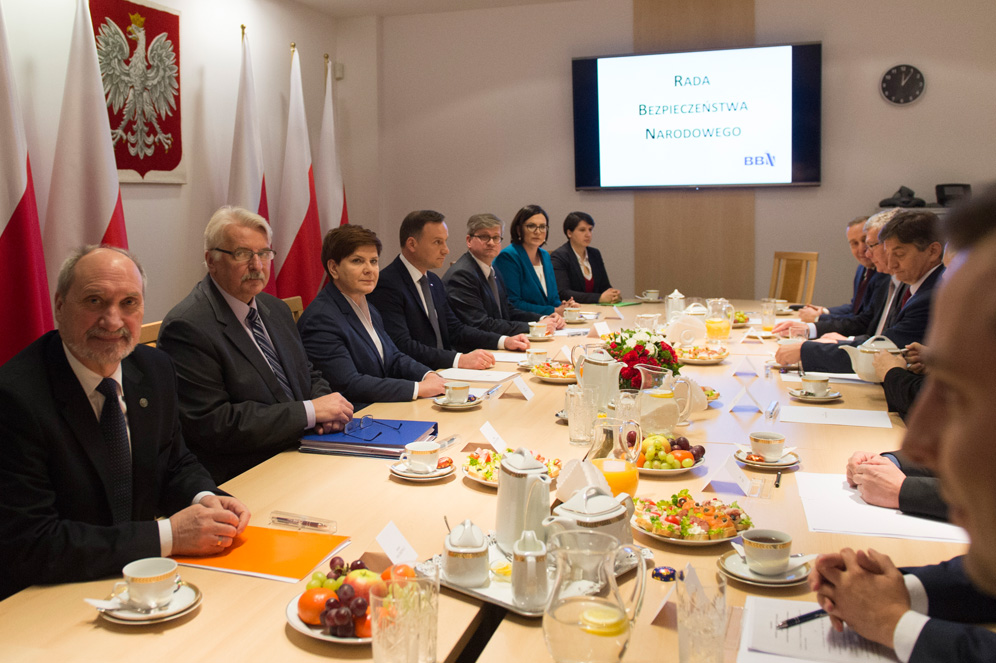
Meeting of the council

The council operates pursuant to Article 135 of the Constitution of Poland. According to Article 144, paragraphs 1 and 3, item 26 of the Constitution, the appointment and dismissal of members of the National Security Council is the exclusive competence of the president of the Republic of Poland and is made by means of a resolution that does not require the countersignature of the Prime Minister. Apart from the provisions of the Constitution, there is no other generally applicable act of law that would concern the activities of the council.

The internal procedure for the council's operation was established after 13 years of the Constitution's adoption, on 24 May 2010, by way of the issuance by the Marshal of the Sejm, acting as president of the Republic of Poland, Bronisław Komorowski, of an order on the procedure for the operation of the National Security Council.

In accordance with the above order, the council deliberates at sessions convened by the president. The president also chairs the sessions of the council; in the event of his absence, these competences are assumed by a member of the council indicated by him. The meetings are held at the seat of the National Security Bureau, which also provides the council with organizational, technical, and financial support. The council meetings are prepared by the secretary of the council, who is ex officio the head of the National Security Bureau. Unless the president orders otherwise, the council meetings are closed to the public.

The council meetings are attended by members of the council, as well as, at the president's invitation, other persons who are not members of the council, such as former presidents and prime ministers and other persons whose participation is indicated due to the subject of the matters under consideration.
