= Henryk Toruńczyk =

Polish soldier (1909–1966)

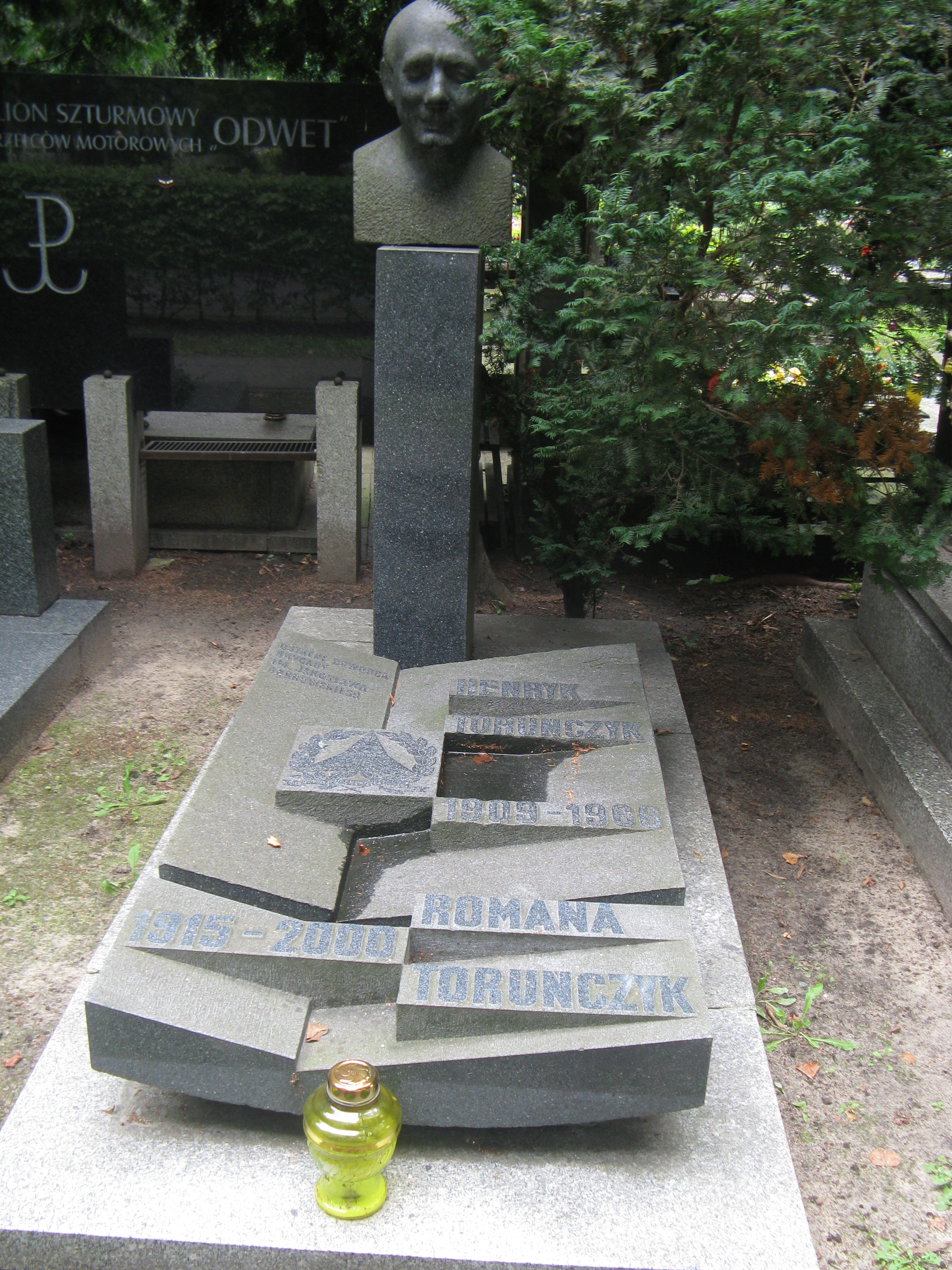
- Roman Toruńczyk's grave at the Powązki Military Cemetery
- Born: 8 February 1909; Włocławek, Russian Empire
- Died: 18 January 1966 (aged 56); Warsaw, Polish People's Republic
- Burial place: Powązki Military Cemetery, Warsaw
- Military career
- Allegiance: Polish People's Republic
- Branch: International Brigades; Polish People's Army
- Rank: Pułkownik (Colonel)
- Units: XIII International Brigade; Polish Independent Special Battalion; Internal Security Corps
- Commands: Commander of the XIII International Brigade; Commander of the Internal Security Corps
- Conflicts: Spanish Civil War; Second World War
- Awards

Col. Henryk Torunczyk, born in Włocławek, (1909–1966) was a Polish soldier. He later volunteered to fight with the International Brigades in the Spanish Civil War. He was sometime commander of the Naftali Botwin Company; Chief of Staff of XIII International Brigade and leader of an International Unit formed in January 1939 from a rump of Brigade veterans who remained in Spain after demoblisation. They crossed the border in Spain on about 9 January 1939 He later became a partisan. From 1943 he was instrumental in forming the Samodzielny Batalion Szturmowy. In 1945 he was briefly commanding officer of the Polish Internal Security Corps.

He is also called: Henrik Torunczyk and Henrik Tourunczyk.

== Awards and decorations ==
- Order of the Banner of Labour]], 1st Class
- Commander's Cross of the Order of Polonia Restituta (13 July 1955)
- Order of the Cross of Grunwald, 3rd Class
- Gold Cross of Virtuti Militari
- Partisan Cross
- Medal "For Your Freedom and Ours"
- Order of the Patriotic War, 2nd Class (USSR)

== See also ==
- Hugh Thomas, The Spanish Civil War, 4th Rev. Ed. 2001.
- Antony Beevor, The Battle for Spain, 2007.
- Cecil Eby, Comrades and Commissars, 2007.
