= Mieczysław Broniewski Tenement =

Tenement in Warsaw, Poland

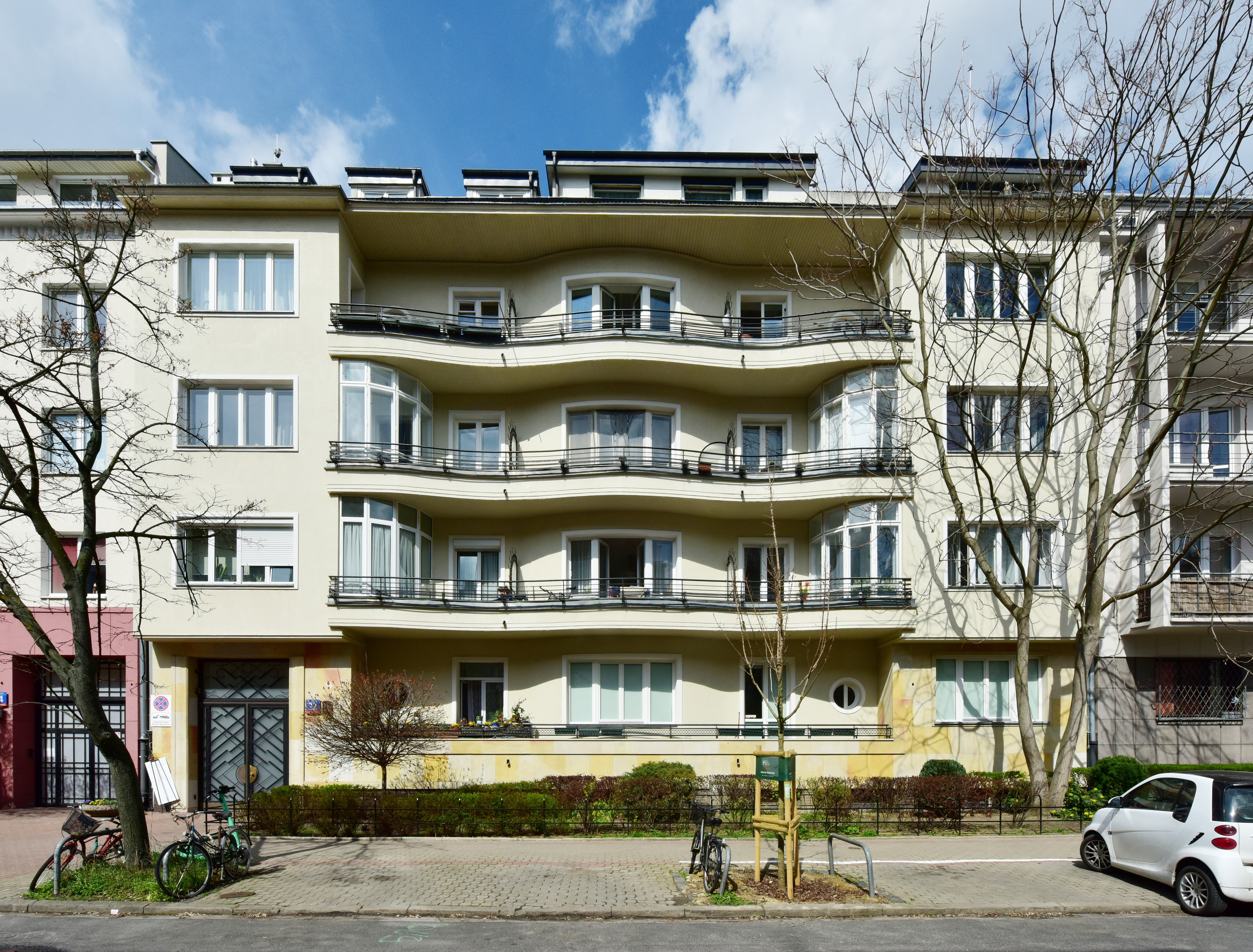
- The building in 2023.

General information
- Type: Tenement
- Location: 22 Narbutta Street, Downtown, Warsaw, Poland
- Coordinates: 52°12′24″N 21°01′01″E
- Construction started: 1937
- Completed: 1938
- Owner: Mieczysław Broniewski (original)

Technical details
- Floor count: 6

Design and construction
- Architects: Antoni Jawornicki (original); J. Krotkiewski (1945 reconstruction)
- Developer: Mieczysław Broniewski

The Mieczysław Broniewski Tenement (Polish pronunciation: [mjɛˈt͡ʂɘ̟.swaf brɔˈɲɛf.ski]; Polish: Kamienica Mieczysława Broniewskiego) is an International Style tenement in Warsaw, Poland, within the Mokotów district. It is located at 22 Narbutta Street, within the neighbourhood of Old Mokotów. It was designed by Antoni Jawornicki, and built between 1937 and 1938. It was modified in 1945, with addition of a 6th storey.

== History ==
The building was designed by architect Antoni Jawornicki in the International Style, with the elements of the Art Deco and Baroque Revival styles. It was built between 1937 and 1938, as a luxurious tenement building for Mieczysław Broniewski, a businessperson who owned several confectionery stores in Warsaw. The building originally featured both housing and office spaces.

During the Second World War, the building was seized by the German government, and houses the dental clinic for the officers of the Protection Squadron. It was damaged during the Warsaw Uprising in 1944. It underwent renovations after the war, beginning in February 1945, with project designed by J. Krotkiewski. The building was modified, with addition of a 6th storey, and with some of its circler windows being bricked up. Its interior was remodeled to only feature housing units, and the building was designated as residentce for the employees of the Warsaw Reconstruction Office and the Polish Radio. One of its residents became Zygmunt Dworakowski, the chairperson of the presidium of the National City Council of the Capital City of Warsaw, the equivalent the current office of the mayor of Warsaw.

== Design ==
The tenement building has an International Style façade lied with Baroque Revival elements, lied with the sandstone, and with the semi-basement lied with clinker brick. The building also features an Art Deco gate and balusters. In the front, it has wide waved loggias and porthole-like circular windows. The building has a reinforced concrete structure, measures six storeys, including a semi-basement.
