= Ludmiłówka =

- Village
- Location within Poland
- Coordinates: 50°56′N 22°1′E
- Country: Poland
- Voivodeship: Lublin
- County: Kraśnik
- Gmina: Dzierzkowice
- Population: 530

Ludmiłówka [ludmiˈwufka] is a village in the administrative district of Gmina Dzierzkowice, within Kraśnik County, Lublin Voivodeship, in eastern Poland.

During the Holocaust, Grzegorz Korczyński's partisans murdered here about 100 Jews in 1942/1943.
