= Jerzy Majewski =

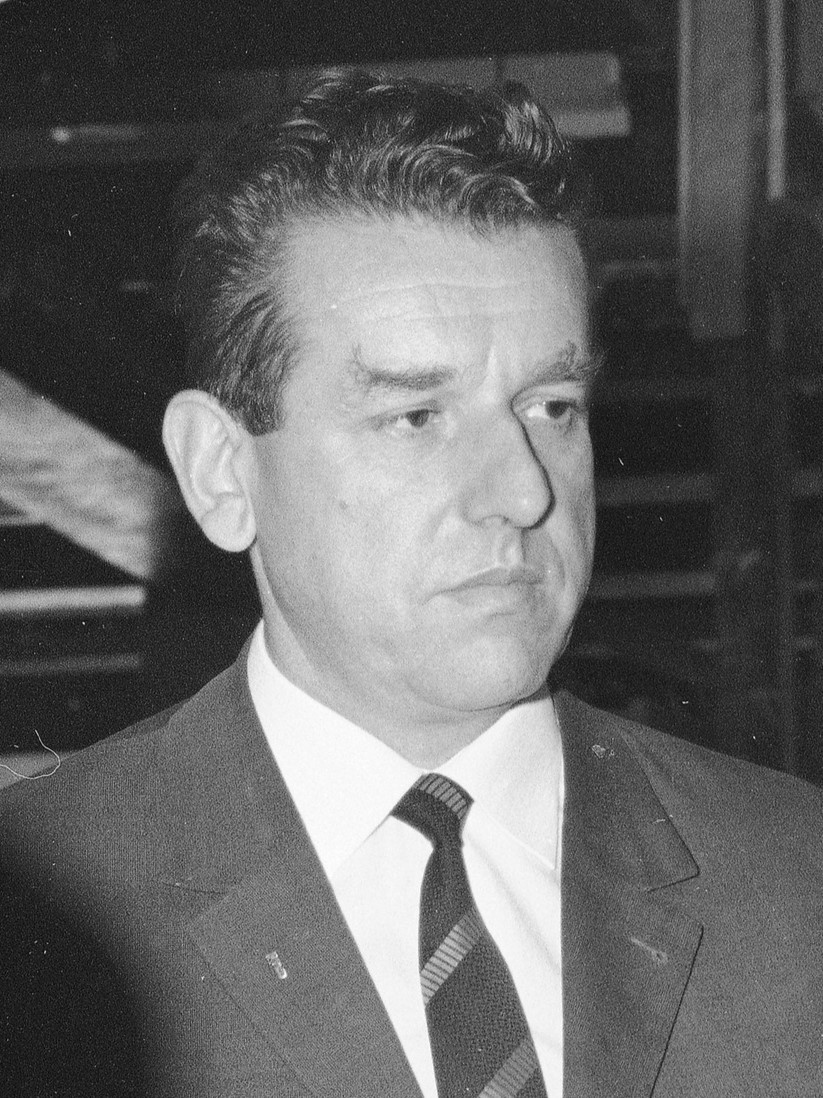

Mayor of Warsaw
- In office 29 December 1967 – 18 February 1982
- Preceded by: Janusz Zarzycki
- Succeeded by: Mieczysław Dębicki

Deputy to the Sejm
- In office 1969–1976

Personal details
- Born: 18 December 1925 Potworów, Congress Poland
- Died: 24 April 2019 (aged 93) Konstancin-Jeziorna, Poland
- Resting place: Powązki Cemetery
- Party: PZPR
- Education: Warsaw University of Technology

Jerzy Tadeusz Majewski (born December 18, 1925 in Potworów, died April 24, 2019 in Konstancin-Jeziorna) was a Polish engineer and politician, member of the Sejm of the Polish People's Republic in the 5th and 6th terms, chairman of the presidium of the National Council of the Capital City of Warsaw (1967–1973), and mayor of Warsaw from 1973–1982.

== Biography ==
The son of Edward and Janina Majewski. From 1943 to 1945, he was a member of the underground organization Grey Ranks Scout Assault Groups in Radom. In 1953, he graduated from the Faculty of Engineering at the Warsaw University of Technology and joined the Polish United Workers' Party. For several years, he combined his studies with professional work: from November 1948, he worked at the Municipal Construction Company as a construction manager, then as chief engineer. In December 1957, he obtained his construction license.

In March 1954, he moved to the Ministry of Municipal Economy, where he served successively as director of the Central Board of Municipal Construction, director of the Department of Housing Economy, director general of the Ministry, and from July 1964 as Undersecretary of State (Deputy Minister).

From December 29, 1967, to December 9, 1973, he served as chairman of the presidium of the National Council of the Capital City of Warsaw, and then as mayor of the Capital City of Warsaw (from December 13, 1973, to February 18, 1982). From 1969 to 1983, he served on the National Council of the Capital City of Warsaw. He also held party positions: from 1968 to 1975, he was a deputy member, and from 1975 to 1981, a member of the Central Committee of the Polish United Workers' Party. From 1969 to 1976, he served as a member of the Sejm of the Polish People's Republic during the 5th and 6th terms.

In February 1982, he returned to work at the Ministry of Construction; until January 16, 1991, he served as Undersecretary of State in the Ministry of Construction and the Building Materials Industry (from 1985, the Ministry of Construction, Spatial and Municipal Economy, and from 1987, the Ministry of Spatial Economy and Construction) and simultaneously as the government's plenipotentiary for the construction of the Warsaw Metro. He also served as vice-chairman (1971–1980) and chairman (1981–1984) of the Social Committee for the Reconstruction of the Royal Castle in Warsaw, a member of the Scientific and Consultative Council of the Warsaw Metro (from 1995), a member of the Social Committee for the Construction of the Metro, and a member of the Board of the Polish Housing Association (from 2004).

He was active in associations. On February 1, 1960, he became a member of the Polish Association of Construction Engineers and Technicians, where he held, among other positions, the position of chairman. He served as Vice-Chairman of the Main Board (1987–1993). From 1994–2008, he served on the Main Audit Committee, chairing it from 1999–2002. He also chaired the Housing Committee of the Warsaw Branch and chaired the organizing committees of the annual conferences in Spała, devoted to the construction and maintenance of residential buildings. He participated in the work of the committee for the Association's "Construction of the Year" competition. In June 2005, the 20th Congress of the Polish Association of Construction Engineers and Technicians named him an honorary member. He received the Association's gold badge (1977).

He was buried at the Powązki Cemetery in Warsaw.

== Awards ==
- Officer's Cross of the Order of Polonia Restituta (1964)
- Commander's Cross of the Order of Polonia Restituta (1974)
- Silver Cross of Merit (1955)
- Gold Cross of Merit (1958)
- Silver Badge of Honour of the Supreme Technical Organization (1964)
- Golden Honorary Badge "For Merit to Warsaw" (1966)
- Gold Badge of Honour of the Supreme Technical Organization (1969)
- Commemorative Medal "For Merits to the Warsaw Military District" (1970)
- Order of Prince Henry (Portugal, 1975)
- Medal "Four Centuries of Warsaw's Capital City" (1998)
- Badge "For Merit to Warsaw" (2000)
- Honorary citizen of Warsaw (2004)
- Order of Leopold (1977)
