= Internal Defense Forces (Poland) =

- Wojska Obrony Wewnętrznej
- Active: 1965
- Disbanded: 1989
- Country: Polish People's Republic
- Type: Paramilitary forces
- Role: Political coercion, throttling of protests, street and state security, civil defense
- Part of: Territorial Defense Forces

The Internal Defense Forces (Polish: Wojska Obrony Wewnętrznej) was one of the types of troops of the Polish People's Army.

== History ==
In 1965, on the basis of the Internal Security Corps units which were handed over from the Ministry of Internal Affairs to the Ministry of National Defence, a new type of troops was created - the Internal Defense Forces. After reorganization, they became part of the National Territorial Defense forces.

The Internal Defense Forces wore a khaki uniform of the Army and a navy blue cap rim. Hats with feathers and capes related to the regional costume of the Podhale people were received by the 5th Podhale Brigade of the Internal Defense Forces.

In 1965, the disbanding the Internal Security Corps transferred three brigades, eight motorized regiments, a tank regiment, a pontoon and bridge regiment, two engineering battalions, a communications regiment and a communications battalion to the Ministry of National Defense. On the basis of these units, four groups of units of the Internal Defense Forces were created: security for the State Defense Committee and Provincial Defense Committees (protection and communication units), land defense of the country's territory (to combat enemy landings and sabotage groups), security for the regrouping of troops (pontoon-bridge units and traffic regulation). In the event of a threat, Internal Defense Forces were also supposed to provide assistance to the Ministry of Internal Affairs bodies in maintaining public order and security. In December 1976, the Internal Defense Forces Command was dissolved, and its subordinate units were subordinated to the commanders of the Military Districts (Polish: Wojewódzki sztab wojskowy).

The Internal Defense Forces, which totaled 65,000 troops in 1982, were equipped as mechanized infantry units, including tanks. The component units, which were organized at district level, had the missions of engaging hostile troops on Polish territory and eliminating local underground elements. The units were to receive the same individual training as regular ground forces, although they did not participate in large-scale coordinated exercises.

The Internal Defense Forces existed until 1989, when they were disbanded as part of the reduction of the Polish People's Army. Some units were transformed into security regiments, some were subordinated to the commander of the Vistula Military Units.

== Organization and structure ==
The Internal Defense Forces of the Territorial Defense Forces were divided into the following units:

- Security units of the State Defense Committee (Polish: Jednostki zabezpieczenia Komitetu Obrony Kraju) - three brigades and two regiments of Internal Defense Forces., one regiment and four communications battalions
- Security units of the Voivodeship Defense Committees (Polish: Jednostki zabezpieczenia Wojewódzkich Komitetów Obrony) - sixteen communications companies
- Land defense units (Polish: Jednostki obrony lądowej) – four Internal Defense Forces regiments. (developed into brigades during the war)
- Defense units against weapons of mass destruction (Polish: Jednostki obrony przed bronią masowego rażenia) - three Internal Defense Forces engineering battalions.
- Units securing the regrouping of the army (Polish: Jednostki zabezpieczenia przegrupowania wojska) - three regiments and two pontoon battalions of Internal Defense Forces.

=== Units ===
Security units of the State Defense Committee and voivodeship defense committees

- 1st Mazowiecka WOW Brigade in Góra Kalwaria (subordinated to the NJW MSW from January 1, 1992)
- 2nd Podlaska WOW Brigade in Białystok
- 5th Podhale Brigade of the Krakow Land WOW in Krakow
- 8th WOW Regiment (JW 1503) in Łódź, 22 Lipca Street (6 Sierpnia street) 86
- 14th Masurian WOW Regiment – later 14th WOW Brigade (JW 2839) in Olsztyn, ul. Wincenty Pstrowski (subordinated to the NJW MSW from January 1, 1992, as the 14th Security Regiment)
- 20th Communications Brigade of the Kielce Region (JW 3417) - Kielce (subordinated to the NJW MSW from January 1, 1992)
- 2nd Podlaski Signal Regiment in Białystok
- WOW Management Positions Security Branch (subordinated to the NJW of the Ministry of Internal Affairs from January 1, 1992)
- 112th Security Battalion (JW 1076) Linin (subordinated to the NJW of the Ministry of Internal Affairs from January 1, 1992)
- Land defense units:
- 3rd Lublin Regiment WOW in Lublin
- 10th Greater Poland Regiment WOW (JW 3443) in Poznań, Grunwaldzka 9 str.
- 13 Kashubian Regiment WOW (JW 3455) in Gdańsk, 1 Łąkowa str.
- 15th WOW Regiment in Prudnik.

== Commanders ==
- Wacław Czyżewski (1970-1974)
