= Janusz Zarzycki =

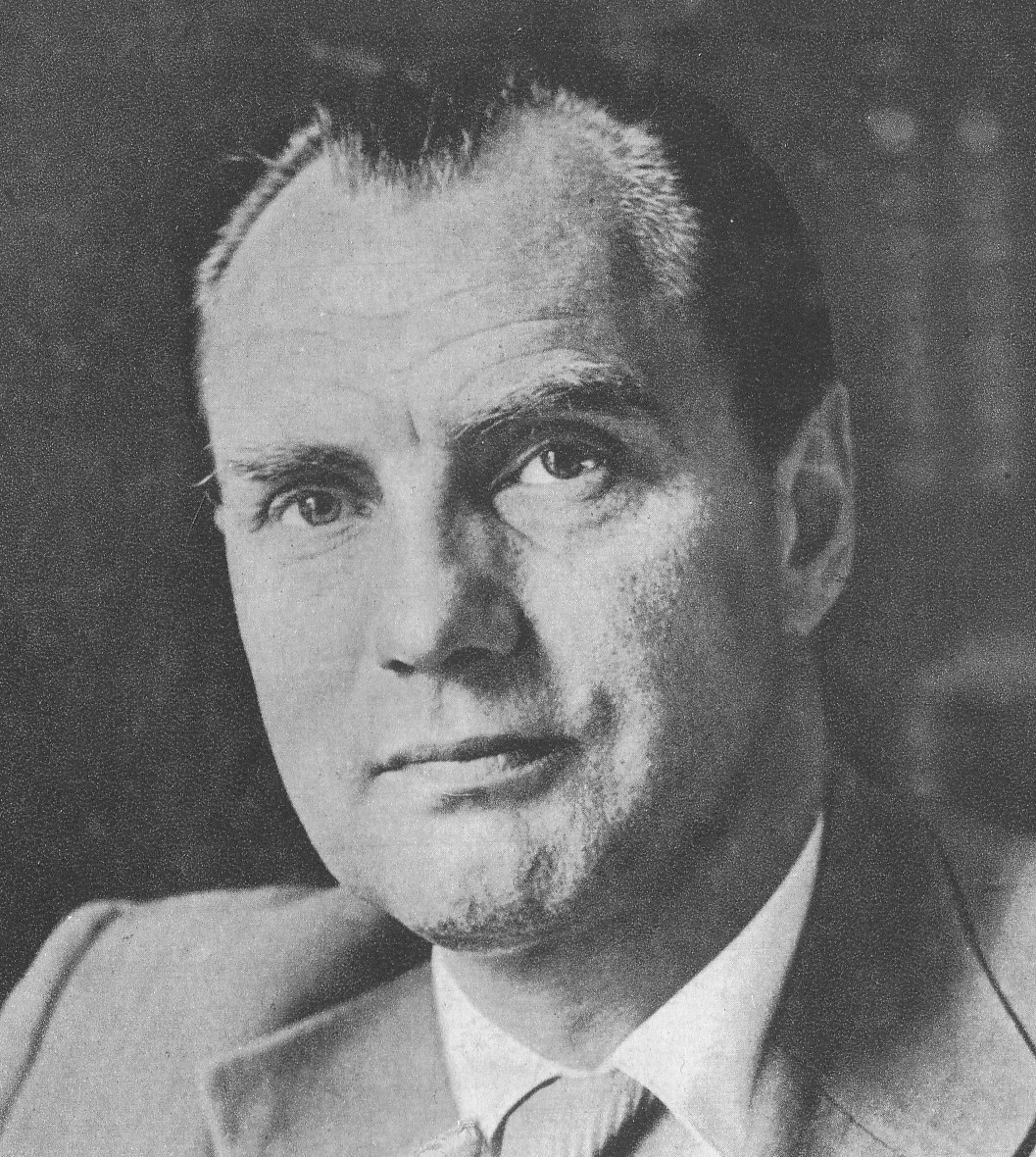

Mayor of Warsaw
- In office 15 May 1956 – 17 December 1956
- Preceded by: Jerzy Albrecht
- Succeeded by: Zygmunt Dworakowski
- In office 5 May 1960 – 29 December 1967
- Preceded by: Zygmunt Dworakowski
- Succeeded by: Jerzy Majewski

Member of the Sejm
- In office 1957–1969

Personal details
- Born: 15 April 1914 Pruszków, Congress Poland
- Died: 15 February 1995 (aged 80) Warsaw, Poland
- Resting place: Powązki Military Cemetery
- Party: PZPR
- Education: Warsaw University of Technology

Military service
- Branch/service: Polish Army; Polish People's Army
- Rank: Divisional general
- Unit: 28th Heavy Artillery Divizion

Janusz Zarzycki, aka Wojtek (born April 15, 1914 in Pruszków, died February 15, 1995 in Warsaw) was a Polish architect and communist politician, Major General of the Polish People's Army who served in various positions in the Polish People's Republic such as head of the Main Political Board of the Polish Army, chairman of the Union of Youth Struggle and the Union of Polish Youth, president of the Society of Fighters for Freedom and Democracy, chairman of the presidium of the Warsaw City National Council, deputy minister of national defense, and member of the Sejm of the Polish People's Republic Second, Third, and Fourth term. He received the title Righteous Among the Nations.

== Biography ==
Born under the surname Neugebauer, he was the son of Edmund and Jadwiga. In 1932, he graduated from Tadeusz Czacki High School in Warsaw and studied at the Warsaw University of Technology until 1935. During his studies, he was a member of the Union of Polish Democratic Youth.

In 1937–1938, he graduated from the Masovian School of Artillery Reserve Cadets in Zambrów and worked as a tutor at a workers' club in Warsaw. He participated in the 1939 Defensive War as part of the 28th Heavy Artillery Divizion. From 1939–1941, he was a student at the Lviv Polytechnic Institute, also working as a construction technician on the construction of the Lviv Theater from 1940. In 1941, he returned to Warsaw. Until 1942, he worked as a construction technician at the Social Construction Company in Warsaw. That same year, he became a soldier in the Union of Liberation Struggle and a member of the Polish Workers' Party, as well as a staff officer in the People's Guard, where he headed the training department. In 1943, he was arrested and imprisoned in German camps (Auschwitz-Birkenau and Buchenwald) until 1945.

After World War II, he was associated with the Polish People's Army. From 1945 to 1947, he was an officer in the Main Political Board of the Polish Army, and from 1956 to 1960, he headed the Main Political and Educational Board of the Polish Army and the Main Political Board of the Polish Army. In 1949, he was a delegate of the National Council of Defenders of Peace to the Congress of Defenders of Peace in Paris. From 1949 to 1956, he served as president of the Central Office for Vocational Training.

From 1947 to 1948, he was chairman of the Main Board of the Union of Youth Struggle and a deputy member of the Central Committee of the Polish Workers' Party (PPR), with which he joined the Polish United Workers' Party. Together with the ZWM, he co-founded the Union of Polish Youth, whose Main Board he chaired until 1949. In the years 1948–1954 and 1959–1964, he was a member of the Central Committee of the Polish United Workers' Party (PZPR). From 1948 to 1954, he also served on the Organizational Bureau of the PPR and the PZPR, respectively, and from 1954 to 1959 on the Central Audit Commission of the PZPR. He was a delegate to the first four congresses of this party. In the 1950s, he was associated with the Puławy faction. From 1956 to 1960, he served as Deputy Minister of National Defense. From 14 May 1956 to 17 December 1956 and from 5 May 1960 to 29 December 1967, he was chairman of the presidium of the Municipal National Council of the Capital City of Warsaw (de-facto Mayor of Warsaw). From 1957 to 1969, he was a member of the Sejm of the Polish People's Republic of the Second, Third, and Fourth terms. From 1956 to 1964, he served as President of the Main Board of the Union of Fighters for Freedom and Democracy. At subsequent congresses (1969, 1974, 1979, and 1985), he was elected to the Supreme Council of the Union of Fighters for Freedom and Democracy. He also served on the National Committee of the Front of National Unity. After 1967, he served as Director of the Institute of Urban Planning and Architecture in Warsaw. From 1987, he was a member of the Citizens' Consultative Convention under the chairman of the National Council of the Capital City of Warsaw.

In 1988, for his selfless assistance in 1942 to two escapees from the ghetto, Mosze Wasserman and Stanisław Sierpiński, he was awarded the title of Righteous Among the Nations by Yad Vashem. He was buried with his wife at the Powązki Military Cemetery in Warsaw.

== Awards ==
- Order of the Banner of Labour, 1st Class (1964)
- Commander's Cross of the Order of Polonia Restituta
- Order of the Cross of Grunwald, 3rd Class (1945)
- Silver Cross of the Order of Virtuti Militari (December 19, 1945)
- Partisan Cross (1946)
- Auschwitz Cross (1985)
- Medal for Warsaw 1939–1945 (January 17, 1946)
- Medal "For Participation in Fighting in Defense of People's Power" (1986)
- Bronze Medal of the Armed Forces in the Service of the Fatherland (1957)
- Medal of the 10th Anniversary of People's Poland
- Badge of the 1000th Anniversary of the Polish State (1966)
- Golden Badge of the Union of Volunteer Fire Departments (1965)
- Golden Badge of Honour of the Polish Teachers' Union (PTTK) (1960)
- Golden Trade Union Badge of Honour of the Polish Teachers' Union (1955)
- Golden Badge of Honour "For Merit to Warsaw" (1964)
- Cross of the Military Order of the White Lion (Czechoslovakia) (1949)
- Order of the National Flag, 1st Class (DPRK, 1954)
- National Order of Merit (France, 1967)
- Commander's Cross of the Order of Merit of the Italian Republic (1967)
- Commemorative Medal of the City of Skopje for Assistance in the Reconstruction of the City (1967)
- Righteous Among the Nations Medal (1988)
