= Ludmiłówka pogrom =

- Location: Ludmiłówka, Poland
- Date: November 1942 – February 1943
- Target: Polish Jews
- Motive: Blood libel

Ludmiłówka Pogrom (November 1942 – February 1943) was an alleged pogrom against the Jewish community and Jewish members of the Gwardia Ludowa in and around the village of Ludmiłówka in Kraśnik County, Lublin Voivodeship, perpetrated by communist partisans from the Gwardia Ludowa, under the command of Grzegorz Korczyński (codename "Grzegorz"). According to some historians, the crime was a robbery of Jews in hiding, escapees from nearby ghettos, and former Polish soldiers of Jewish origin who had fought in the Invasion of Poland. For the Jewish faction in the Gwardia Ludowa, these killings were a form of internal power struggle within the Polish Workers' Party. A total of approximately 100 Jews hiding in the area, mostly women and children, were allegedly murdered. These historians cite testimony from Korczyński's Stalinist political trial in their works. He himself was acquitted in the de-Stalinization section, and the Supreme Court found his trial to be biased. Some of those who had previously accused Korczyński claimed that his confessions were coerced through beatings

== Alleged course of events ==
Korczyński arrived in the Kraśnik area in the second half of August 1942 and immediately joined the structures of Polish Workers' Party and Gwardia Ludowa there. He quickly built his own unit based on the robbery gang of Antoni Paleń "Jastrzębie". His close associates included Edward Gronczewski "Przepiórka" and Jan Wziętek "Murzyn". According to information from the aforementioned trial, one of their first armed actions was a raid on a nearby Polish estate, its robbery, and the rape of the owner. Later, minor sabotage actions by "Grzegorz" and other communist groups prompted a pacification operation by the German occupiers, in which several hundred people were killed. A scattered Jewish community of 100-150 people hid in the villages of Ludmiłówka, Grabówka, and their surrounding areas, and Korczyński's guards allegedly focused their attention on them.

According to the same sources, the first Jewish victim of "Grzegorz's" unit was Jankiel Skrzyl "Kaczor," a member of the Gwardia Ludowa, who was led out of the village into the forest and killed by blows to the head with a wooden stake. Over the next few weeks, five more Jews were killed – three men and two women. Shortly thereafter, a group of approximately 30 escapees from a camp for Polish Jewish prisoners of war in Lublin approached Korczyński. These were Polish soldiers from the September Campaign who wanted to join the fight against the Germans in the ranks of the communists. They were also allegedly murdered by "Grzegorz's" group, as also reported by individuals who testified as part of the political investigation.

Korczyński's armed actions had little military significance (the attack on the post office, the killing of a miller, the murder of a German family), but resulted in German retaliation and manhunts, which reduced the chances of survival for the Jewish escapees. This also aroused resentment among some members of the Gwardia Ludowa, who, under the leadership of the district secretary of the Polish Workers' Party, Jan Gruchalski "Sokół," allegedly formed an opposition. The attack by "Grzegorz's" unit on the Janiszów Jewish camp was successful. A German guard was killed, and the camp treasury, containing money and valuables previously seized from prisoners, was seized. A group of 30-40 young Jews, who were intended to be used in communist partisan movements, was also released.

Upon returning to Ludmiłówka, according to trial materials, Korczyński allegedly demanded a massive ransom of 600,000 złoty from the Jews hiding in the village and surrounding area (claiming he needed this sum to purchase weapons for the partisans). He then left, taking some of the loot and ordering the guards left behind to "collect" the designated sum. They allegedly began looting the hiding Jews, and several more Jews were murdered. The situation escalated when the young niece of one of Korczyński's partisans appeared in Ludmiłówka dressed as a missing Jewish girl, and Stefan Staręgowski "Stefan" (one of "Grzegorz's" closest associates) proposed a plan to get rid of Jews at a meeting of the local PPR committee as "posing a threat." The opposition, the "Gruchalszczyki," decided to intervene. Taking advantage of the leader's absence, his headquarters in Grabówka was allegedly attacked. The Płowaś brothers (Jan "Lube" and Edward "Lutek") and "Stefan" were killed, their radio station was destroyed, and valuables looted from Janiszów and nearby Jews were taken. A meeting of the PPR committee was held at Feliksa Wyganowska's home, where the clothing, personal belongings, and valuables of the murdered Jews were presented. The committee approved Gruchalski's actions against Grzegorz's staff and allegedly issued a death sentence against Korczyński himself. This information also comes from trial sources.

According to the cited sources, upon returning to Ludmiłówka on December 6th, Korczyński allegedly began a bloody revenge. Captured opponents were executed on the spot. The "purge" affected not only communists involved in internal fighting within the Gwardia Ludowa. Jews hiding in the area were allegedly treated as supporting the opposition and were mercilessly murdered as such. Edward Gronczewski allegedly distinguished himself for his brutality, after shooting Perła Flam (Perła Żurek) by inserting a stick into her genitals. In total, approximately 100 Jews were murdered using firearms, grenades, sticks, tools found at the scene, or even with his bare hands. Jan Gruchalski was captured in February 1943. A "party court" was held, after which the "judges," dissatisfied with the accused's response, beat him, and Korczyński ordered his execution. Jan Pachuta allegedly decapitated him with a few blows of his saber, ending this phase of the internal PPR-Gwardia Ludowa.

== Korczyński's trial ==
Grzegorz Korczyński was arrested on May 21, 1950, by Józef Światło, Lieutenant Colonel of the Ministry of Public Security, with the intention of using him in the upcoming trial of Władysław Gomułka, who had previously granted him impunity. When this failed, the Ludmiłówka case, the murders of Jews committed during the German occupation, was brought up. On May 22, 1954, Korczyński was sentenced to life imprisonment, which was commuted to 15 years by the Supreme Court on December 24, 1954. Andrzej Flis "Maksym," Edward Gronczewski, and many others of his subordinates at the time were also sentenced to prison, for example, "Przepiórka" received an 8-year sentence.

== Korczyński's acquittal and exoneration of pogrom charges ==
After Gomułka came to power, Korczyński's subordinates who had incriminated him recanted their testimony, claiming they had been beaten, which resulted in the annulment of their convictions or dismissal of their cases. Korczyński himself was released in April 1956, moved to Warsaw, and became a close associate of Gomułka. The Supreme Court deemed the trial unfair, and he himself was rehabilitated by the court.

== Controversy ==
Some historians claim that the pogrom never took place. Ryszard Nazarewicz denies Korczyński's murders. He believes that his accusation was based on fabricated materials, mainly by Józef Światło, prepared for the trial of Władysław Gomułka and other activists between 1949 and 1955 in the 10th Department of the Ministry of Public Security. He claims that the murders of Jews concerned the liquidation of a group composed of Poles and Jews known as the "Grochalski gang", which in late 1942 murdered several members of the staff of the Kościuszko Operational Group in the Kraśnik region and robbed, among other things, the group's treasury. Korczyński himself allegedly dragged his wife's parents out of the ghetto and hid them with his own family during the occupation, and during the war had several dozen Jewish partisans in his entourage. Furthermore, this Gwardia Ludowa officer is said to have freed approximately 350 Jews from an SS camp in the Lublin region. Nazarewicz also stated that information regarding Korczyński's pogroms are "slanders" intended to discredit the Gwardia Ludowa. The author also argued that the investigation materials used by right-wing historians were fabricated by the Ministry of Public Security. This claim is disputed by, among others, Joanna Tokarska-Bakir from the Jewish Historical Institute.

The same historian reported that, according to information gathered after de-Stalinization by the ruling party, the General Prosecutor's Office, and the Provincial Court in Warsaw, Korczyński was accused of committing non-existent crimes or crimes committed by the National Armed Forces and other perpetrators. Furthermore, no documents in favor of the commander were included in the case files. This included the testimony of Jewish partisans who were under Korczyński's command until the end of the war (including 35 from the Ludmiłówka area).

== According to NSZ Commanders ==
National Armed Forces Commanders Leonard Zub-Zdanowicz and Kazimierz Wybranowski claimed that Jewish groups operating in the service of the Gestapo operated in the Kraśnik area. They allegedly aimed to disrupt the activities of underground organizations, including the Gwardia Ludowa and National Armed Forces. In connection with this, the Nationalists allegedly murdered six alleged Jewish agents. Dariusz Libionka cited a source suggesting that information about Jewish espionage was leaked by the Home Army..
