= Bolesław Kieniewicz =

Polish and Soviet General

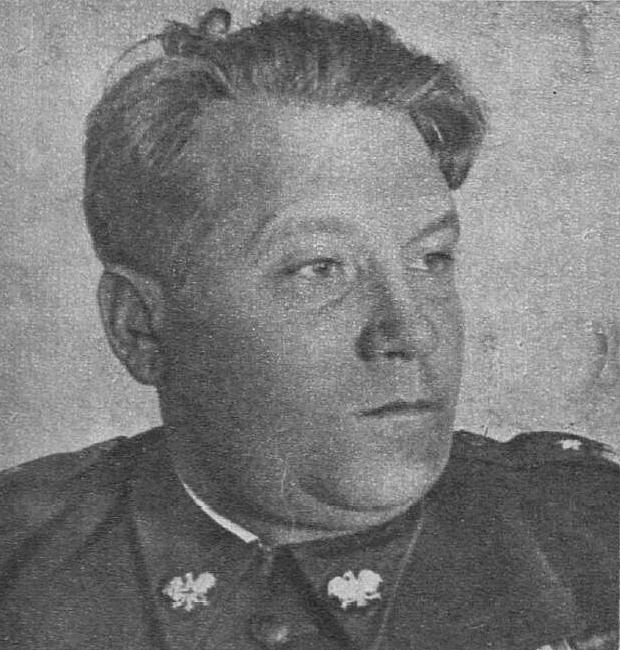
- Born: Болеслав Альбинович Кеневич; November 21, 1907; Dvorets village, Pinsky Uyezd, Minsk Governorate, Russian Empire (now Belarus)
- Died: May 3, 1969 (aged 61); Warsaw, Poland
- Military career
- Allegiance: Soviet Union; Polish People's Republic
- Branch: Red Army/Soviet Army (1921-1923, 1923-1943, 1946-1950, 1954-1956); Polish People's Army (1943-1946, 1950-1954)
- Service years: 1920–1956
- Rank: Lieutenant General (USSR); Major General (Poland)
- Conflicts: Russian Civil War; World War II
- Awards

Bolesław Kieniewicz (Russian: Болеслав Альбинович Кеневич; 21 November 1907 – 3 May 1969) was a Red Army Lieutenant general who served in the Polish People's Army during World War II and in post-war commanded the Internal Security Corps in the Polish People's Republic.

== Early life ==
Kieniewicz was born in 1907 in the village of Dvorets in Minsk Governorate, to a family of Polish nobility. During the October Revolution of 1917, Kieniewicz's parents were murdered and the family property was devastated. In the aftermath of the revolution, Kieniewicz and his sisters found themselves in Russian SFSR, where he went to an orphanage while his sisters moved to Saratov and Solovetsky Islands.

== Military career ==
At the end of the seventh grade of school in 1921, he voluntarily entered into the Red Army and worked as a courier for the supply department of the North Caucasian Military District. In 1923, he left from the army and worked at a construction site in Saratov.

In May 1926, Kieniewicz re-entered in the Red Army and was sent to study at the 12th Twice Red Banner Infantry School for Command Staff named after V. I. Lenin in Ulyanovsk. After graduating in September 1929, he served in the 81st Infantry Division and later was appointed as platoon commander of the 241st Rifle Regiment in Kozelsk in January 1931. From April 1932, he served as company commander of the 242nd Rifle Regiment in Kaluga and head of the regimental school of 241st Rifle Regiment from April 1934 and commanded battalions in the rifle regiments of the division.

During the Great Purge, Kieniewicz did not hide his Polish origins and also to a certain extent emphasized his origin. In this regard, he was subjected to repression in 1937 and was eventually released in 1939.

=== World War II ===
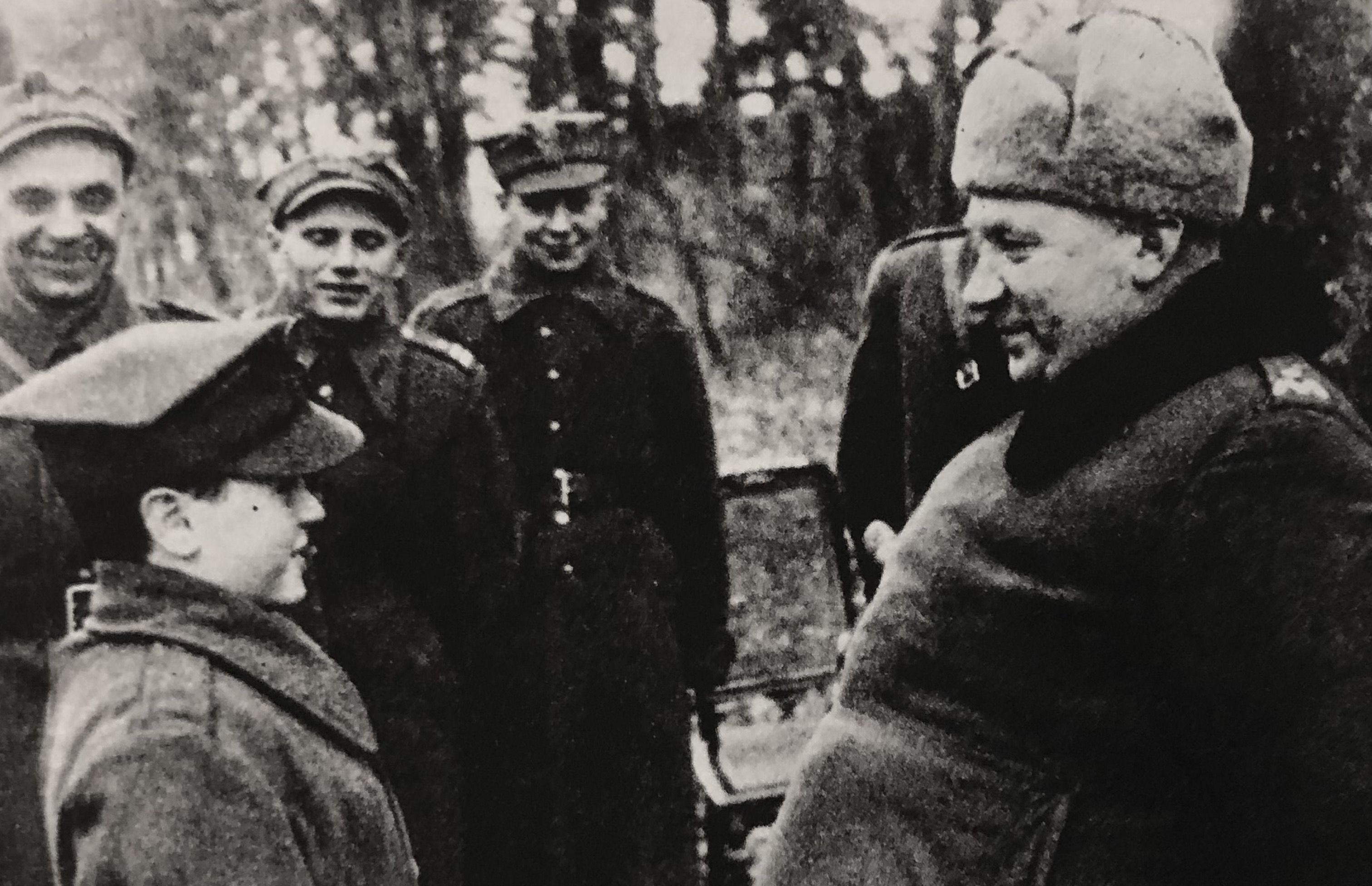
Kieniewicz (right) in a conversation with the 'son of the regiment'

During the Soviet invasion of Poland in September 1939, which was followed in the aftermath of the German invasion of Poland, Kieniewicz served as battalion commander of the 49th Infantry Regiment of 50th Infantry Division. In 1940, he took part in the Winter War. For military distinctions shown in these campaigns, he was awarded the Order of the Red Banner.

In September 1940, he was appointed chief of staff of the 57th Motorized Rifle Regiment of the 57th Tank Division, which was stationed in the Mongolian People's Republic. In May 1941, the division was assigned within the 5th Mechanized Corps of the 16th Army, where it was stationed at the Kiev Special Military District.

Following the outbreak of Operation Barbarossa in June 1941, Kieniewicz's regiment took part in the battles near Shepetivka and later was transferred to the Western Front in the 19th Army. He was transferred to the 20th Army and participated in the Battle of Smolensk. From 9 July 1941, he fought near Krasny with the 29th Rifle Regiment and on July 20, the regiment retreated beyond the Dnieper, and on 1 September 1941, it was disbanded.

From September 1941, he served as deputy commander of the 30th Guards Rifle Regiment of the 7th Guards Rifle Division, and from November, he was appointed commander of the 14th Guards Rifle Regiment of the same division. Kieniewicz was appointed commander of the 397th Infantry Division. In January 1943, he was wounded and sent to the hospital for treatment.

After his recovery in May 1943, he was transferred to the Ludowe Wojsko Polskie (Polish People's Army) as one of the many Soviet officers who were to ensure that this allied formation remained loyal to communist ideals. Within this military formation, he was appointed as deputy commander of the 1st Tadeusz Kościuszko Infantry Division and took part in the Battle of Lenino.

From December 1943 to 1 April 1944, he served as chief of staff of the 1st Polish Corps. After the transformation of the corps into the First Polish Army, he was assigned as the chief of staff of the unit. On March 13, 1944, Kieniewicz was awarded the military rank of Major general.

On May 27, 1944, Kieniewicz was appointed commander of the 4th Pomeranian Infantry Division and commanded it until the end of World War II. On 12 November 1944, he was awarded the military rank of Brigadier general in the Polish People's Army. On September 14, 1944, he was appointed commander of the Warsaw-Praga garrison. In this position, he issued strict orders to disarm the Polish Home Army and other anti-communist underground organizations. He fought in the First Polish Army in the breakthrough of the Pommernstellung (Pomerania Wall) fortification line. For his successful operations, he was noted five times in the orders of the Supreme Commander-in-Chief Joseph Stalin.

=== Post war ===
After the end of the war in May 1945, he became the commander of the Internal Security Corps of the Ministry of Public Security, where he took part in implementing the communist regime in Poland by suppressing the anti-communist resistance. He held this position until 30 November 1946. On 25 May 1945, he was promoted to Major general. From March 1946, he was a member of the Polish State Security Committee.

On 30 November 1946, Kieniewicz was dismissed from the Polish People's Army by Marshal of the Soviet Union (later Marshal of Poland) Konstantin Rokossovsky for corruption, after it was discovered that Kieniewicz owned a private villa in Mokotów. In early 1947, he returned to USSR, where he was a student at the K. Е. Voroshilov Higher Military Academy in Moscow. After graduating in March 1948, he was reassigned to the Soviet Army, where he served as deputy commander of an infantry corps from March 1948 to September 1949 and deputy commander of a mechanized infantry from September 1949 to February 1950.

In February 1950, at the request of Marshal Rokossovsky, Kieniewicz was reassigned to the Polish People's Army, where he was appointed as commander of the Kraków Military District on 7 May 1950. He held this position till 8 January 1954. In February 1954, he returned to USSR and reassigned to the ranks of the Soviet Army. He left from military service in 1956. Officially it was claimed that he returned to USSR due to poor health. In fact, he was reprimanded by Marshal Rokossovsky allegedly after Kieniewicz neglected in improving the living residences of soldiers and the military economy.

== Later life ==
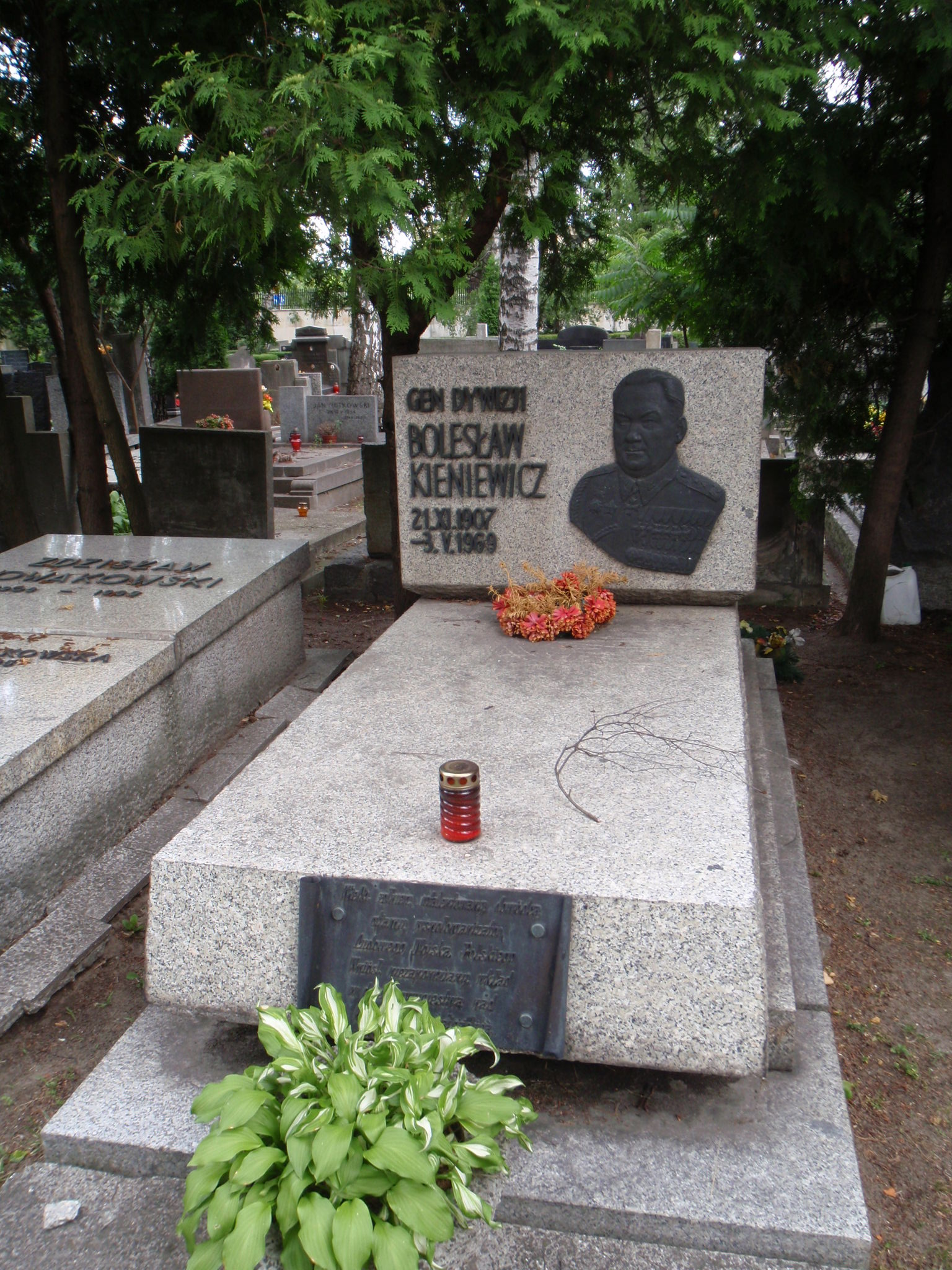
Kieniewicz's tomb at the Powązki Military Cemetery

While recovering from his injuries in 1943, Kieniewicz met captain of the medical service Lidia Alexandrovna Golubeva (1903-1990), with whom he later married. They had three children: a son and two daughters.

After his demobilisation from the Soviet Army, Kieniewicz settled in Warsaw, at his request. He died on 3 May 1969, at the age of 61, and was buried at the Powązki Military Cemetery in Warsaw. His funeral was attended by a delegation of the Polish Armed Forces led by Deputy Minister of National Defense, Major Gen. Józef Urbanowicz.

== Awards and decorations ==
- Polish People's Republic:
  - Knight's Cross of the Virtuti Militari (1945)
  - Commander's Cross of the Order of Polonia Restituta (1945)
  - Order of the Cross of Grunwald (2nd class) (1946)
  - Order of the Cross of Grunwald (3rd class) (1945)
  - Cross of Valour (11 May 1945)
  - Gold Cross of Merit, thrice (16 July 1946, 11 September 1946, 1948)
  - Medal for Merit in the Field of Glory (1st class), twice
  - Medal for Merit in the Field of Glory (2nd class)
  - Medal of the Armed Forces in the Service of the Fatherland (bronze medal)
  - Medal of Merit for National Defence (silver medal)
  - Medal of the 10th Anniversary of People's Poland
  - Medal "For Oder, Neisse and the Baltic"
  - Medal "For Warsaw 1939-1945"
  - Medal "For Participation in the Battles for Berlin"
  - Medal of Victory and Freedom 1945
- Soviet Union:
  - Order of Lenin (1951)
  - Order of the Red Banner, five times (1940, 5 March 1945, 29 June 1945, 1946, 1956)
  - Order of Suvorov, 2nd class (29 May 1945)
  - Order of the Patriotic War, 1st class (1943)
  - Order of the Red Star (3 November 1944)
  - Medal "For the Defence of Moscow" (1944)
  - Medal "For the Liberation of Warsaw" (1945)
  - Medal "For the Capture of Berlin" (1945)
  - Medal "For the Victory over Germany in the Great Patriotic War 1941–1945" (1945)
  - Jubilee Medal "Twenty Years of Victory in the Great Patriotic War 1941-1945" (1965)
  - Jubilee Medal "30 Years of the Soviet Army and Navy" (1948)
  - Jubilee Medal "50 Years of the Armed Forces of the USSR" (1968)
  - Medal "In Commemoration of the 800th Anniversary of Moscow" (1947)
