= Zygmunt Dworakowski =

Polish politician (1905–1971)

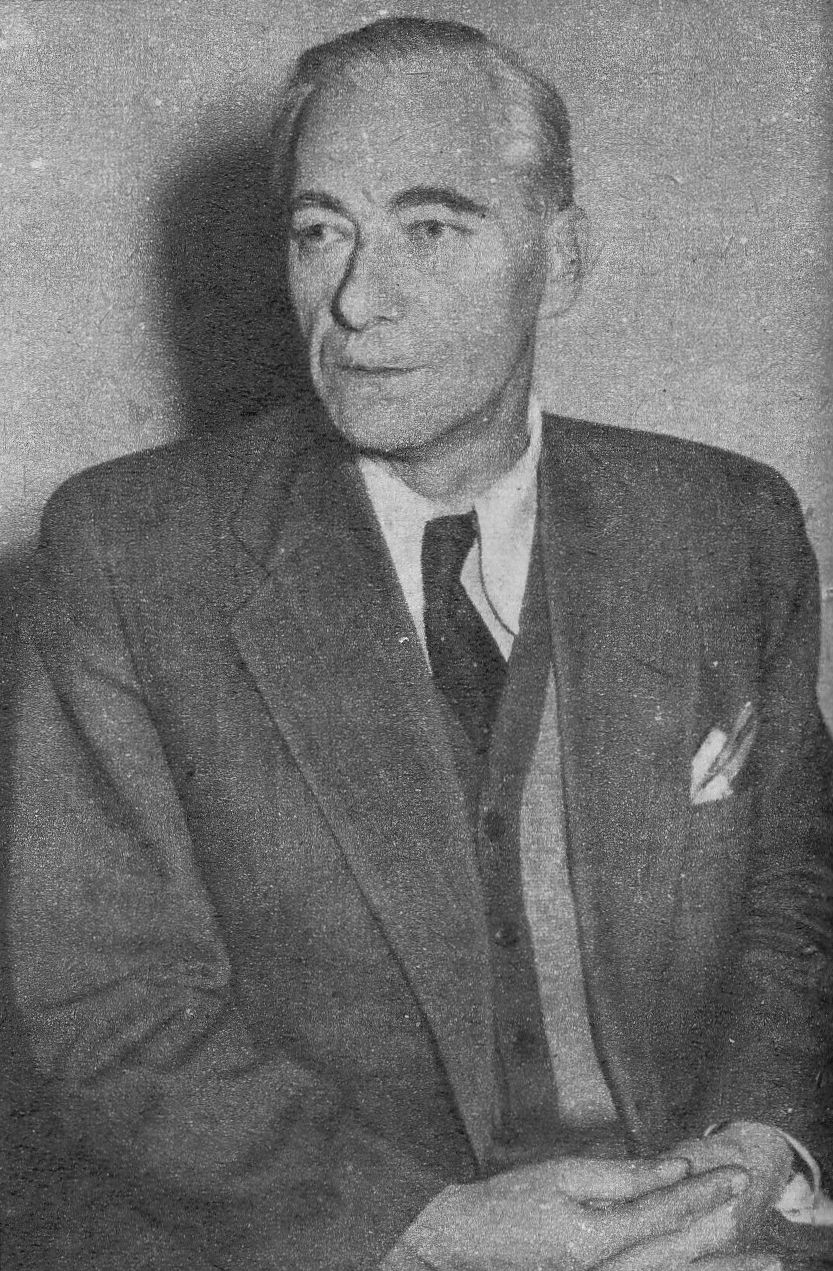

Mayor of Warsaw
- In office 17 December 1956 – 5 May 1960
- Preceded by: Janusz Zarzycki
- Succeeded by: Janusz Zarzyck

Personal details
- Born: 11 March 1905 Warsaw, Congress Poland
- Died: 9 August 1971 (aged 66) Warsaw, Polish People's Republic
- Resting place: Powązki Military Cemetery
- Party: PZPR
- Education: University of Warsaw

Zygmunt Dworakowski (born March 11, 1905, in Warsaw, died August 9, 1971, there) was a teacher, politician, local government activist, and diplomat.

== Biography ==
Son of Roman, he graduated of the University of Warsaw. He worked as a teacher, including from 1932 to 1935 as a Polish language teacher at the Władysław Giżycki Gymnasium. During World War II, he taught clandestine classes. From 1945, he was the principal of the Central School for After-School Managers.

From 1946, he was a Warsaw councilor and chairman of the Cultural Committee of the Warsaw City Council. From 1947, he worked on the City Council. From 1950, he served as vice-chairman, and from December 17, 1956, to May 5, 1960, chairman of the presidium of the National Council of the Capital City of Warsaw.

From 1960 to 1966, he served as the Polish People's Republic's ambassador to Greece and Cyprus, and later as vice president of the Society for Communication with Polish Diaspora Abroad.

He was a member of the Polish United Workers' Party.

He was buried at the Powązki Military Cemetery (section A32-1-19).

== Awards ==
- Order of the Banner of Labour, 1st Class (1959)
- Knight's Cross of the Order of Polonia Restituta (1954)
- Medal of the 10th Anniversary of People's Poland (1955)
- Badge of Honour "For Merit to Warsaw" (1960)
