= Pykulovychi =

Rural locality in Lviv Oblast, Ukraine

- Rural locality
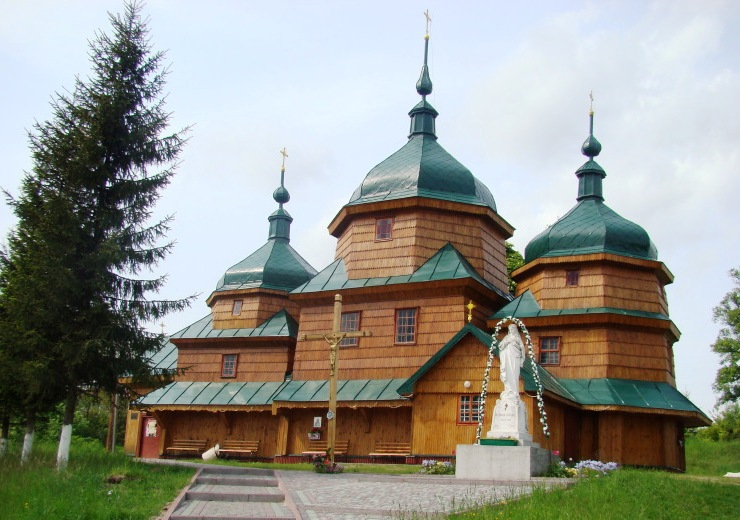
- Wooden church of the Holy Mother of God

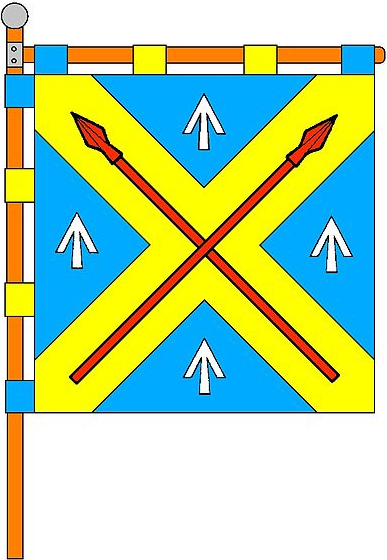
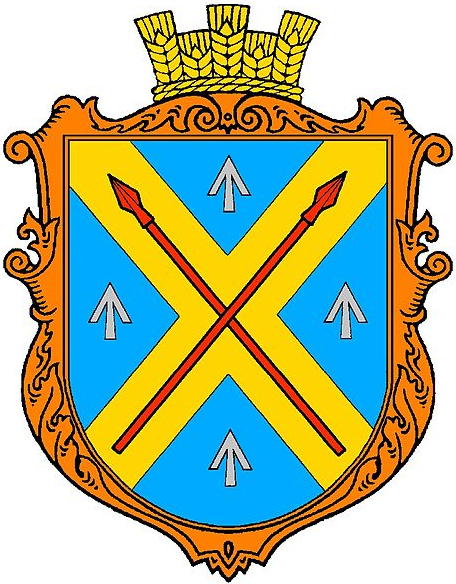
- Flag Coat of arms

- Location within Lviv Oblast Location within Ukraine
- Coordinates: 49°52′0″N 24°14′21″E
- Country: Ukraine
- Oblast: Lviv Oblast
- Raion: Lviv Raion

Area
  - Total: 3.73 km^{2} (1.44 sq mi)

Population
  - Total: 1,624
  - Density: 435.39/km^{2} (1,127.7/sq mi)

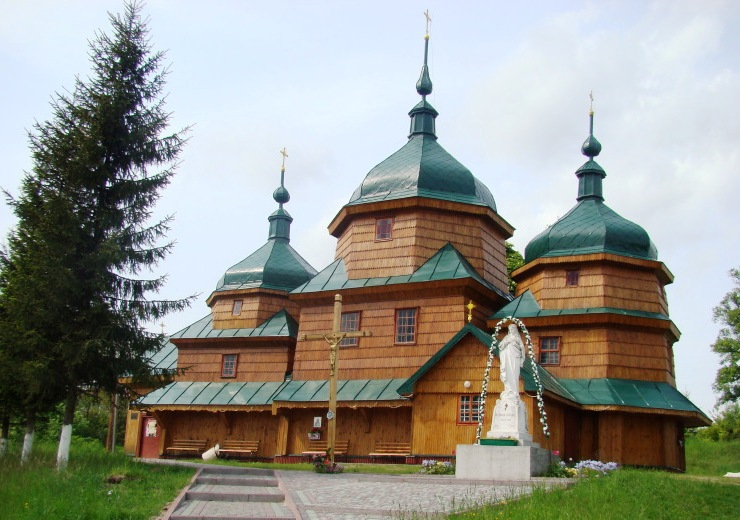
The Saint Mary Church

Pykulovychi (Ukrainian: Пикуловичі), also known as Pikulovychi (Ukrainian: Пікуловичі) is a rural locality (selo) in Lviv Raion of Lviv Oblast, Ukraine, located 20 kilometres (12 mi) east of the city of Lviv. It belongs to Novyi Yarychiv settlement hromada, one of the hromadas of Ukraine. When the area belonged to Poland (1918–1939) the village was also known as Pikulovitse (Polish: Pikułowice).

Pykulovychi was first mentioned in 1464. In the selo, a wooden Church of the Saint Mary survived. The church was built in 1794 in the traditions of Galician wooden architecture, with three domes, and is designated as a monument of architecture.

Until 18 July 2020, Pykulovychi belonged to Pustomyty Raion. The raion was abolished in July 2020 as part of the administrative reform of Ukraine, which reduced the number of raions of Lviv Oblast to seven. The area of Pustomyty Raion was merged into Lviv Raion.
