= State Defense Committee (Poland) =

- Komitet Obrony Kraju

Agency overview
- Formed: 18 February 1959
- Dissolved: 26 October 2002; 23 years ago
- Superseding agency: National Security Bureau
- Jurisdiction: Poland
- Headquarters: Warsaw, Poland
- Agency executive: Chairman; Secretary

State Defense Committee (Polish: Komitet Obrony Kraju; KOK) was a government organization which existed from 1959 in the Polish People's Republic and continued to exist following the demise of the communist system, until 26 October 2002 when it was dissolved.

== History ==
The process of creation of a body which would create and coordinated integrated state defense system in the Polish People's Republic began in the mid-50s. In a document dated 3 November 1955, a note was written with the handwritten signature of Prime Minister Józef Cyrankiewicz. It contained the first official information about the planned State Defense Committee. For this, a body with political and military competences was needed. The National Defense Committee was established by Resolution No. 66 of the Council of Ministers of February 18, 1959. In times of peace, the committee had the authority to coordinate and supervise the implementation of defense tasks by other state authorities on an ongoing basis, while in state of emergency the committee was empowered to take over full power which was composed of the leadership of the party and the government under the leadership of the Prime Minister. The priority task of KOK was an attempt to develop a concept of the functioning of central and local authorities during war and to synchronize the states of combat readiness of operational troops with the states of defense readiness of the state.

The committee was to consist of eleven members responsible for appropriately grouped ministries and state institutions, with specified minimum personnel necessary for their functioning. The Committee gained legal authority under the Act on the general duty to defend of November 21, 1967, which entrusted it with determining threats to state security and managing all related matters. The KOK resolution of December 7, 1981 extended the competences of provincial defense committees, thanks to which they were to be structures responsible for introducing and maintaining martial law. Despite this, with some exceptions, provincial defense committees did not play a significant role during martial law. After martial law was formally lifted, the Act of November 1983 allowed any person appointed by the Sejm (the 1st Secretary of the Central Committee of the Polish United Workers' Party) to become the chairman of the State Committee. Moreover, the chairman of the KOK gained competences in the event of a state of emergency newly introduced into the legislation, and in the event of its introduction, he would become the commander-in-chief of the state's armed forces, while the committee itself was to lead the restoration of order in the state.

Following the fall of the communist system in Poland, the National Defense Committee was subordinated to the National Security Bureau until it was formally dissolved in 2002.

== Secretaries ==
Initially, the Secretary of the State Defense Committee was ex-officio the Chief of the General Staff of the Polish People's Army. Subsequently, from 1967, the Deputy Minister of National Defense, who also held the position of Chief Inspector of Territorial Defense Forces, became the Secretary. In 1991, the position of Secretary of the State Defense Committee was assumed by the Head of the National Security Bureau.

- Lieutenant General Jerzy Bordziłowski (1959–1965)
- Major General Wojciech Jaruzelski (1965–1967)
- Lieutenant General Grzegorz Korczyński (1967–1971)
- Lieutenant General Tadeusz Tuczapski (1971–1987)
- Lieutenant General Jerzy Skalski (1987–1990)
- Major General Edmund Bołociuch (1990–1991)
- Jerzy Milewski (from February 8, 1991 to June 13, 1994)
- Henryk Goryszewski (from June 14, 1994 to December 22, 1995)
- Jerzy Milewski (from January 3, 1996 to February 10, 1997)
- Marek Siwiec (from February 19, 1997 to October 26, 2002).

The Secretary of the State Defense Committee was responsible for the Secretariat of the National Defense Committee, which provided support to the State Defense Committee. The Secretariat was headed by:

- Brig. Gen. Rudolf Dzipanow (1969–1970)
- Brig. Gen. Mieczysław Dębicki (1971–December 19, 1983)
- Brig. Gen. Leon Sulima (1983–1989)
- Brig. Gen. Zenon Poznański (1989-1990)

== See also ==
- Council of National Defense, a similar body existed during the 1920 Soviet Polish War.
- Council of Defence, a similar body existed in the Soviet Union
