= Internal Security Corps =

- Korpus Bezpieczeństwa Wewnętrznego
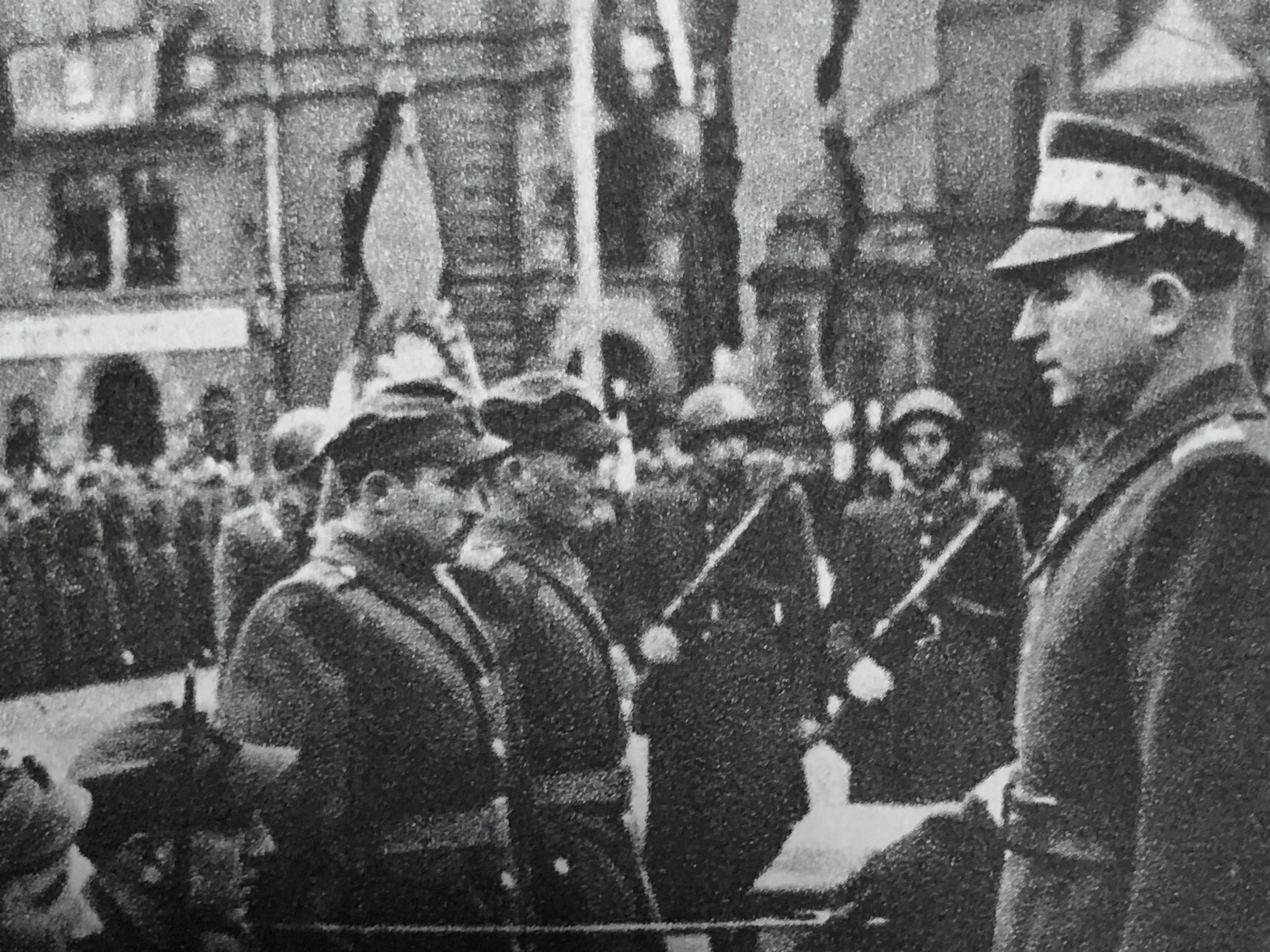
- KBW soldiers in 1947
- Active: 24 May 1945 - 1965
- Country: Poland
- Type: Armed force

The Internal Security Corps (Polish: Korpus Bezpieczeństwa Wewnętrznego, KBW) was a special-purpose paramilitary (Gendarmerie) formation in the Polish People's Republic under communist government, established on 24 May 1945. At different times subordinated to the Ministry of Internal Affairs and Ministry of National Defence, it had a similar role to the Internal Troops of the Soviet Union.

== History ==
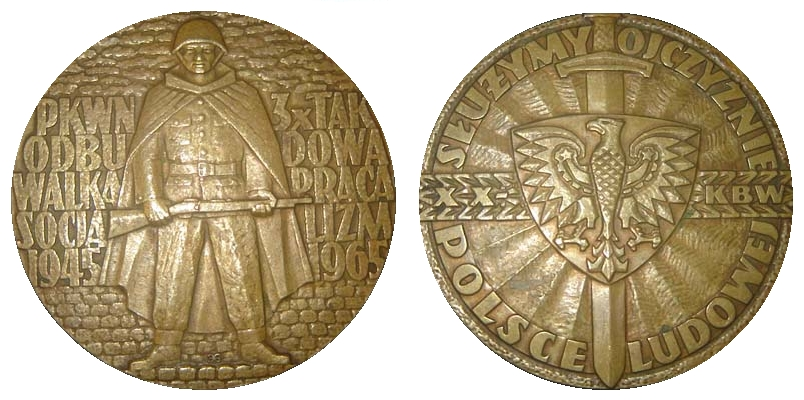
Commemorative Medal for the 20th Anniversary of the KBW

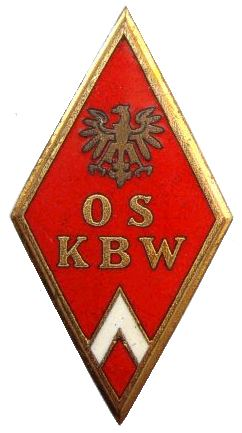
Emblem of the KBW Officer School

The creation of the Internal Security Corps (KBW) was initiated by Stanisław Radkiewicz, then secretary of the Central Bureau Communists of Poland in Moscow. In a direct conversation with Lieutenant Colonel Henryk Toruńczyk, commander of the Polish Independent Special Battalion, Radkiewicz proposed the formation of Internal Troops just before the Red Army's summer offensive in 1944.

The Corps was formally established through two resolutions issued by the Council of Ministers of Poland. The first, on March 24, 1945, called for the transformation of the Internal Troops into the Internal Security Corps. The second, on May 26, 1945, instructed the Minister of National Defense to organize the new force. Their structure was outlined in Order No. 0128, issued the following day by the Commander-in-Chief of the Polish People's Army.

On August 22, 1945, the Corps, initially formed under the Ministry of National Defence, was transferred to the Ministry of Public Security. By the end of August 1945, its force was made up of 29,053 soldiers and 2,356 officers. Later, on October 29, 1951, Order No. 062 of the Minister of Public Security subordinated the KBW to the Commander of the Internal Troops.

Beginning in 1949, the KBW assumed responsibility for protecting key economic and transport facilities. This led to a rapid increase in manpower—from 35,957 soldiers in 1950 to 40,930 by 1953. These forces were organized into 23 operational battalions and 7 companies, in addition to 17 battalions and 18 security companies.

As a result of the death of Soviet leader Joseph Stalin and the political changes that followed it, the Ministry of Public Security was abolished in December 1954, being succeeded by the Committee for Public Security and the KBW was downsized and placed under the Ministry of Internal Affairs. A February 1956 proposal by Deputy Prime Minister Franciszek Jóźwiak aimed to merge the KBW with the Border Protection Forces into a single agency under the Ministry of Internal Affairs, but this plan was never implemented. In April 1956, a decision was made to disband the KBW by November 1 of that year. However, the June 1956 Poznań protests reversed this plan, and the KBW was revitalized. Its units took part in suppressing the uprising. At the same time, there were discussions about renaming the Corps to the National Guard Corps, a nod to historical formations from the Kościuszko and November Uprisings, and an attempt to improve the agency’s reputation. While the official name remained unchanged, several territorial units adopted new derived from their geographical locations, such as the Vistula Brigade, Masovian Brigade, and Podlaskie Brigade.

In 1962, the Silesian Unit of the Engineering Army (KBW-4) was deployed to build roads in the Bieszczady County, a strategically important but sparsely populated area in southeastern Poland.

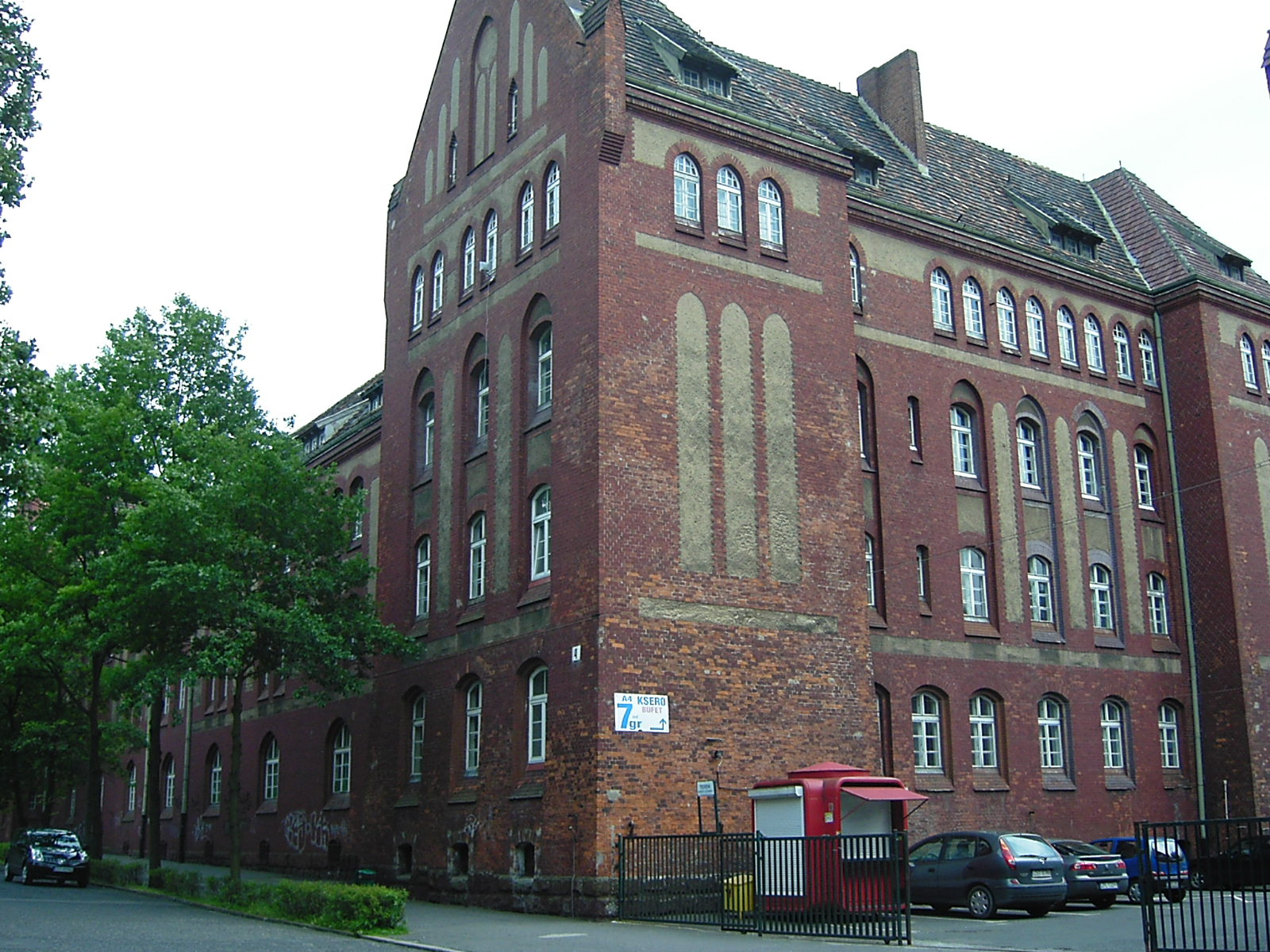
Original postwar Garrison of the Internal Security Corps in Szczecin, Poland

In 1965, the KBW were reformed into the Internal Defense Forces which were subordinated to the Ministry of National Defense.

== Duties ==
The KBW was responsible for protect key public strategic industrial and transport infrastructure such as power plants, railways, ports etc., as well as to combat and suppress the anti-Communist resistance in Poland, including activities of the "Cursed soldiers" as well as all organizations which continued their armed struggle against the Communist takeover, such as the Freedom and Independence (WiN), the National Armed Forces (NSZ), and the remnants of the Home Army (AK) among others. Between March 1945 and April 1947 alone, KBW units killed over 1,500 "Cursed soldiers", wounded 301, and captured approximately 12,200.

== Structure ==
- Command and Staff
  - Liaison Air Squadron
  - Signal Battalion (Warsaw)
  - Radio Line Company
  - Automotive Company
  - Security Company
  - Reserve Depot
- Political Board
  - Central Officers' Club
  - Song and Dance Ensemble
- Automotive Service Command
- Artillery and Armoured Weapons Command
- Chemical Service Command
- KBW Officers' School, Training Center (Legnica)
- Communications Non-Commissioned Officers' School (Prudnik)
- Engineer Troops Command
  - 9th Pomeranian Pontoon-Bridge Regiment (Bydgoszcz)
  - 10th Pontoon-Bridge Battalion (Rawicz)
  - 12th Pontoon-Bridge Battalion (Szczecin)
  - 16th Pontoon-Bridge Battalion (Koszalin)
  - 1st Battalion Engineer Battalion (Warsaw)
  - 2nd Engineer Battalion (Grajewo)
  - 4th Engineer Battalion (Rzeszów)
  - 6th Engineer Battalion (Lubliniec)
  - 11th Engineer Battalion (Jelenia Góra)
  - KBW Engineering Training Center (Pułtusk)
  - Fire Service (Poznań)
  - Fire Service (Szczecin)
  - Fire Service (Kraków)
  - Fire Service (Bydgoszcz)
- Vistula Brigade (Warsaw)
- Training Automobile Regiment (Łódź)
- Cadre Regiment
- Light Armored Regiment
- 1st Masovian KBW Brigade (Góra Kalwaria)
- 2nd Podlaska KBW Brigade (Białystok)
- 5th KBW Brigade of the Krakow Region (Kraków)
- 3rd KBW Regiment (Lublin)
- 6th KBW Regiment (Katowice)
- 10th Greater Poland KBW Regiment (Poznań)
- 11th Lower Silesian KBW Regiment (Wrocław-Jelenia Góra)
- 12th Szczecin Region KBW Regiment (Szczecin)
- 13th Kashubian KBW Regiment (Gdańsk)
- 15th Opole Region KBW Regiment (Prudnik-Opole)

== Commanding officers ==
1. March 1945 – May 1945: Col. Henryk Toruńczyk
2. Jun 1945 – September 1946: Gen. Bolesław Kieniewicz
3. 1946–1948: Brigadier General Konrad Świetlik
4. 1948–1951: Brigadier General Juliusz Hibner (born Dawid Szwarc)
5. 1 March 1951 – 12 March 1965: Brigadier General Włodzimierz Muś
6. August 1956 - July 1959: Brigadier General Wacław Komar (Acting commanding officer)
7. 12 March 1965 – 1 July 1965: Brigadier General Bronisław Kuriata

== See also ==
- Internal Troops of the Soviet Union – Soviet organization for the Internal Security Corps.
- Ministry of Public Security of Poland
- Operation Vistula (1947)
- Zygmunt Bauman

== Bibliography ==
- Misiuk, Andrzej (2014). Historia bezpieczeństwa wewnętrznego w Polsce (in Polish). Difin.
