= Territorial Defense Forces (Poland) =

- Obrona Terytorium Kraju
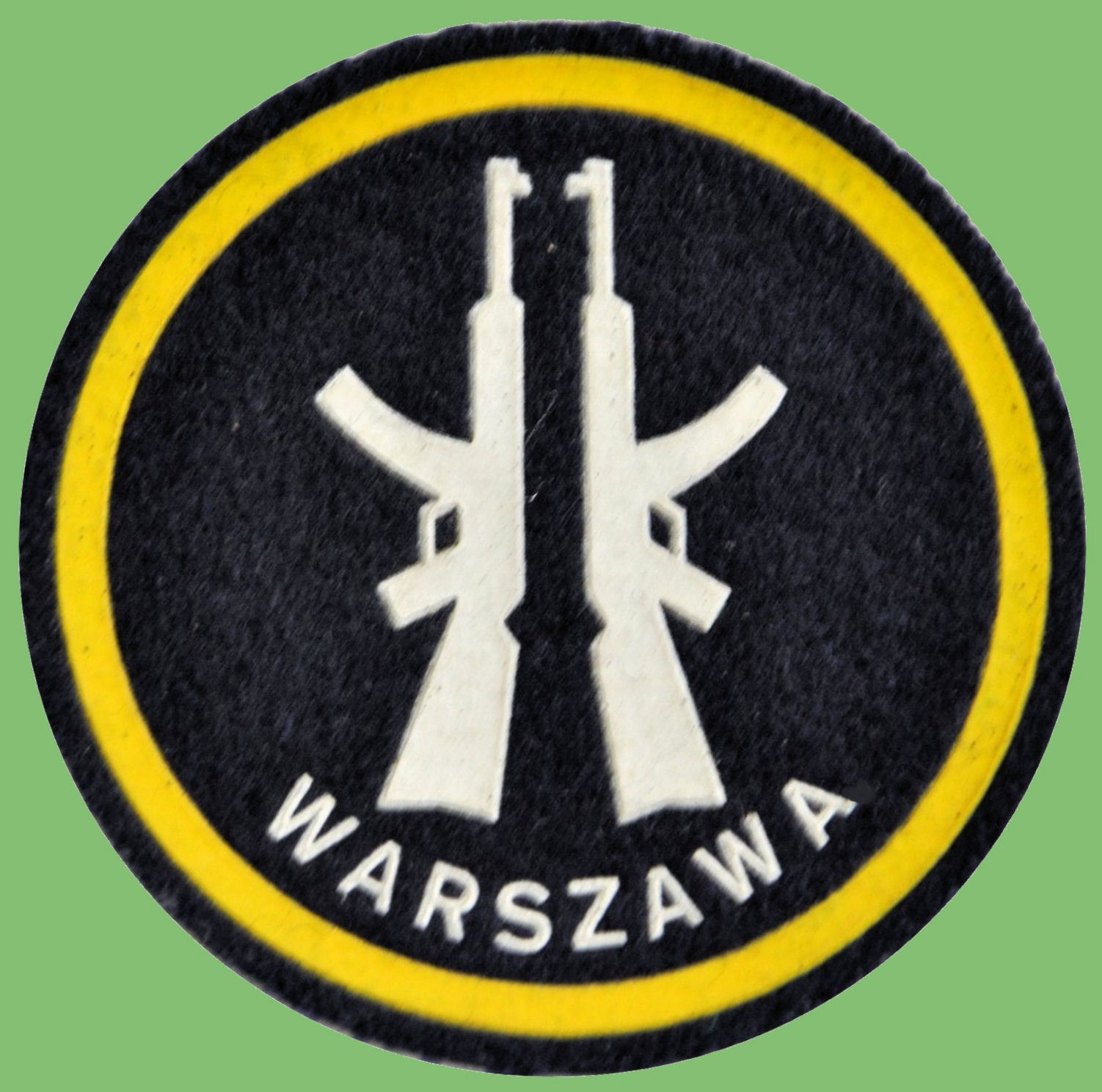
- Insignia of the OTK's Varsovian Brigade
- Active: 1965
- Disbanded: 2008
- Country: Poland
- Type: Armed force

The Territorial Defense Forces (Polish: Obrona Terytorium Kraju - OTK) was an armed force responsible for the internal security of Poland and separate from the Polish Army. The OTK existed from 1965 until 2008. As initially organized, OTK forces included both an "Internal Defense Forces" and the "Border Protection Troops". This style of internal security organization corresponded to that used by the Soviet Union during the same period.

After the fall of communism in Poland, changing political priorities led to the reduction of OTK forces. By 1 July 2008, the last of its battalions were converted to mechanized units of the army.

== History ==
The Territorial Defense Forces of the Country (OTK) were established in Poland by the resolution of the State Defense Committee of May 14, 1959, used to directly defend the country's territory against various threats (the external system consisted of operational troops intended to act as part of the United Armed Forces of the Warsaw Pact, assumed to be outside the country's territory). to help defend Polish territory in situations where the Polish People's Army was engaged abroad under Warsaw Pact obligations. Although their primary mission was defending the homeland, the OTK also had the Warsaw Pact mission of transporting Soviet forces and supplies across Poland in wartime. Formed mainly from units shifted from the Ministry of Internal Affairs, the OTK went under a new Inspectorate for National Territorial Defense in the Ministry of National Defense. In December 1965 Grzegorz Korczyński took over as Chief Inspector of Territorial Defense Forces. The OTK included the Internal Defense Forces (Polish: Wojska Obrony Wewnętrznej, WOW, the largest unit) and several smaller territorial defense units. Immediately after World War II, the WOW's predecessor organization, the Internal Security Corps (Polish: Korpus Bezpieczeństwa Wewnętrznego - KBW) had suppressed the Home Army, which had been loyal to the London government-in-exile; the KBW had also played a large part in suppressing the Poznan workers in 1956.

By 1990 the Territorial Defense Forces was not a credible military force. The organization included many nonmilitary patriotic and social groups, such as the boy scouts, and many military retirees found soft assignments in OTK units. Although the force had a military commander, it was not under the direct control of the Ministry of National Defense. By 1991 budget cuts were reducing personnel significantly, and plans called for transforming many OTK units into civil defense formations that would support production and service in the civilian economy. The OTK units remaining armed and attached to districts as regional defense forces would count as part of the ground forces' planned mid-1990s allotment of about 150,000 troops. They were to function as cadre units reinforcing operational ground forces within their territorial boundaries. Reduction of OTK units continued, and the last units of the OTK were converted to mechanized infantry units of the Polish Army by 1 July 2008.

The military Border Protection Troops (Polish: Wojska Ochrony Pogranicza) was disbanded in 1991, and replaced by the Straż Graniczna, whose commander reports to the Prime Minister. The change resulted in personnel reductions from 21,000 in 1991 to 13,500.

On November 16, 2016, the Sejm of the Republic of Poland passed the act establishing Territorial Defence Force from January 1, 2017.

== Organization and tasks ==
Their tasks, in addition to fighting against air attack means, air and sea landings, and combating enemy sabotage and reconnaissance groups, included the protection of important facilities and communication routes, securing the regrouping of operational troops by maintaining bridges and building crossings, supporting the forces of the Ministry of Internal Affairs in maintaining public order during war, and participation in work for the national economy and the elimination of natural disasters during peace. These troops actually began to be formed in 1963. The OTK troops included:

- Internal Defense Forces
- National Air Defense Forces (WOPK)
- Territorial Defense Forces of the Navy
- Territorial Defense Units (OT)

The basis for the formation of the OTK land forces were the newly formed Territorial Defense units (OT) and the Internal Defense Forces, established in 1966 by transferring the existing units of the Internal Security Corps.

== Bibliography ==
: Glenn E. Curtis (ed.), Poland : a country study, p. 267, Washington: GPO, 1994. ISSN 1057-5294.

- Zaloga, Steven J.; Loop, James (1985). Soviet Bloc Elite Forces. London: Osprey. ISBN 0-85045-631-2.
- Kajetanowicz, Jerzy (2013). "Wojska Obrony Terytorialnej Kraju w systemie bezpieczeństwa Polski w latach 1959-1989". Poligon (in Polish). 37 (2). Magnum-X. ISSN 1895-3344.
