= Society of Fighters for Freedom and Democracy =

Veterans' association in the Polish People's Republic

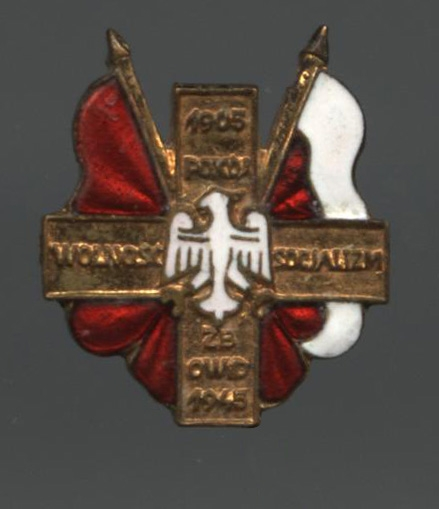
Badge of Society of Fighters for Freedom and Democracy (ZBoWiD)

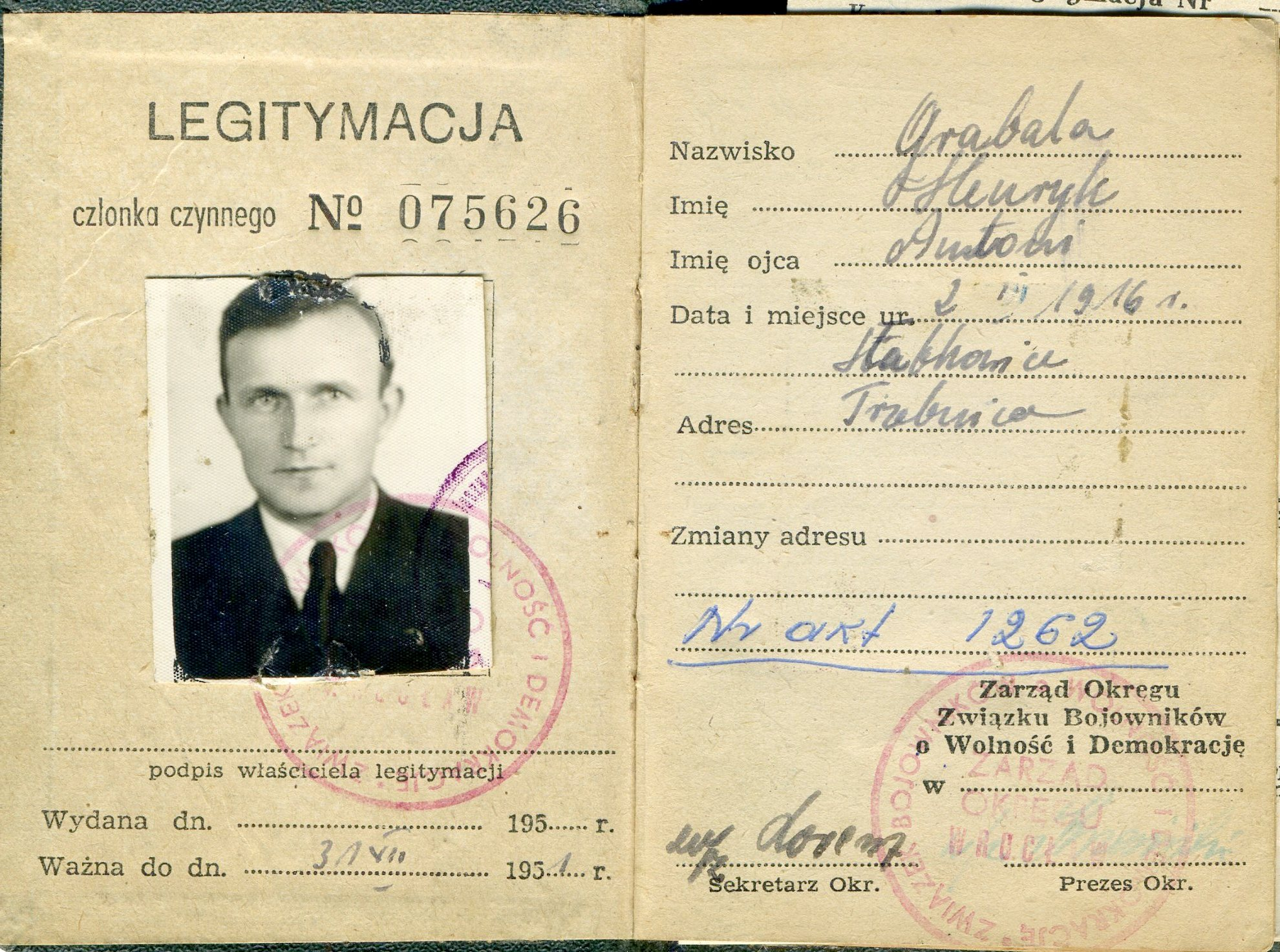
Society membership card

The Society of Fighters for Freedom and Democracy (Polish: Związek Bojowników o Wolność i Demokrację, ZBoWiD) was an official Polish state-controlled veterans association in the People's Republic of Poland. Initially headed by Franciszek Jóźwiak, it was formed on September 2, 1949 out of 11 pre-existing veterans associations. In its early period, and especially during the Stalinist years, the organization was formed mostly of former veterans of the Soviet-sponsored Polish People's Army, communist partisans and former concentration camp inmates. However, with the advent of a partial political thaw in the 1960s it also started accepting the veterans of other Polish formations that had fought in World War II.

Directly subordinate to the party, the society held an important place within the Polish governmental structure: it was the only authority certifying veterans' and combatants' rights and privileges in Poland. In 1970 the ZBoWiD had roughly 330,000 members, in 1986 almost 800,000. Among its leaders were Mieczysław Moczar and Włodzimierz Sokorski.

In April 1990, ZBoWiD was reformed into the Związek Kombatantów RP i Byłych Więźniów Politycznych (Society of Veterans of the Republic of Poland and Former Political Prisoners) for members of all Polish military formations including partisan, self-defence units, and the Polish Underground State.

== Chairmen ==
- Franciszek Jóźwiak (1948-1956)
- Janusz Zarzycki (1956-1964)
- Mieczysław Moczar (1964-1972)
- Stanisław Wroński (1972-1980)
- Włodzimierz Sokorski (1980-1983)
- Józef Kamiński (1983-1990)

== Bibliography ==
- Nowa Encyklopedia Powszechna PWN, Państwowe Wydawnictwo Naukowe, Warszawa, 2004, ISBN 83-01-14179-4
- August Grabski, Żydowski ruch kombatancki w Polsce w latach 1944-1949, Warszawa, 2002, ISBN 83-88542-17-6

== See also ==
- International Federation of Resistance Fighters – Association of Anti-Fascists
