= Krzysztof Ligęza =

Polish habilitated doctor

Krzysztof Zbigniew Ligęza
- Born: September 29, 1965 (age 61); Gdynia; Poland
- Military career
- Branch: Polish Navy
- Service years: 1988–2018
- Rank: Captain
- Units: 9th Coastal Defence Flotilla; Floating Units Group; ORP Czujny; ORP Zwrotny; Polish Naval Academy
- Conflicts: did not participate
- Awards: Cross of Merit, Naval Cross of Merit, Medal for Long Service, Medal of the Armed Forces in the Service of the Fatherland, Medal of Merit for National Defence, Medal of the National Education Commission, Honorary Naval Badge
- Other work: Associate Professor at the Polish Naval Academy

Krzysztof Zbigniew Ligęza (born 29 September 1965 in Gdynia) is a habilitated doctor specializing in security studies, reserve officer of the Polish Navy, former commander of the ships ORP Zwrotny and ORP Czujny, as well as the Floating Units Group, and director of the Institute of Maritime Operations at the Polish Naval Academy.

== Education ==
Krzysztof Ligęza grew up in the Przymorze district of Gdańsk, where in 1972 he began his education at Primary School No. 79 in Przymorze Wielkie. He continued his studies at the Macierz Szkolna Economic High School in Gdańsk, graduating in 1984. After passing his final exams, he was admitted to the Polish Naval Academy in Gdynia for officer studies.

After five years of study, in 1989, he earned the title of Master of Science in Marine Navigation based on his thesis Hydrometeorological Conditions for Submarine Search in Selected Areas of the Southern Baltic Sea, supervised by Professor Krzysztof Holec. In 1997, he completed postgraduate studies in management and command at the Polish Naval Academy. In 2000, by order of the Minister of National Defence, he was sent for postgraduate studies at the Joint Services Command and Staff College in Shrivenham.

In 2004, he obtained a doctorate in military sciences with a specialization in national maritime security. He defended his doctoral dissertation at the Faculty of Command and Naval Operations of the Polish Naval Academy, titled The Use of Anti-Submarine Warfare Forces and Means for the Protection and Defence of Polish Maritime Areas.

Nine years later, in December 2013, he earned a habilitation degree in social sciences in the field of security studies at the Faculty of Command and Naval Operations of the Polish Naval Academy. His habilitation thesis, Naval Forces in Crisis Response Operations, analyzed the tools for conducting military crisis response operations at sea, with particular emphasis on littoral (coastal) areas, which had become the primary theatre of potential conflicts. The study also highlighted the need to shift naval forces from conducting war at sea to waging war from the sea. In 2017, he was appointed Associate Professor at the Naval Academy.

== Military service ==
In July 1984, Krzysztof Ligęza began his studies as a cadet at the Polish Naval Academy in Gdynia. After four years, in September 1988, he was called up for professional military service. Upon completing the Polish Naval Academy, he was assigned to the 11th Division of Submarine Chasers, 9th Coastal Defence Flotilla, stationed in Hel. His first role on the ship was as the commander of the artillery and underwater weapons division aboard the submarine chaser ORP Zwrotny.

After 20 months as division commander, he was appointed deputy commander and, on 31 July 1992, became the commanding officer of the aforementioned vessel. He served as the commander of ORP Zwrotny until February 1994, when he was transferred to the sister ship ORP Czujny, which he commanded for 14 months. In addition to commanding ORP Czujny, he also served as the commander of the Floating Units Group.

In May 1995, after five years of service aboard ships, he transitioned to work at the Polish Naval Academy, taking the position of assistant in the Department of Tactics and Operational Art at the Institute of Command and Staff. After returning from studies at the Staff College in Shrivenham, UK, he became a senior lecturer and, in 2005, after earning his doctorate, an assistant professor at his alma mater.

In subsequent years, he held the position of head of the Department of Tactics and Operational Art and, starting from the 2011/2012 academic year, became an associate professor and director of the Institute of Maritime Operations, a role he held for two three-year terms. He concluded his professional military service as an associate professor at the Polish Naval Academy. On 31 January 2018, after 34 years of service, he was released from permanent military service and transferred to the reserve.

=== Officer ranks ===
- Ensign – 1988
- Lieutenant – 1996
- Lieutenant commander – 2002
- Commander – 2005
- Captain – 2007

== Research work ==
Captain Ligęza has participated in research projects primarily related to the Polish Navy and the maritime economy, both as a project leader and a contributor. He has reviewed doctoral and habilitation theses and served as secretary of habilitation committees.

He is also the author of numerous works, expert reports, defense standards, articles, scripts, textbooks, and monographs related to the Polish Navy, many of which have been presented at conferences both domestically and internationally, as well as published in scientific journals. Ligęza has been involved in scientific committees and has co-organized many conferences in Poland and abroad. For his organizational work and scientific achievements, he has been repeatedly recognized with numerous Rector's Awards from the Polish Naval Academy, and in 2009, he was honored with the title of "Teacher of the Year" by the rector. He is also the editor-in-chief of the journal Studia nad Obronnością i Bezpieczeństwem.

== Awards and decorations ==
- Bronze Cross of Merit (2006)
- Naval Cross of Merit (2015)
- Silver Medal for Long Service (2014)
- Gold Medal of the Armed Forces in the Service of the Fatherland (2014)
- Gold Medal of Merit for National Defence (2011)
- Silver Medal of the Armed Forces in the Service of the Fatherland (2006)
- Silver Medal of Merit for National Defence (2003)
- Bronze Medal of the Armed Forces in the Service of the Fatherland (2005)
- Bronze Medal of Merit for National Defence (1995)
- Medal of the National Education Commission (2008)
- Honorary Naval Badge

== Personal life ==
He is married to Joanna (née Orzeł) and has a daughter, Marta (born 1991).

He is a board member of the biegamyrazem.pl Sports Club Association, which brings together enthusiasts of running and other forms of recreation. In May 2015, he completed his first marathon at the 1st PZU Gdańsk Marathon. He also participates in other races, including half-marathons and shorter-distance runs.

== Publications ==
- Adamczyk-Retecka, Monika; Bugajski, Dariusz; Hołub-Śniadach, Olga; Ligęza, Krzysztof; Majkowska-Szulc, Sylwia; Nawrot, Justyna; Nawrot, Anna (2008). Prawo integracji w Europie. Podręczny leksykon tematyczny [The Law of Integration in Europe. A Handy Thematic Lexicon] (in Polish). Gdynia: Polish Naval Academy. p. 75.
- Badeński, Zbigniew; Kozłowski, Dariusz; Ligęza, Krzysztof; Łukasik, Ryszard; Sekuła, Jerzy; Sołkiewicz, Henryk; Zieliński, Mariusz, eds. (2012). Operacyjno-taktyczny leksykon morski [Operational-Tactical Naval Lexicon] (in Polish). Gdynia: Polish Naval Academy. p. 946. ISBN 978-83-60278-64-2.
- Ligęza, Krzysztof (2012). Leksykon działań sił morskich [Lexicon of Naval Forces Operations] (in Polish). Gdynia: Polish Naval Academy. p. 197. ISBN 978-83-60278-71-0.
- Ligęza, Krzysztof, ed. (2012). Marynarka Wojenna w systemie bezpieczeństwa Rzeczypospolitej Polskiej [Polish Navy in the Security System of the Republic of Poland] (in Polish). Gdynia: Polish Naval Academy. p. 323. ISBN 978-83-60278-68-0.
- Ligęza, Krzysztof (2013). "Siły morskie w operacjach reagowania kryzysowego" [Naval Forces in Crisis Response Operations] (PDF). Rocznik Bezpieczeństwa Morskiego (in Polish). Gdynia: Polish Naval Academy: 342. ISSN 1898-3189. Archived from the original (PDF) on 2018-07-08.
- Ligęza, Krzysztof (2013). Bezpieczeństwo Morskie Państwa. Zasady wykorzystywania Marynarki Wojennej [Maritime Security of the State. Principles of Using the Navy] (in Polish). Gdynia: Polish Naval Academy. p. 206. ISBN 978-83-60278-81-9.
- Ligęza, Krzysztof (2014). Huzarski, Michał; Wołejszo, Jarosław (eds.). Leksykon obronności Polska i Europa [Lexicon of Defense: Poland and Europe] (in Polish). Warsaw: Bellona. p. 249. ISBN 978-83-11-13382-2.
- Ligęza, Krzysztof (2015). "Charakterystyka dynamiki rozwoju okrętowych sił zwalczania okrętów podwodnych" [Characteristics of the Development Dynamics of Shipborne Anti-Submarine Forces]. In Sołkiewicz, Henryk (ed.). Ewolucyjny rozwój sił okrętowych Marynarki Wojennej w latach 1945–2010 [Evolutionary Development of the Polish Navy's Shipborne Forces from 1945 to 2010] (in Polish). Gdynia: Polish Naval Academy. pp. 327–403. ISBN 978-83-941308-4-8.
- Bursztyński, Andrzej; Bugajski; Fabisiak, Jacek; Krasnodębski, Grzegorz; Karwacka, Katarzyna; Ligęza, Krzysztof; Pączek, Bartłomiej; Sekuła, Jerzy (2016). Szubrycht, Tomasz (ed.). Leksykon bezpieczeństwa morskiego. 100 podstawowych pojęć [Lexicon of Maritime Security. 100 Basic Terms] (in Polish). Warsaw: C.H. Beck. p. 294. ISBN 978-83-255-7518-2.
- Ligęza, Krzysztof, ed. (2017). Systemy Bezzałogowe [Unmanned Systems] (in Polish). Gdynia: Polish Naval Academy. p. 146. ISBN 978-83-947841-0-2.
