= Polish Academy =

Polish Academy or Academy of Poland can refer to:

- Polish Academy of Arts and Sciences
- Polish Academy of Sciences
- Polish Film Academy
- Polish Naval Academy
