= Andraka =

Andraka is a surname. Notable people with the surname include:

- Dorota Andraka (born 1961), Polish-American educator
- Jack Andraka (born 1997), American award recipient
