= Dorota Andraka =

Polish-American educator

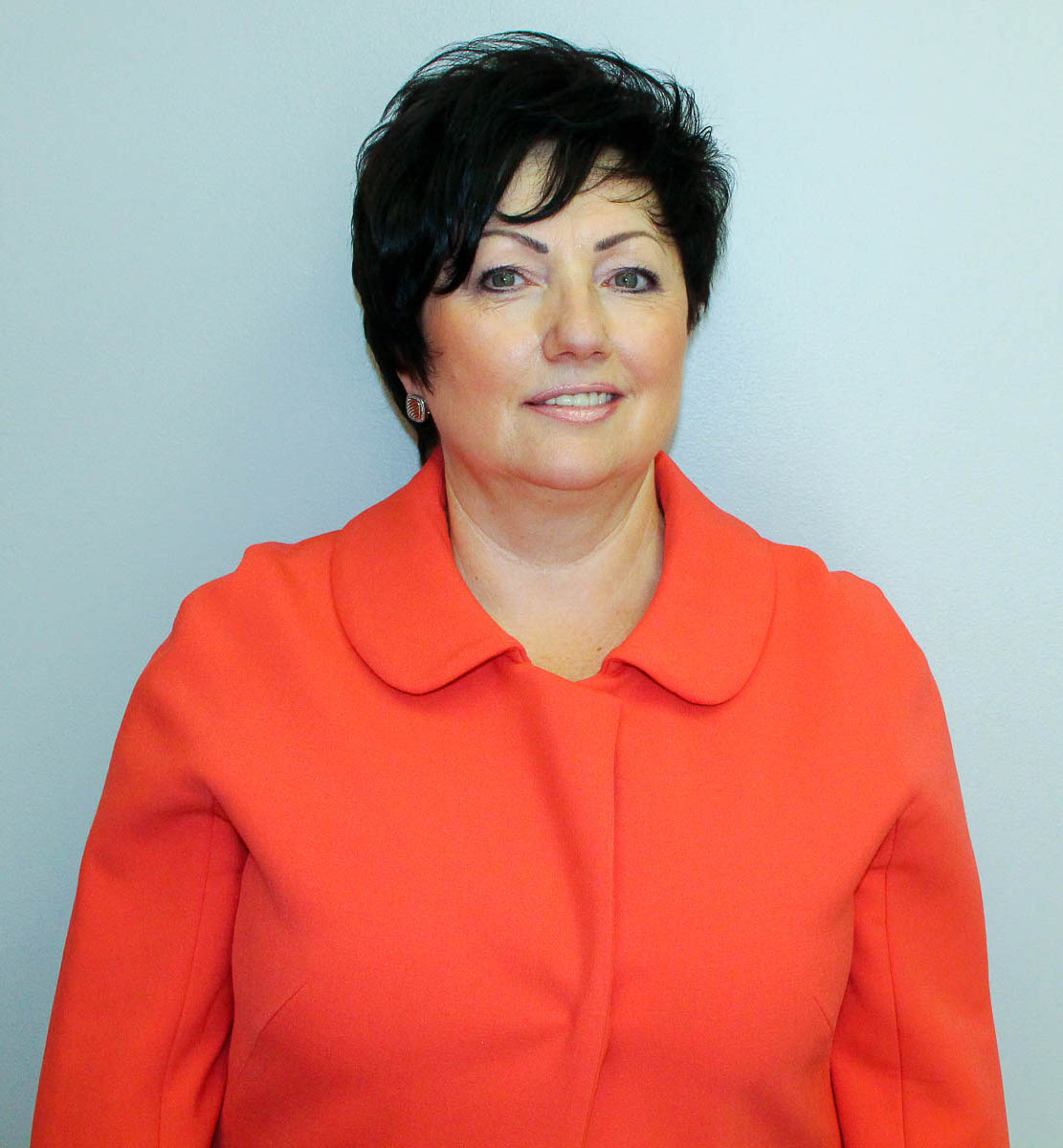
- Born: 26 November 1961 (age 64); Białystok, Poland
- Education: State University of New York, Jagiellonian University
- Occupation: Educator
- Known for: President of the Polish Supplementary School Council of America
- Awards: Order of Merit of the Republic of Poland Gold Cross of Merit (Poland) Medal of the National Education Commission

Dorota Andraka (born November 26, 1961) is a Polish-American educator and the longtime President of the Polish Supplementary School Council of America (Centrala Polskich Szkół Dokształcających). She has been a key figure in the development of Polish-language education in the United States and has organized programs in cooperation with Polish academic institutions and government ministries. She is a recipient of the Officer's Cross of the Order of Merit of the Republic of Poland.

== Biography ==
Dorota Andraka was born in Białystok, Poland, and later emigrated to the United States. She completed her studies at the State University of New York and the Jagiellonian University in Kraków.

She became Deputy President of the Polish Supplementary School Council of America in 2003 and was elected President in 2005.

Since 1994, she has served as director of the Polish Supplementary School at the Church of Saints Cyril and Methodius in Greenpoint, Brooklyn. Andraka has worked to elevate the status of Polish ethnic schools in the United States and promote Polish cultural traditions, language, and identity.

She is also a lecturer in Polish language at both American and Polish universities. and has organized professional training and psychological workshops for teachers, parents, and students for over 25 years. In 2009, in cooperation with Maria Curie-Skłodowska University, she organized postgraduate studies in teaching Polish as a foreign language.

Since 2010, she has overseen Polish language certification exams and since 2013, the LOTE (Languages Other Than English) exams—both recognized for college credit in the U.S. She initiated dialogue between the Polish Ministry of Education and the College Board regarding AP exams. In 2010, she became a member of the Polonia Education Council at the Ministry of Education and contributed to the development of curricula for Polish diaspora schools.

Under her leadership, the Council has become a sponsor of the Polish & Slavic Federal Credit Union, introduced educational scholarships for high school graduates since 2012, and Presidential Certificates of Recognition for top primary school graduates. In 2014, she co-organized the Teacher and Parent Committee Conference in New York with over 500 participants from Europe and America. In 2016, she led the methodology program at the Florida edition of the same conference. She also leads training sessions in educational leadership and heads the "Academy of Management" section in the journal Asystent.

She actively supports Polish youth by organizing integration camps in Poland, retreats at American Częstochowa, meetings with distinguished figures, international competitions, and the Polonia Schools Festival. In 2015, 2016, and 2019, she organized trips to Poland for over 100 Polish-American students, funded by Poland’s Ministry of Education and the Senate. She led a student exchange program in 2017–2018. and has organized annual holiday dinners for seniors at Krakus Senior Center since 2018. She also supports charitable causes, including the "Dar Serca" campaign launched in 2008.

In 2016, she established the Foundation for the Support of Polonia Education and introduced the Janina Igielska Award, granted for outstanding service to Polonia education. More than 180 people have since received the Medal of the Commission of National Education.

The Council under her leadership has maintained strong cooperation with the Polish Consulate in New York, the Embassy of Poland in Washington, D.C., and many Polish-American organizations.

== Language Certification and Educational Programs ==
Andraka is a co-organizer of the Polish Regents Exams and certification programs for Polish as a second language. These programs, overseen by the Ministry of National Education (Poland), are hosted at Columbia University in New York.

In 2017, Andraka led the organization of the first official certification exams in Polish as a foreign language by the State Commission for Certification of Proficiency in Polish. The exams, held in New York, were attended by over 100 students from New York, New Jersey, Connecticut, and Florida.

== Awards and recognition ==
She was hosted in 2017 by Agata Kornhauser-Duda, the First Lady of Poland, at the Presidential Palace in Warsaw to discuss the state of Polish education in the United States.

In 2019, she received the Officer’s Cross of the Order of Merit of the Republic of Poland from President Andrzej Duda during his official visit to New Britain, Connecticut.

She has also received the Medal of the Commission of National Education (2001), Gold Cross of Merit (2007), Knight's Cross of the Order of Merit (2009), Officer’s Cross of the Order of Merit (2018), Janina Igielska Statuette (2008), Medal Amicis Universitatis Mariae Curie-Skłodowska (2010), Shining Star Catholic Award, Friend of the Child Award (Fundacja Czarneckiego), honors from the Pauline Fathers and UMCS.

In 2024, she received the Medal for Merits to the Youth awarded by the Polish Youth Association, one of the highest honors bestowed by the organization, in recognition of her decades-long commitment to Polish youth, including her leadership in educational programming, student exchange, and cultural preservation.

In 2020, Andraka was featured as a speaker at the international conference "Kondycja oświaty polonijnej – stan i potrzeby w warunkach epidemii" hosted by Poland’s Ministry of Foreign Affairs.

== Personal life ==
Dorota Andraka resides in New York State with her husband Marek. They have two sons, Sebastian and Damian.
