= Paweł Strumiłło =

Polish professor of technical sciences

Paweł Karol Strumiłło
- Born: 28 January 1959 (age 67); Łódź, Poland
- Title: Professor of Technical Sciences

Academic background
- Education: PhD: 1993, University of Strathclyde (Supervisor: Tariq Durrani) Habilitation: 2002, Łódź University of Technology Professorship: 2013

Academic work
- Discipline: Biomedical signal and image processing, human–computer interfaces, image and signal processing
- Institutions: Łódź University of Technology

Paweł Karol Strumiłło (born 28 January 1959 in Łódź, Poland) is a Polish professor of technical sciences specializing in medical electronics, signal and image processing, and human–computer communication systems. He is a professor at the Łódź University of Technology, served as Vice-Rector for Development from 2020 to 2025, and has been Director of the Institute of Electronics since 2015.

== Education ==
In 1983, Professor Strumiłło graduated from the Institute of Electronics at the Łódź University of Technology. He completed his doctoral studies at the University of Strathclyde in the United Kingdom and earned a PhD in Electrical Engineering in 1993. His doctoral dissertation focused on medical electronics. In 2002, he obtained the postdoctoral degree (habilitation) from the Łódź University of Technology. He was awarded the title of Professor of Technical Sciences in 2013. Professor Strumiłło has been affiliated with the Łódź University of Technology since 1983.

== Scientific activity ==
His research activities focus on medical electronics, signal and image analysis, computational intelligence, and human–computer communication systems. He is the author or co-author of more than 200 scientific publications and three books devoted to signal and image analysis, computational intelligence, and electronic personal navigation systems for people who are blind or visually impaired. He has led eight research projects.

He teaches courses at the Łódź University of Technology in electronics, signal and image processing, and information and communication technologies. He has supervised thirteen doctoral dissertations.

Between 1998 and 2005, he served as Deputy Director of the Institute of Electronics for Research. From 2005 to 2015, he headed the Department of Medical Electronics. In 2015, he was appointed Director of the Institute of Electronics. From 2020 to 2025, he served as Vice-Rector for Development of the Łódź University of Technology.

Professor Strumiłło is a Senior Member of IEEE. Since 2007, he has been a member of the Electronics and Telecommunications Committee of the Polish Academy of Sciences, and since 2015 also a member of the Committee on Biocybernetics and Biomedical Engineering of the Polish Academy of Sciences.

He is also a member of the Łódź Scientific Society. Since 2020, he has served as Chair of the Łódź ICT Cluster. He is the Chair of the Presidium of the Users’ Council of the LODMAN Metropolitan Computer Network in Łódź for the 2024–2028 term. Between 2015 and 2017, he was a member of the management committee of a Horizon 2020 project focused on assistive systems for blind people. He was appointed to the Main Council of Science and Higher Education for the 2026–2029 term. He has served as a member of the jury of the “Łódź Programmer of the Year” competition.

His principal research interests include medical electronics; biomedical signal processing; human–computer communication systems; assistive technologies for people with visual impairments.

== Awards and distinctions ==
Professor Strumiłło has received numerous awards and distinctions:

- 1989 – Award of the Ministry of Science and Higher Education for research on computer image-processing systems.
- 2004 – Silver Cross of Merit.
- 2009 – Medal of the National Education Commission and an award for the best interdisciplinary achievement in technology transfer at the Łódź University of Technology.
- 2010 – Gold Medal at the International Exhibition of Inventions in Geneva for the invention Eye-blink Human Computer Interface.
- 2012 – Award of the Polish Agency for Enterprise Development for a project involving an electronic orientation-support system for people with visual impairments, recognized in the “Polish Future Product” competition.
