= Polish & Slavic Center =

Polish-American nonprofit community organization in New York City

- Formation: 1972
- Type: Nonprofit organization
- Headquarters: 177 Kent Street, Brooklyn, NY 11222
- Location: Greenpoint, Brooklyn, New York City
- Coordinates: 40°43′52″N 73°57′13″W
- Region served: New York City metropolitan area
- Services: Cultural programs, senior services, immigration legal aid
- Website: en.polishslaviccenter.us

The Polish & Slavic Center (PSC) (Polish: Centrum Polsko-Słowiańskie) is a nonprofit social and cultural organization based in Greenpoint, Brooklyn, New York City, dedicated to serving the Polish-American and Slavic communities. Founded in 1972, it has grown to become one of the largest Polish-American organizations on the East Coast of the United States, offering services that include social assistance, senior programming, legal aid for immigrants, cultural activities, and community events.

== History ==
The Polish & Slavic Center was established in 1972 by a group of Polish immigrants who sought to assist their growing community in adapting to life in the United States. Initially, PSC focused on providing housing support, employment resources, translation services, and legal aid.

The organization's formation was closely linked to the rise of the Polish diaspora in New York City during the 1970s, particularly in the Greenpoint neighborhood. It emerged in response to the lack of institutional support for newly arrived immigrants, who often faced language barriers, economic insecurity, and limited access to social services.

In 1976, the PSC founded the Polish & Slavic Federal Credit Union (PSFCU) as a financial cooperative designed to address the economic needs of the Polish-American community. Initially housed within the PSC's offices, the credit union provided affordable banking services and small loans, growing rapidly due to strong community support. While the PSC and PSFCU later became distinct organizations, their shared origins reflect PSC’s foundational role in strengthening the economic infrastructure of the Polish-American population.

Throughout the 1980s and 1990s, PSC expanded its physical presence and programming, acquiring additional properties and developing services for seniors, youth, and new immigrants. By the early 2000s, PSC was recognized not only as a community center but also as a cultural institution preserving and promoting Polish heritage in the United States.

== Leadership ==
The PSC is governed by a Board of Directors elected by its membership. The board oversees the organization’s strategic direction, financial operations, and programmatic initiatives. The Executive Director manages day-to-day operations in collaboration with program managers and community coordinators.

Former board chairs and executive staff have played a key role in shaping PSC’s development, particularly during periods of expansion and during the founding of the Polish & Slavic Federal Credit Union.

== Programs and Services ==
=== Krakus Senior Center ===
Located at 176 Java Street in Greenpoint, the Krakus Senior Center provides weekday meals, recreational activities, and comprehensive social services for approximately 130 seniors. It is funded by the New York City Department for the Aging and offers programs such as art workshops, exercise classes, health screenings, and cultural celebrations.

=== John Paul II Friendship Center ===
Established in the East Village of Manhattan, the John Paul II Friendship Center serves around 75 seniors daily. The center provides hot meals, educational activities, social support, and field trips to cultural events. It is a key part of PSC’s commitment to improving the quality of life for elderly members of the community.

=== Extended social services ===
The extended social services department helps individuals and families navigate public benefit systems including Social Security, Medicare, Medicaid, SNAP, and housing assistance. Bilingual social workers provide consultations, referrals, and advocacy support.

=== Immigration and legal services ===
The PSC began offering immigration legal assistance in 1994. Services include green card and citizenship applications, family reunification petitions, and legal workshops on immigrant rights. Accredited representatives help clients with USCIS filings and provide referrals for complex legal matters.

=== Cultural and educational programming ===
The center organizes art exhibitions, concerts, lectures, and Polish holiday celebrations such as Wigilia (Christmas Eve) and Dyngus Day. PSC also supports educational initiatives like ESL (English as a Second Language) classes, citizenship preparation, and workshops on Polish folk traditions.

=== PSC Cafeteria ===
Located within the main PSC building, the cafeteria is known for serving traditional Polish cuisine, such as pierogi, bigos, and kotlet schabowy. It is a popular gathering place for both community members and visitors, praised by local publications for its authentic fare.

== See also ==
- Polish & Slavic Federal Credit Union
- Polish Supplementary School Council of America
- Kościuszko Foundation
- Józef Piłsudski Institute of America
