= Joanna Pilecka =

Polish diplomat

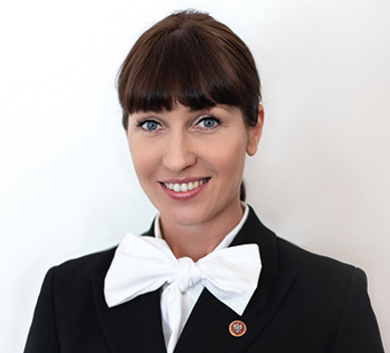

Poland Ambassador to Portugal
- In office 6 August 2021 – July 2024
- Preceded by: Jacek Junosza Kisielewski

Personal details
- Born: 25 October 1976 (age 49) Bydgoszcz
- Education: Kazimierz Wielki University in Bydgoszcz, Gdynia Maritime University

Joanna Maria Pilecka (born 25 October 1976 in Bydgoszcz) is a Polish diplomat, serving as an ambassador to Portugal (2021–2024).

== Life ==
Pilecka graduated from the Kazimierz Wielki University in Bydgoszcz and English studies at the Gdynia Maritime University.

She began her professional career at the Prokom company as deputy director of the Department of Promotion. In 2007, she joined the Ministry of Foreign Affairs (MFA). She was posted at the Embassy in Sofia, Bulgaria (2007–2012). In 2017, she started her work at the Consulate-General in Istanbul, Turkey. Between 2018 and 2020 she was serving as a Consul-General there. Following her return to Poland, she was working at the Department of Consular Affairs. On 9 September 2020, she became head of the MFA Diplomatic Academy. In 2021, she was nominated Poland Ambassador to Portugal. She started her term on 6 August 2021 and presented her letter of credence to the president Marcelo Rebelo de Sousa on 29 September 2021. She ended her mission in July 2024.

In 2020, she was honoured by the Minister of Culture Piotr Gliński with the Decoration of Honor Meritorious for Polish Culture in recognition for her work in Istanbul.

Besides Polish, she speaks English and Bulgarian, as well basic Spanish, German and Turkish. Married to Konstantin Stefanov Tufektcheiv.
