= Dariusz Bugajski =

Polish Navy officer and lawyer

- Born: 24 January 1970 (age 56); Ostrowiec Świętokrzyski, Poland
- Military career
- Allegiance: Poland
- Branch: Polish Navy
- Service years: 1989–
- Rank: Captain (N) (komandor)
- Commands: submarine chaser
- Awards: Medal of Merit for National Defence

Dariusz Rafał Bugajski is a Polish Navy officer, scholar and professor of public international maritime law specializing in the law of the sea, law of naval operations, naval warfare, and international security, including climate challenges.

== Education ==
Bugajski earned a Master of Engineering from the Polish Naval Academy and thereafter, a Master of Arts in Law from the University of Gdańsk. He received a Doctorate of Security from the Polish Naval Academy, and a habilitation in international law at the Faculty of Law at Szczecin University in 2009, and graduated from postgraduate security studies too.

== Career ==
Bugajski served in the 8th Coastal Defence Flotilla in Świnoujście and thereafter, as a commanding officer of an Anti-submarine Warfare Naval Ship (fast attack craft) in Kołobrzeg. While in Gdynia among others, he was a vice dean of the Faculty, and vice-rector of the Polish Naval Academy for education (2016-2019). He is a member of the Maritime Law Commission of the Polish Academy of Sciences, the Shipbuilding Council Society, the International Society for Military Law and the Law of War, national expert of the Advisory Board on the Law of the Sea (International Hydrographic Organization) and expert of the Polish Navy Hydrographic Office.

== Publications and editorial work ==
Bugajski authored and co-authored numerous publications regarding various aspects of international law, the law of the sea, international humanitarian law, and international security. His works have appeared in the “Revista Europea de Derecho de la Navegación Marítima y Aeronáutica” published by the University of Málaga. He is editor-in-chief of the “International Humanitarian Law” journal published by the Polish Naval Academy in Gdynia. He serves on numerous editorial boards, including the “Maritime Security Yearbook”. His books were nominated for the Mountbatten Award for Best Book by the Maritime Foundation.

- D.R. Bugajski, The Polish Naval Academy. In the Centenary of Regaining Access to the Baltic Sea, Gdynia 2019, pp. 185. ISBN 978-83-953887-2-9 (POLISH NAVAL ACADEMY); ISBN 978-83-7591-714-7 (REGION)
- D.R. Bugajski, Navigational Rights and Freedoms in the International Law and Practice, Polish Naval Academy, Gdynia 2021, pp. 353
- D.R. Bugajski, The legal protection of the RMS Titanic, "Santander Art and Culture Law Review", 1/2022 (8), pp. 41–60; https://www.ejournals.eu/SAACLR/2022/1-2022/art/22225/.

== Awards and decorations ==
- Maritime Cross of Merit
- Silver Medal of the Armed Forces in the Service of the Fatherland
- Gold Medal of Merit for National Defence
- Medal of the National Education Commission
