= Gdynia Maritime University =

Polish maritime university

Coordinates: 54°31′35″N 18°30′42″E

- Polish: Uniwersytet Morski w Gdyni
- Latin: Universitatis Maritimae Gdinensis
- Former names: Wyższa Szkoła Morska w Gdyni, Akademia Morska w Gdyni
- Type: Public
- Established: 1920
- Affiliations: International Association of Maritime Universities
- Rector: Adam Weintrit
- Students: 3,552 (12.2023)
- Location: Gdynia, Poland
- Campus: Urban
- Website: umg.edu.pl

University rankings

Regional – Overall
- QS Emerging Europe and Central Asia: 241-250 (2022)

The Gdynia Maritime University (Polish: Uniwersytet Morski w Gdyni) is one of two colleges in Poland which specialises in educating highly qualified officers for the maritime industry, especially for the merchant navy.

== History ==
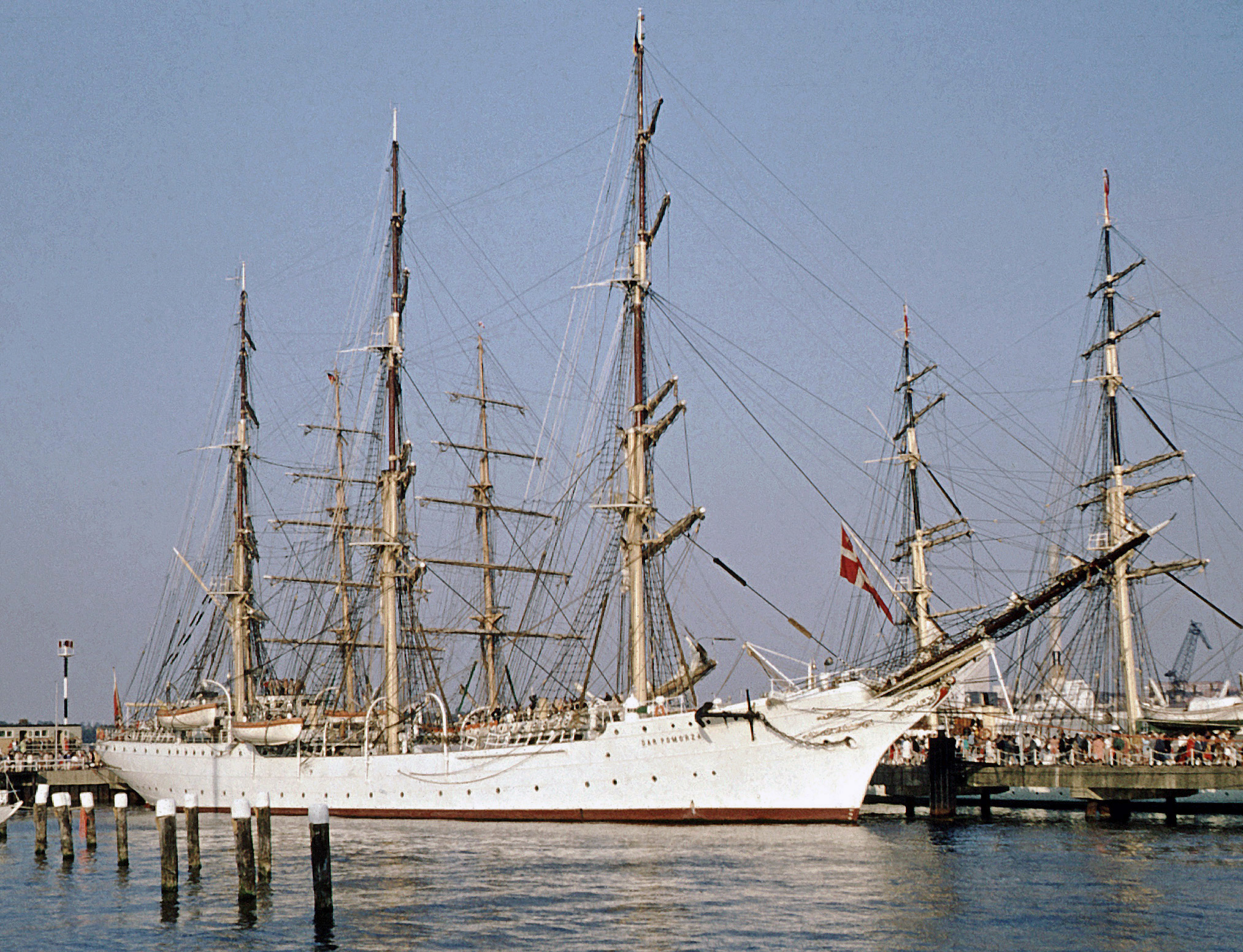
Dar Pomorza was a sail training ship of the University

The university was established in 1920 as the Maritime School in Tczew with faculties of navigation and mechanics. In 1930, the school was moved to Gdynia, to a newly built complex of buildings at ul. Morska, and its name was changed to the State Maritime School. During the war, the school operated in England, Southampton and London.

In 1921 the flag was raised on the first STS Lwów school vessel. In 1930, STS Lwów was replaced with STS Dar Pomorza. It was later replaced by STS Dar Młodzieży.

In 2001, the university received the status of an academy and the name of Gdynia Maritime Academy.

Until 2009, students were undergoing compulsory, 4-semesters (previously, 6 semesters) military training, taking the military oath and receiving lower military ranks and bearing the title of cadet. The military training ended with an officer's exam, confirmed by a certificate. Currently, the Military School has been withdrawn from the curriculum.

Based on the regulation of the Minister of Maritime Economy and Inland Navigation of July 2, 2018, Gdynia Maritime Academy adopted the University name.

== Faculties ==
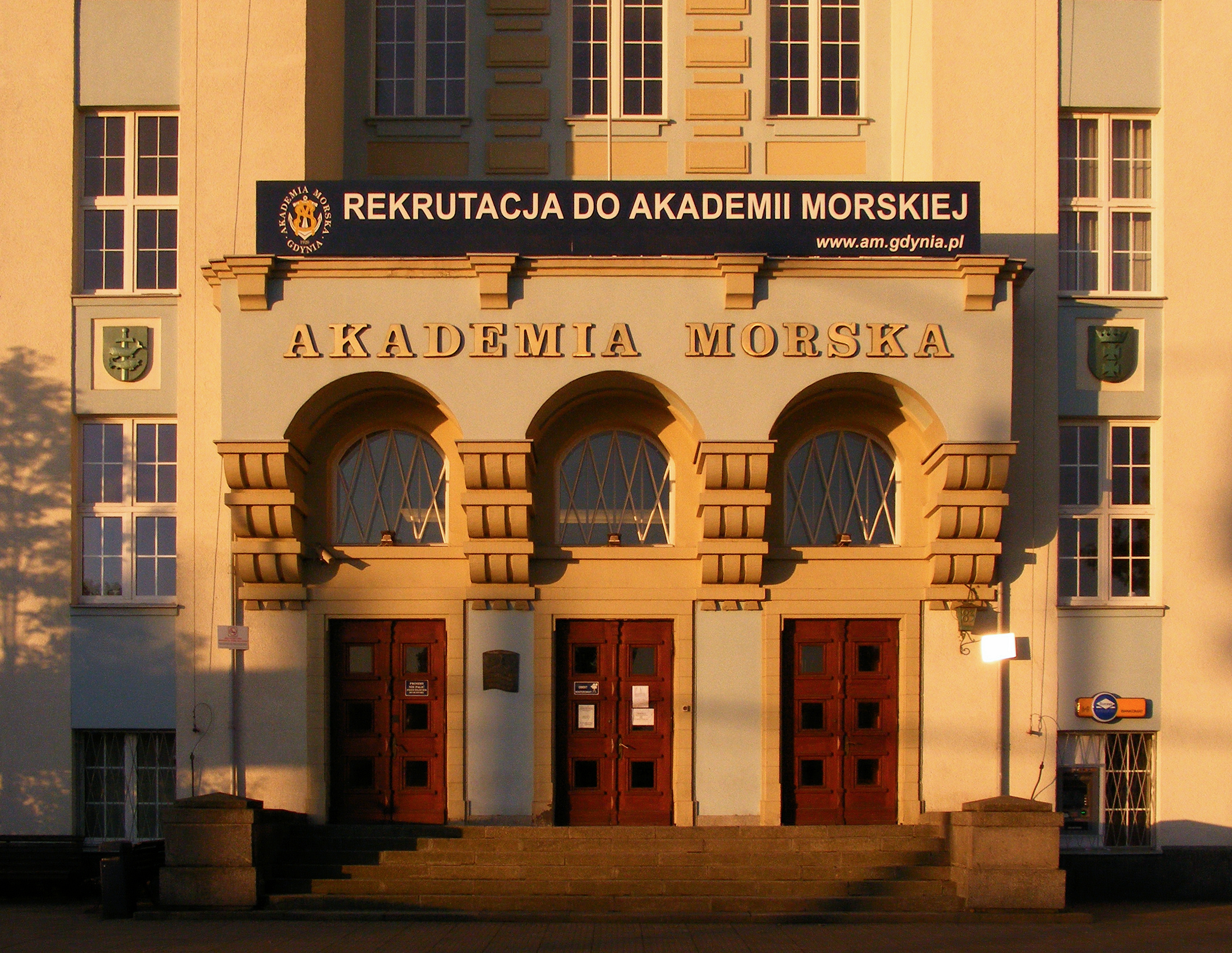
Main GMU campus

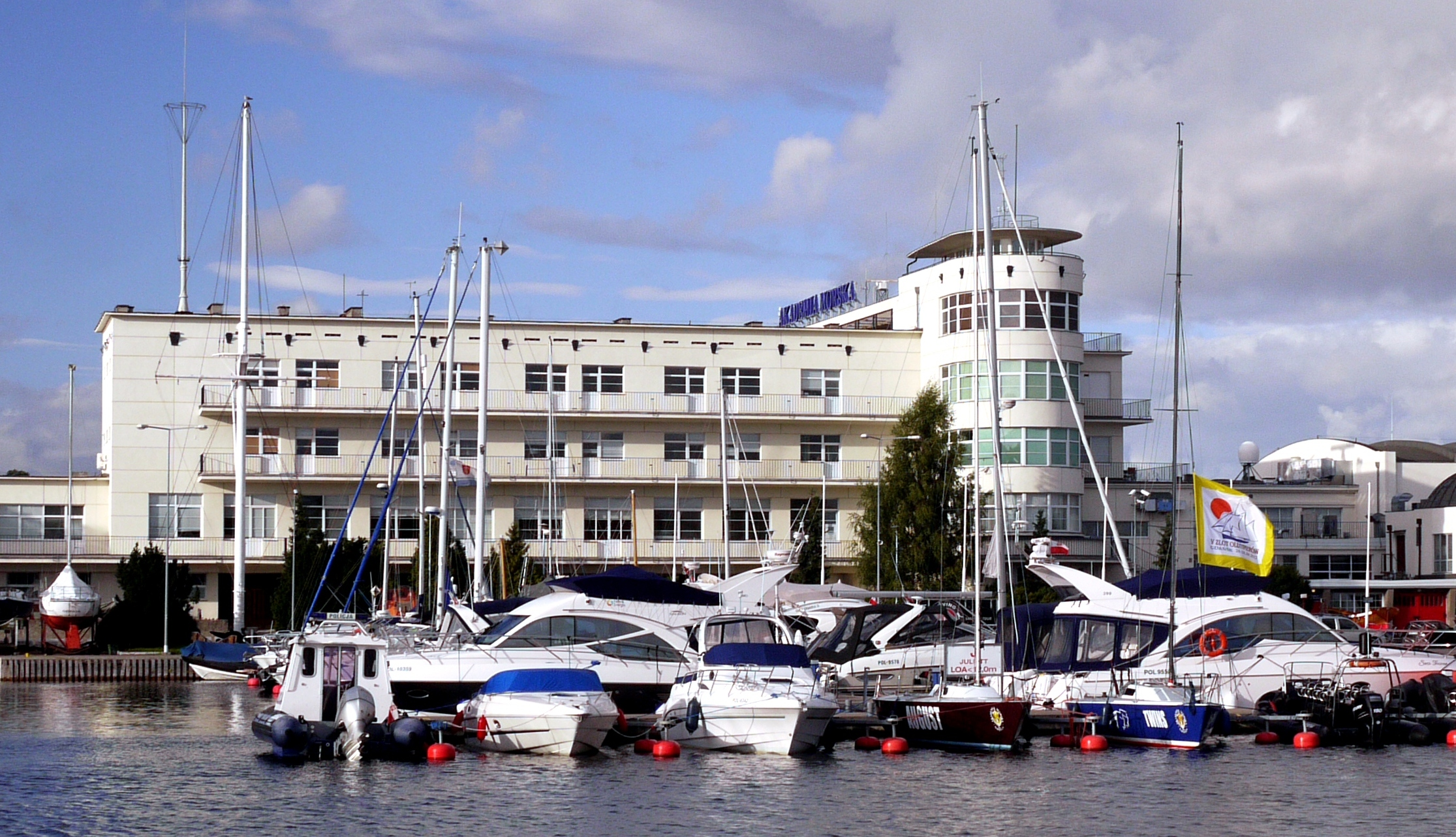
Department of Nautical Science

The academy offers full and part-time courses in the following areas:

Department of Entrepreneurship and Commodities

- Commodities
- Management

Department of Maritime Engineering

- Marine Engineering

Department of Nautical Science

- Nautical Science
- Transport and Logistics

Department of Electrical Engineering

- Electrical Engineering
- Electronics Engineering

=== Rectors ===
1. Antoni Garnuszewski (1920–1929)
2. Adam Mohuczy (1929–1936)
3. Władysław Kosianowski-Lorenz (1936–1937)
4. Stanisław Kosko (1937–1939)
5. Antoni Zieliński (1940–1943)
6. Karol Olgierd Borchardt (1945–1946)
7. Konstanty Matyjewicz-Maciejewicz (1945–1947)
8. Antoni Garnuszewski (1947–1948)
9. Mieczysław Jurewicz (1949–1967)
10. Kazimierz Jurkiewicz (1967–1969)
11. Bohdan Kowalczyk (1969–1972)
12. Daniel Duda (1972–1981)
13. Mikołaj Kostecki (1981)
14. Władysław Rymarz (1981–1984)
15. Piotr Jędrzejowicz (1984–1989)
16. Kazimierz Włodarski (1989)
17. Józef Lisowski (1989–1996)
18. Piotr Przybyłowski (1996–2002)
19. Józef Lisowski (2002–2008)
20. Romuald Cwilewicz (2008–2012)
21. Piotr Jędrzejowicz (2012–2016)
22. Janusz Zarębski (2016–2020)
23. Adam Weintrit (2020–)

== Notable alumni ==
- Marek Gróbarczyk, minister of Maritime Economy
- Miron Babiak, sailor and researcher
- Joanna Pilecka, ambassador to Portugal
- Rafał Bruski, voivode of Kuyavian-Pomeranian Voivodeship

== See also ==
- Karol Olgierd Borchardt
- Maritime University of Szczecin
