= Jacek Junosza Kisielewski =

Polish biologist & diplomat (born 1952)

Jacek Junosza Kisielewski Ph.D.
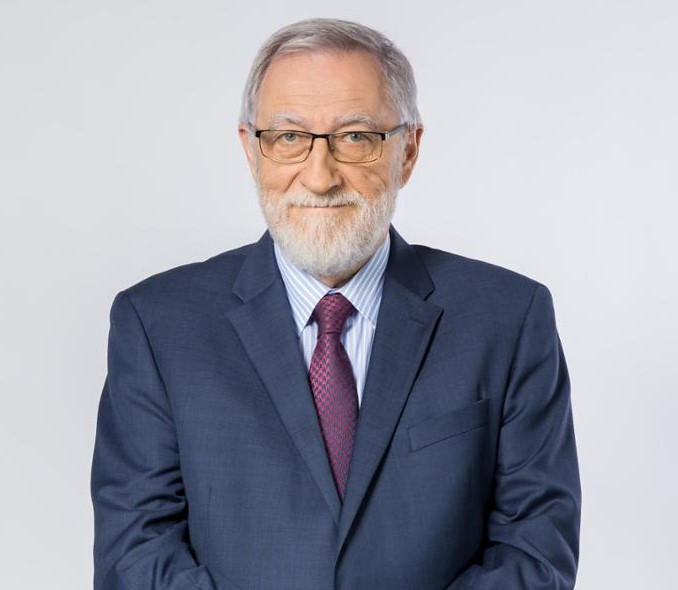

Poland Ambassador to Brazil
- In office 2007–2013
- Preceded by: Paweł Kulka Kulpiowski
- Succeeded by: Andrzej Braiter

Poland Ambassador to Portugal
- In office September 2016 – 14 August 2020
- Preceded by: Bronisław Misztal
- Succeeded by: Joanna Pilecka

Personal details
- Born: 21 January 1952 (age 74) Poznań
- Spouse: Grażyna Junosza Kisielewska
- Children: 1 daughter
- Education: Adam Mickiewicz University in Poznań
- Profession: Diplomat, biologist
- Website: jjknatura.com/

Jacek Marek Junosza Kisielewski (Polish pronunciation: [j'at͡sɛk m'arɛk jun'ɔʂa kʲiɕɛl'ɛfskʲi]; born 21 January 1952, in Poznań) is a Polish biologist and diplomat; ambassador to Brazil (2007–2013) and Portugal (2016–2020).

== Life ==
Jacek Junosza Kisielewski studied Biology at the Adam Mickiewicz University in Poznań. In 1978, he defended his doctoral thesis, and, in 1990, post-doctoral degree (habilitation) on Inland-water Gastrotricha from Brasil. He was working as a biologist at the University of Agriculture and Pedagogy in Siedle and at the Research Centre for Agricultural and Forest Environment of Polish Academy of Sciences in Poznań. He was a visiting professor at the University of São Paulo (1984–1985). He has also been carrying out research at the Amazon delta. He was doctoral advisor of one thesis (1992).

In 1991, he joined the Ministry of Foreign Affairs of Poland. Between 1991 and 1996, he served at the Consulate General in Brussels, since 1992 as Consul-General. Later, he was working at the MFA Consular Department, and as director of the Department for Cooperation with Polish Diaspora. From 1999 to 2004, he was Consul-General in Toronto. Following his directoral post at the Consular Department, he was nominated Poland ambassador to Brazil, presenting his letter of credence on 13 February 2008. He ended his term in 2013. Afterwards, he was back at the Department for Cooperation with Polish Diaspora and Poles Abroad, since 2014 as a director. In August 2016, he was nominated Poland ambassador to Portugal, accredited to the president Marcelo Rebelo de Sousa on 19 October 2016. He ended his term on 14 August 2020.

Besides Polish, Junosza Kisielewski speaks English, French, and Portuguese. He is married to Grażyna Junosza Kisielewska, with a daughter. In his free time, he photographs nature.

== Honours ==
- Brazil:
  - Grand Cross of the Order of the Southern Cross (2013)
  - Honorary citizen of São Paulo
- Poland: Pro Memoria Medal (2010)
- Portugal: Grand Cross of the Order of Merit (2020)

== Works ==
- Kisielewski, Jacek (1998), Brzuchorzęski (Gastrotricha) : (z 108 rysunkami w tekście), Łódź: Polskie Towarzystwo Hydrobiologiczne, Wydawnictwo Uniwersytetu Łódzkiego, ISBN 83-7171-138-7, OCLC 749790780
