= Polish Naval Academy =

Public university in Gdynia, Poland (est. 1922)

Polish Naval Academy of the Heroes of Westerplatte
- Akademia Marynarki Wojennej im. Bohaterów Westerplatte
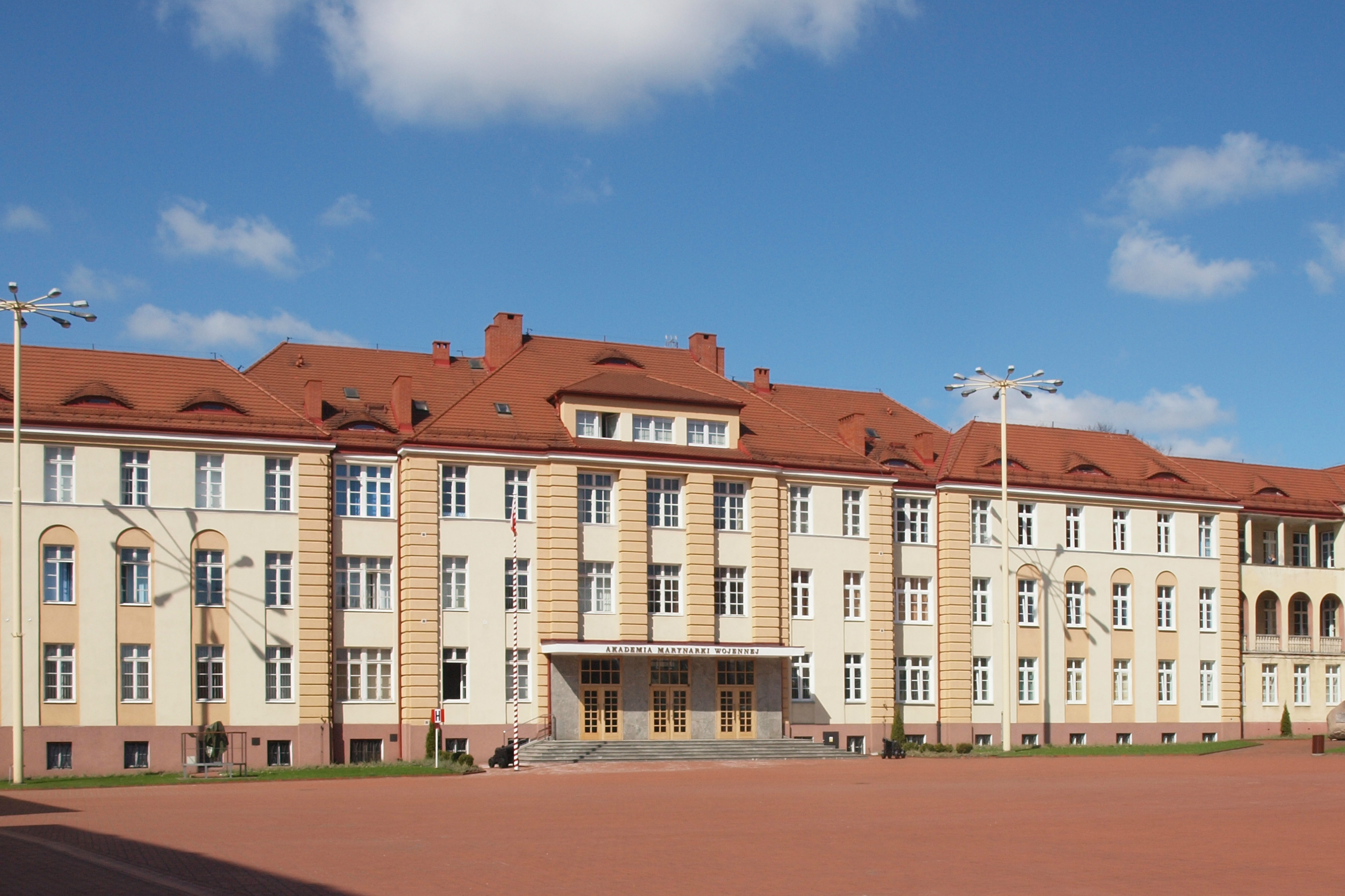
- Main entrance
- Motto: Morze, Ojczyzna, Obowiązek
- Motto in English: Sea, Fatherland, Duty
- Established: 1922
- Rector: RDML prof. Tomasz Szubrycht
- Students: 2,206 (12.2023)
- Location: Gdynia, Pomeranian Voivodeship, Poland; 54.5438°N 18.5442°E
- Language: Polish/English
- Website: www.amw.gdynia.pl
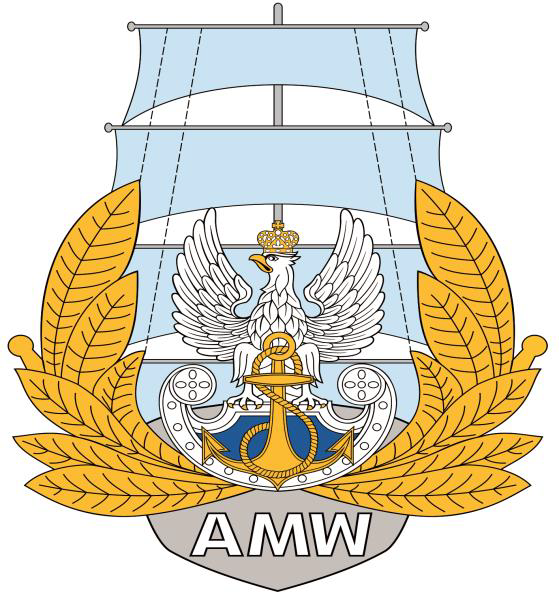

The "Heroes of Westerplatte" Polish Naval Academy (PNA) is a naval university supervised by the Ministry of National Defence of the Republic of Poland, with a history, uninterrupted by World War II, dating back to 1922.

The Polish Naval Academy educates officer-cadets, commissioned officers, and civilian undergraduate and graduate students, as well as doctoral students. It also offers opportunities for professional development in specialized courses and postgraduate programs.

Pursuant to international agreements, the Polish Naval Academy trains officers for navies of countries in Europe, North Africa, the Near East, and the Far East. International exchanges augment the knowledge of Polish Naval Academy staff and enable students to attend lectures by some of the best experts from leading academic centers in the world.

== History ==
=== Temporary Officers' Training Corps (1921) ===
After the foundation of Polish Naval Forces on November 28 of 1918 by the time's Chief of State Józef Piłsudski the formation of its military branch was started. One of the main goals was a formation of a training structure, due to the lack of cadets. The plan was at first to start a Maritime School and a training division which was completed in 1920.

There was no need for this type of training structure until the Polish-Soviet war of 1920, since all of the naval forces were being outsourced from the occupying regime's government. After Poland gained its autonomy, general Kazimierz Porębski decided to form first institution that temporarily provided courses for new officers (pol. Tymczasowe Kursy Instruktorskie dla Oficerów (abbr. TIK)) in Toruń, Poland on March 20 of 1921. It was an 18-month-long course that was preparing officers of land forces for a service on board of battleships. Under the supervision of LCDR Adam Mohuczy in total the course was completed by 39 officers.

=== Naval Officers' School (1922) ===
Under the jurisdiction of then superintendent rear admiral Kazimierz Porębski on November 6 of 1922 the Naval Officers' School (pol. Oficerska Szkoła Marynarki Wojennej (abbr. OSMW)) was formed again in Toruń. This time the school consisted of 1 faculty and was meant to provide education ot its midshipmen in preparation for commissioning as officers of the Navy. The study period consisted of 2 years that later got extended to 3. During the study term, midshipmen were gaining experience on board of such battleships as OORP "Komendant Piłsudski" and "Generał Haller" during naval study tours.

Captains of Naval Officer's School

- Capt. LCDR Adam Mohuczy (October 1, 1922 – October 6, 1924)
- Capt. Witold Panasiewicz (October 6th1924 – October 15, 1925)
- Capt. Czesław Petelenz (October 15, 1925 – November 10, 1926)
- Capt. LCDR Stefan Frankowski (November 23, 1926 – October 18, 1928)

=== Naval Cadets' School (1928) ===
Novelization of training structure within Polish army caused a change in the name of Naval Officers' School into Naval Cadets' School (Szkoła Podchorążych Marynarki Wojennej (abbr. SPMW)) with majorly reorganized structure within the institution itself. At first it consisted of a formation of two separate faculties: Maritime and Technical. Practical courses were provided on board of battleships ORP "Iskra" and ORP "Wilia" respectively. Later, in 1935, there was created an additional faculty on Administration directed towards maritime administration. In 1938 the school was moved from Toruń to a nearby town of Bydgoszcz. Courses under the new structure were completed by 158 officers, 173 maritime graduates, 23 technical graduates and 12 administrative graduates. At the start of the Second World War in 1939 cadets and officers from Naval Cadets' School were taking an active part in county's defense, mainly in land formations. A month earlier, on August 24, some of the cadets, together with new candidates, who were receiving temporary training in Oksywie, Gdynia, were sent back to Bydgoszcz.

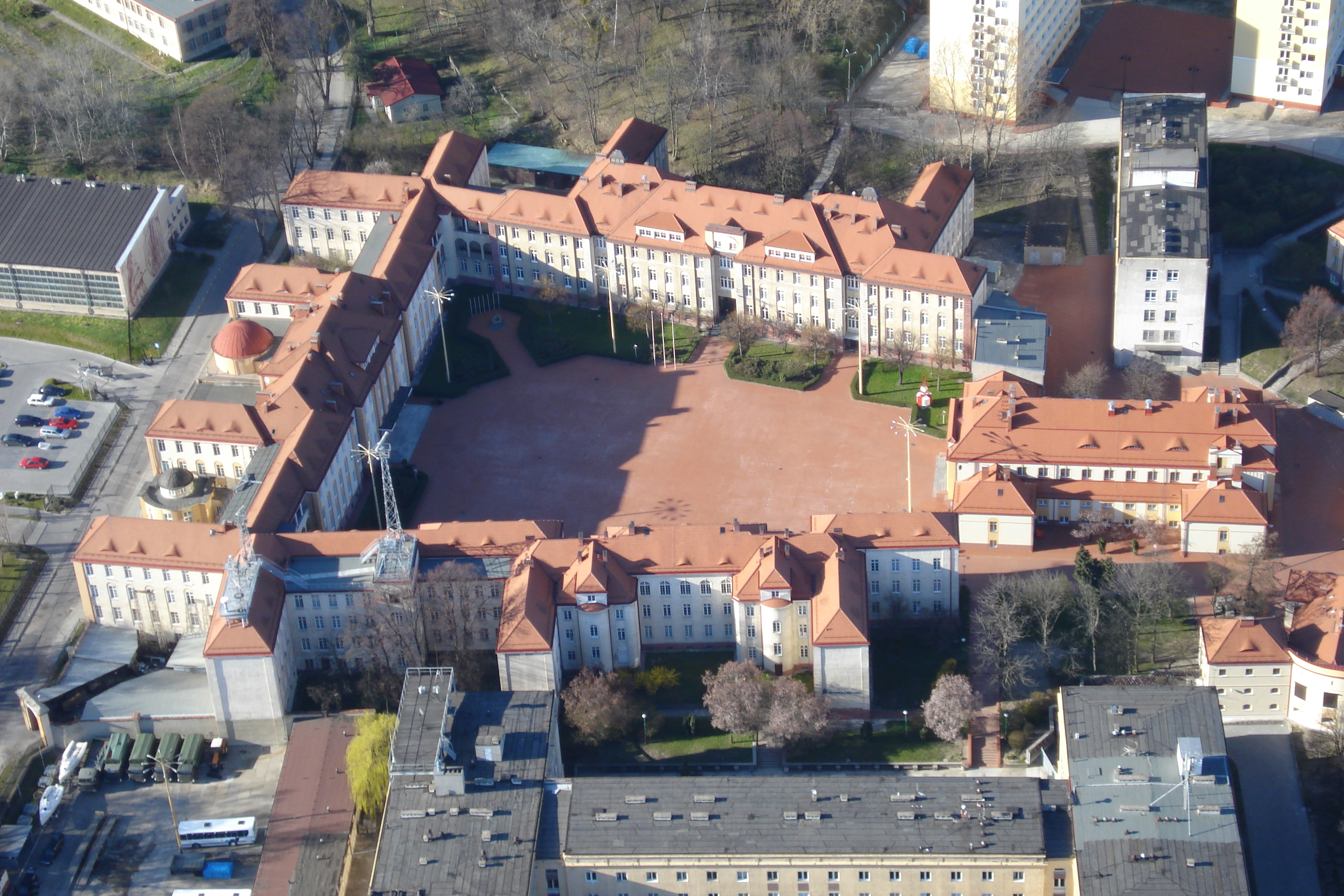
Aerial view

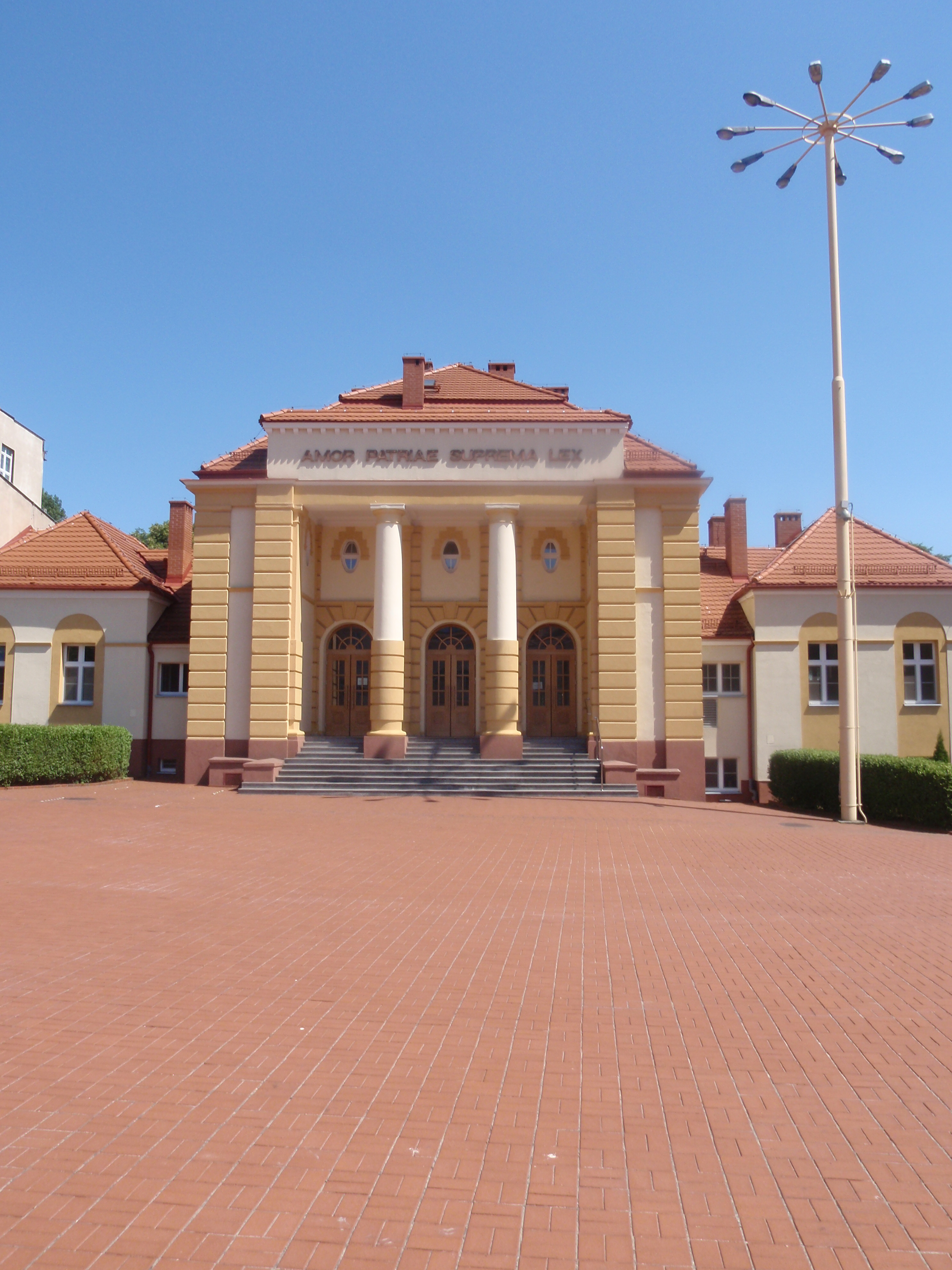
Building marked "AMOR PATRIAE SUPREMA LEX"

Supervisors of Naval Cadets' School in years 1928-1939

- Capt. Stefan Frankowski (October 19, 1928 – May 13, 1929)
- Capt. Jerzy Kłossowski (May 13, 1929 – May 23, 1929)
- Capt. First LCDR Karol Korytowski (May 23, 1929 – April 4, 1933)
- Capt. First LCDR Tadeusz Morgenstern-Podjazd (April 4, 1933 – October 10, 1937)
- Capt. First LCDR Tadeusz Stoklasa (October 10, 1937 – August 18, 1939)
- Capt. Tadeusz Morgenstern-Podjazd (August 18, 1939 – September 19, 1939).

=== Naval Cadets' School (1939) ===
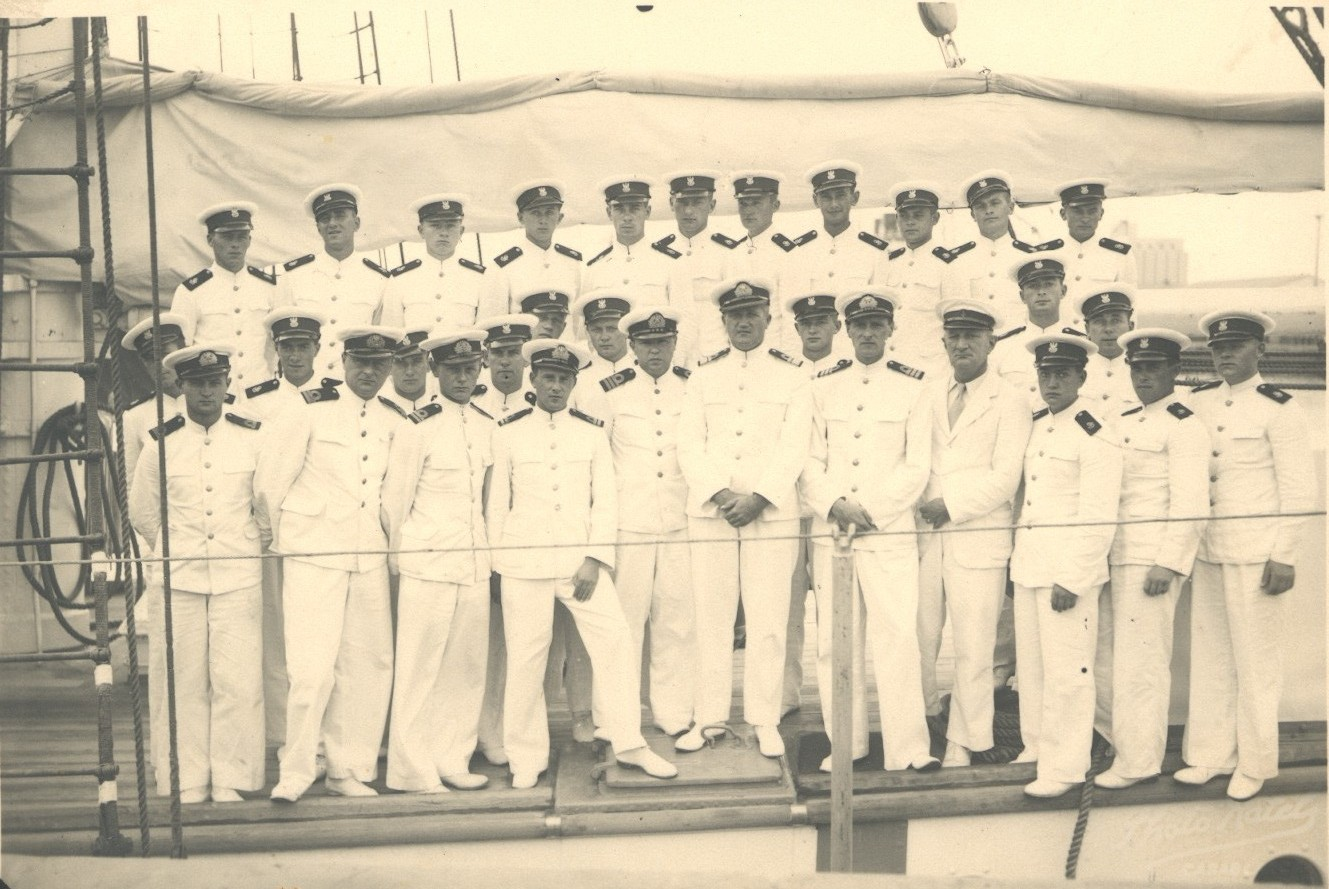
Cadets on board of ORP "Iskra", 1938

Under the jurisdiction of the Chief of the Polish Navy Capt. Jerzy Świrski Naval Cadets' School was revived, this time in Great Britain. The main reason why the revival was possible was the completion of the courses reached by remaining cadets and their successful transition from Poland to Great Britain. Later on new cadets were being also recruited among N.C.O.s and seamen. The training program did not change much, except now the practical part of the courses was held mostly on battleships of the Royal Navy. On September 17 of 1943 the Chief of the Polish Navy Capt. Jerzy Świrski created a new Reserve Naval Cadets' School (pol. Szkoła Podchorążych Rezerwy Marynarki Wojennej (abbr. SRRMW)), which shared its management with the Naval Cadets' School. The goal of that was to create a new cadre for Polish Navy that would be formed after the Second World War.

The exact location of Naval Cadets' School was on board of a Polish battleship ORP "Gdynia" and in a British harbor of Plymouth but in 1943 together with the new Reserve Naval Cadets' School it was moved to Bickleigh and Okehampton. On November 25 of 1946 both of the schools got cancelled under the jurisdiction of the Chief of the Polish Navy Capt. Jerzy Świrski. From 1939 to 1946 from Naval Cadets' School graduated: 53 naval second lieutenants from the Maritime faculty, 40 reserve naval second lieutenants from the Maritime faculty, 16 naval second lieutenants from the Technical faculty, 2 reserve naval second lieutenants from the Technical faculty, 5 naval second lieutenants from the Naval Officers' faculty and 9 reserve naval second lieutenants from the Naval Officers' faculty. The number of officers who graduated was 49.

Captains of Naval Cadets' School who had served in Great Britain

- Capt. First LCDR Ludwik Ziębicki (November 25, 1939 – January 18, 1940)
- Capt. Witold Zajączkowski (January 18, 1940 – October 18, 1940)
- Capt. First LCDR Włodzimierz Kodrębski (October 18, 1940 – October 5, 1941)
- Capt. Second LCDR Mirosław Kownacki (October 5, 1941 – March 20, 1942)
- Capt. Second LCDR Zbigniew Wojewódzki (March 20, 1942 – October 18, 1943)
- Capt. First LCDR Wojciech Francki (October 18, 1943 – August 28, 1945)
- Capt. Tadeusz Morgenstern-Podjazd (October 18, 1945 – November 25, 1946).

=== Naval Officers' School (1946) ===
On January 18, 1946, Polish People's Army's commander-in-chief marshal Michał Rola-Żymierski ordered a foundation of a military maritime training institution. Capt. Adam Mohuczy followed the order and was instructed to officially reform the Naval Officers' School (pol. Oficerska Szkoła Marynarki Wojennej (abbr. OSMW)) in Gdynia, Poland. It was planned to be a temporary solution before the proper training institution for the maritime officers would be formed. After the establishment of the Naval College the Naval Officers' School closed the applications for its new cadets and later on got closed.

First year of cadets completed the faculty in a 3-year system while in following years a 4-year bachelor system was implemented. Candidates who applied were required to have completed 4 years of high school with an order of honoring seamen, naval N.C.Os and land units' officers first. The Deck Faculty consisted of following cycles: general, political, vessel maneuver, sea strategies, sea knowledge, communication and radiolocation, sea practice. The Technical Faculty shared the general, political and sea practice subjects with addition of generally technical, electrical, electrotechnical and engine ones. At the end there were held exams and students were required to pass a thesis which was giving them specializations: Deck on the Deck Faculty and Steam, Internal Combustion or Electrical on the Technical Faculty. First practical classes were held on board of civil frigate "Dar Pomorza", later battleship ORP "Iskra" in 1948 and ORP "Zetempowiec" in 1951 were added. 500 officers graduated from the Officers' School with an officer's commission.

Supervisors of Naval Officers' School (1946-1958)

- Capt. Second LCDR Stanisław Mieszkowski (October 3, 1946 – March 5 marca 1947)
- Capt. First LCDR Adam Rychel (March 5, 1947 – April 4, 1948)
- Capt. Robert Satanowski (April 4, 1948 – October 7, 1949)
- Capt. Witold Rukiewicz (October 7, 1949 – November 5, 1951)
- Capt. First LCDR Tadeusz Makarewicz (November 5, 1951 – December 24, 1952)
- Capt. Mikołaj Rożkow (December 24, 1952 – September 13, 1954)
- Capt. Stanisław Leszczyński (September 13, 1954 – October 18, 1958).

Capt. Stanisław Mieszkowski and Capt. Adam Rychel were kept captive and tortured under the communist regime. Later Capt. Stanisław Mieszkowski was sentenced to death in 1952. His body was secretly buried in Powiązki Military Cemetery. In 2016 he was nominated by Polish President Andrzej Duda to the rank of rear admiral as a Cursed Soldier.

=== Polish Naval College (1955) ===
Naval College graduate badge (1970s)

On June 11 of a year 1955 the Naval Officers' School became the Polish Naval College (pol. Wyższa Szkoła Marynarki Wojennej, abbr. WSMW) which was an institution of higher education functioning like an academy. In 1956 the school's name was amended with the addition of the honorific "Heroes of Westerplatte". Initially the Naval College consisted of 4 faculties: navigation and sea communication, sea weaponry, technical and private. In 1956 the private faculty was closed and in 1957 other faculties got reorganized into Maritime Department and Technical Department.

The study programme for navigation and mechanical subjects was subtracted from similar courses held on other civilian universities, enriched with additional subjects on sea weaponry and army-oriented matter. Those who graduated were getting the title of engineers. Since 1955 students were also able to attend special officer and leadership courses to become a certificated officer. In 1959 first master's degree courses for Technical Department were open. In 1968 a Naval School of Ensigns (pol. Szkoła Chorążych Marynarki Wojennej) was founded and later the Naval College was providing doctor's degree programme for navigation and ship mechanics. Naval College had graduated approximately 2000 officers and 800 ensigns.

Commanders of Naval College

- Capt. Stanisław Leszczyński (June 11, 1955 – October 18, 1958).
- Capt. Second LCDR Tadeusz Makarewicz (October 18, 1958 – February 3, 1959)
- Capt. Kazimierz Podrucki (February 3, 1959 – January 21, 1966)
- RDML MS Gereon Grzenia-Romanowski (January 21, 1966 – March 14, 1969)
- RDML MS Henryk Pietraszkiewicz (March 14, 1969 – December 1, 1969)
- Capt. doc. ENGR Edward Łączny (December 1, 1969 – February 27, 1971)
- RDML doc. Witold Gliński (February 27, 1971 – October 18, 1983)
- Capt. doc. Jerzy Apanowicz (October 18, 1983 – July 17, 1987)

=== Polish Naval Academy (1987) ===
On July 17 of the year 1987 the government of Polish People's Republic decided to reevaluate the Naval College to become first Polish Naval Academy (pol. Akademia Marynarki Wojennej, abbr. AMW). This way the name of the institution has gotten relevant with its internal structure. At the end of the 90's its military department was introduced with master's degree courses and new civil faculties. They consisted of mechanical faculty, international relations faculty and pedagogical faculty. In the year of 2000 the Leadership Institute was developed into lately the Department of Naval Strategy Management and then into the Department of Naval Operational Art and Naval Military Tactics which was enabled to honor its graduates with titles on military science. In 2002 the Naval School of Ensigns got closed. Next step was forming the Institute of Humanities and Social Sciences which in 2006 was transformed into a separate department. Until the year of 2006 the number of academy graduates reached approximately 600 officers and 300 ensigns.

From the year of 2015 the academy has been proceeding on internationalizing and has welcomed students and tutors from such countries as Qatar and Kuwait and from 2016 Saudi Arabia.

During the cadence of Defense Minister Antoni Macierewicz the position of sessional instructor was made vacant from Admiral Ryszard Łukasik, Vice Admiral Henryk Sołkiewicz and Rear Admiral Zbigniew Badeński.

Commanders of Polish Naval Academy

- Capt. doc. Jerzy Apanowicz (July 17, 1987 – November 10, 1988)
- RDML Kazimierz Bossy (November 10, 1988 – February 5, 1993)
- RDML Henryk Matuszczyk (February 5, 1993 – October 3, 1994)
- RDML prof. Antoni Komorowski (October 3, 1994 – 2003)
- RDML prof. Zygmunt Kitowski (November 17, 2003 – April 26, 2007)
- RDML doc. Czesław Dyrcz (April 26, 2007 – January 23, 2015)
- RDML prof. Tomasz Szubrycht (from January 23, 2015)

== Structure and scientific activity ==
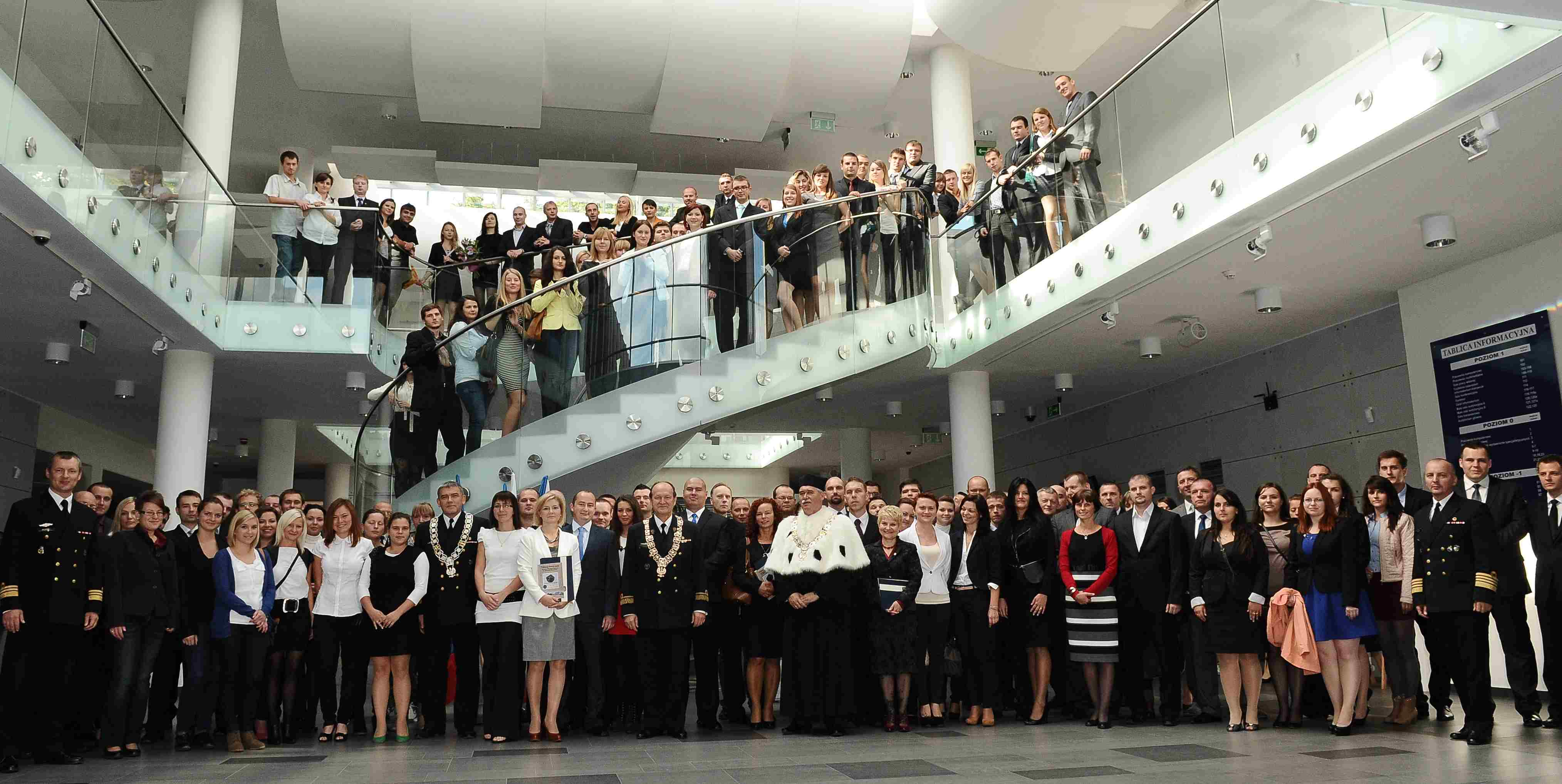
Faculty of Command and Naval Operations

The PNA is a naval university of a settled position in the Polish higher educational system. The mission of the PNA is to create conditions necessary to provide security for the Poland at sea through disseminating knowledge, conducting research work, educating and developing officer-cadets and civilian students, as well as perfecting professional military, and civilian workers, in the administration and maritime industry. The Academy co-operates with technical and military Polish and European universities, enterprises and international organizations. University authorities:

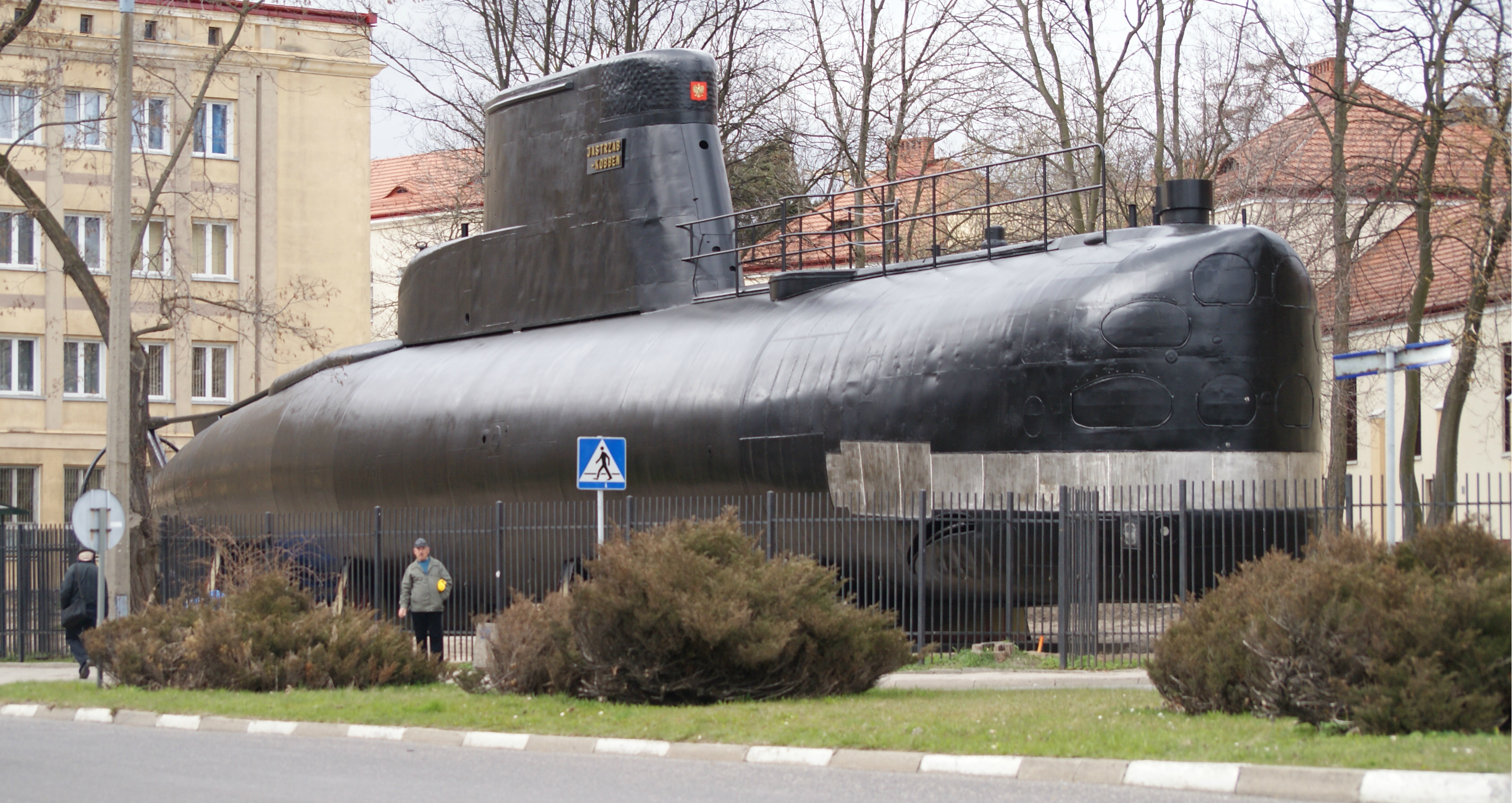
Kobben-class submarine „Jastrząb” in front of the PNA

- Rector-Commandant - Capt. prof. Tomasz Szubrycht,
- Deputy Commandant - Capt. Mariusz Mięsikowski D.Sc.Eng,
- Vice- Rector for Education - Capt. Dariusz Bugajski Ph.D., D.Sc.,
- Vice- Rector for Science - Capt. Tomasz Kniaziewicz Ph.D., D.Sc,
- Chancellor - Bogusław Bąk D.Sc. Eng.

The PNA educates the officers of navy and civilian specialists on four faculties:

- the Faculty of Navigation and Naval Weapons,
- the Faculty of Mechanical and Electrical Engineering,
- the Faculty of Command and Naval Operations, and
- the Faculty of Humanities and Social Sciences.

The major part of the activity of the Polish Naval Academy is conducting the research in the following areas:

- naval strategy;
- naval operational art and naval military tactics;
- international law and international security;
- law of the sea;
- maritime navigation and hydrography;
- navigation automation and integration;
- modern deep-sea and diving techniques;
- material engineering and shock resistance of ship structures;
- automation of shipboard command control systems;
- anti-submarine weapons;
- physical fields and echo ranging;
- electronic warfare and ship antimissile defense;
- exploitation of ship, weapons and shipboard systems;
- operational and tactical employment of maritime rescue forces.

== Civilian studies ==
The university offers both undergraduate and 28 post-graduate courses in the Polish and English language. The PNA offers courses which focus on practical skills and competence. The PNA students acquire both, practical and social skills with the aid of a broad range of simulators, training simulators, multimedia rooms, and dedicated training courses developed in collaboration with a career adviser and the Academic Career Office. Some of their offered courses are:

- Homeland Security,
- International Relations,
- Maritime Security,
- National Security,
- Hydrography and Navigation,
- Automatics and Robotics,
- Mechanical Engineering and Machine Building,
- Mechatronics,
- Military Pedagogy,
- Information Systems in Security,
- Space and Satellite Technologies (intercollegiate course run in cooperation of Gdańsk University of Technology and Maritime Academy of Gdynia).

The PNA provides the opportunity to obtain a doctoral degree (including attendance in doctoral studies) in the field of:

- Technical sciences (geodesy and cartography),
- Technical sciences (construction and exploitation of machinery),
- Social sciences in the area of security science (military science).

== Military studies and the recruitment process ==
Military studies are conducted in five areas of study:

- Navigation,
- Informatics,
- Mechanical Engineering,
- Mechatronics,
- Information Systems in Security.

Attending professional defense programs students are trained to serve as commissioned officers in the Polish Armed Forces, mostly in the Navy. The recruitment process for military studies is in the form of competition. In addition to the results obtained on the end-of high school examinations, physical fitness test results as well as interviews are taken into account.
