= Polish Supplementary School Council of America =

Polish-American educational organization

- Centrala Polskich Szkół Dokształcających w Ameryce
- Formation: 1925
- Founder: Wacław Bojan-Błażewicz
- Type: Educational nonprofit
- Headquarters: New York, United States
- Region served: United States (primarily East Coast)
- Official language: Polish
- President: Dorota Andraka
- Website: Official website

The Polish Supplementary School Council of America (Polish: Centrala Polskich Szkół Dokształcających w Ameryce) is a Polish-American educational organization founded in 1925 by Wacław Bojan-Błażewicz, with the support of Polish-American community leaders and editors of the Nowy Świat newspaper. The Council was created in response to American laws in the 1920s that restricted bilingual parish education, aiming to sustain "nurturing the Polish language and Catholic values" among Polish immigrants.

From its inception, the Council coordinated weekend Polish-language schools, known as "Saturday schools" (szkoły sobotnie), across multiple states, including New York, New Jersey, Connecticut, Massachusetts, Rhode Island, Pennsylvania, Maryland, Virginia, and Florida. Early Council programs emphasized Polish language, literature, history, geography, religious education, and folk traditions. Teachers were often sponsored by the Polish Ministry of Education and specialized textbooks were imported from Poland.

Despite disruptions during World War II, the Council helped reestablish Polish schools to accommodate new waves of post-war Polish immigrants. In the 1950s and 1960s, the Council organized systematic teacher training seminars and published methodological guidelines. A major milestone was reached in 1962 when the Council formalized its structure during a general assembly in New York.

== Organization and leadership ==
The Polish Supplementary School Council of America is officially incorporated as a nonprofit based in New York. As of 2024, it oversees approximately 75 member schools, educating over 9,500 students, with the involvement of over 800 teachers.

Since 2005, the president of the Polish Supplementary School Council of America has been Dorota Andraka, who previously served as deputy president beginning in 2003.

== Activities and programs ==
The Polish Supplementary School Council of America engages in a wide range of educational, cultural, and organizational activities designed to serve the needs of Polish-American students, educators, and communities. Founded to fill the void left by the liquidation of bilingual ethnic schools, the Council has acted as a Polish school board across states such as New York, New Jersey, Connecticut, Massachusetts, Rhode Island, Pennsylvania, Maryland, Virginia, Florida, and more recently Texas and Arizona. The Polish Supplementary School Council of America supports Polish language education and cultural identity among Polish-Americans through a wide range of programs.

=== Educational conferences and teacher training ===
The Polish Supplementary School Council of America organizes regular methodological training for both teachers and school directors. These include annual conferences, leadership sessions, and continuing education seminars. In cooperation with institutions such as the Maria Curie-Skłodowska University in Lublin, Jagiellonian University, the University of Warsaw, and the University of Silesia, training workshops are offered both online and in-person. The Council also operates a Local Methodological Center (LOM), opened in 2018 at the Consulate General of the Republic of Poland in New York, to integrate and support teacher development initiatives.

In 2008, postgraduate studies in Teaching Polish as a Foreign Language were launched in partnership with the Maria Skłodowska-Curie University, resulting in the graduation of 56 teachers, many of whom are now certified Polish language examiners. The Polish Supplementary School Council of America organizes regular methodological training for both teachers and school directors. These sessions focus on modern pedagogy, bilingual education, and curriculum development, and are often held in collaboration with educational experts from Poland and the United States. Directors and administrators also receive separate administrative and leadership training sessions aimed at improving school management, teacher evaluation, and communication with Polish-American families. Training events are conducted online and in-person, particularly at annual gatherings.

The Council organizes the annual Zjazd Nauczycieli Polonijnych i Komitetów Rodzicielskich (Convention of Polish Teachers and Parental Committees), as well as conferences such as the 2025 session on "Artificial Intelligence and the Future of the Language" held at the Consulate General of the Republic of Poland in New York City.

=== Cultural festivals and competitions ===
To cultivate Polish language, history, and cultural identity, the Council organizes various contests and initiatives for youth. These include literature, science, and cultural knowledge competitions, later transformed into the Festival of Polish Schools Abroad, an inclusive event that showcases student talents while emphasizing values and tradition over competition. The Council also facilitates participation in the International Competition of Children’s and Youth’s Literary Creativity, with finals held at the Polish Consulate in New York. Prominent Polish authors and artists, including Wanda Chotomska and Grzegorz Kasdepke, have attended these events.

In collaboration with foundations like Linguae Mundi and the Foundation for the Support and Development of Polish Schools, the Council has sponsored youth educational camps in Poland, such as "In the Footsteps of Copernicus" (2017–2018), co-funded by the Polish Ministry of Foreign Affairs and the Ministry of National Education. Each year, the Polish Supplementary School Council of America organizes the Polish Schools Festival (Festiwal Szkół Polonijnych), featuring cultural performances, contests, and exhibitions. Schools also participate in international competitions such as Być Polakiem and collaborate with the Institute of National Remembrance.

=== Cooperation and partnerships ===
In addition to a longstanding partnership with the Polish & Slavic Federal Credit Union, of which it is a sponsoring organization, the Council works closely with the Józef Piłsudski Institute of America, the Consulate General of the Republic of Poland in New York, and the Polish Community Association. The Polish Supplementary School Council of America also maintains partnerships with the Maksymilian Kolbe Institute and the Polish American Congress. The organization also cooperates with leading Polish universities including the University of Warsaw, Jagiellonian University, and Maria Curie-Skłodowska University.

The Council collaborates with the Polish Youth Association, participating in youth leadership and education-oriented networking sessions.

=== Foundation and certification initiatives ===
The Council maintains a foundation in Poland and has taken steps to formalize and enhance its certification programs. Since 2004, it has administered the Polish Regent/LOTE (Languages Other Than English) exam, enabling American high school students to earn credit for their knowledge of Polish. The Council also became an officially authorized Polish language certification center in 2016 by decision of the Polish Ministry of Science and Higher Education, reinstating exams for Polish as a Foreign Language for diaspora students. The Council operates a foundation in Poland to support educational initiatives and scholarships for students. Following the 2024 floods in Poland, the Council coordinated humanitarian fundraising efforts.

The Council publishes a quarterly magazine titled Asystent, which serves as a professional resource for educators, a platform for community voices, and a showcase for student and teacher achievements. Contributions from noted Polish writers, educators, and amateur journalists across the diaspora are featured.

== Recognitions ==
The Polish Supplementary School Council of America and its leaders have received numerous honors, including the King Jan III Sobieski Award from the Nowodworski Foundation for exceptional contributions to Polish-language education. Teachers and board members associated with the Council have also been awarded the prestigious Medal of the Commission of National Education (Polish: Medal Komisji Edukacji Narodowej) by the Ministry of National Education of Poland in recognition of their commitment to diaspora education and Polish language instruction

== See also ==
- Polish American Congress
- Polish diaspora
- Polish Youth Association
