= International Society for Military Law and the Law of War =

International non-profit-making association

The International Society for Military Law and the Law of War (French: Société Internationale de Droit Militaire et de Droit de la Guerre) is an international non-profit-making association (AISBL) under Belgian law. The society has its seat (as well as its secretariat) in Brussels since 1988, when it was created to succeed an international society with the same name established in Strasbourg in 1956.

== Mission ==
The International Society for Military Law and the Law of War aims at studying and disseminating the law of war and international humanitarian law. To do so, the Society regularly organizes different kinds of events as seminars, expert meetings and congresses. The Society is an international non-profit organization under Belgian law, created in 1988 and seated in Brussels, taking over an international society of the same name that was located in Strasbourg.

The society has around 750 members from all over the globe. Members originate from the academic and professional world. The society regroups 22 national groups, such as the Belgian and German groups. In 1997, the society obtained consultative status to the United Nations.

== Publications ==
The society has three publications: the Military Law and the Law of War Review, the Recueils of the International Society for Military Law and the Law of War, and the society's News Flash.

=== Military Law and the Law of War Review ===
The Military Law and the Law of War Review is a juridical periodical that comes out 4 times a year. This review covers matters of interest to military lawyers and academics in the field of international humanitarian law. The Review publishes works in English, Dutch, French and German, is edited by the Belgian Society for Military Law and the Law of War and is supported by the Belgian Defense.

The Table of content of the last edition is freely accessible on the site of the society.

=== Recueils of the International Society for Military Law and the Law of War ===
The Recueils contain the proceedings of the tri-annual congresses of the society.

=== News Flash ===
The society's News Flash covers the recent international news and developments in the field of international humanitarian law. It is published multiple times a year, mostly during the summer months.
