= Polish & Slavic Federal Credit Union =

Ethnic credit union headquartered in Brooklyn, New York

- Formerly: Industrial and Commercial Federal Credit Union
- Type: Credit union
- Industry: Financial services
- Founded: 1976
- Headquarters: 100 McGuinness Blvd, Brooklyn, NY 11222
- Number of locations: 22
- Area served: Connecticut, Illinois, New York, New Jersey, Pennsylvania, Florida, Indiana
- Key people: Krzysztof Matyszczyk, Chairman; Bogdan Chmielewski, CEO
- Products: Savings, checking, consumer loans, mortgages, credit cards, investments, online banking
- Total assets: $2.65 billion (2025) ▲$2.035 billion (2019) ▲$1.920 billion (2018)▲$1.840 billion (2017)▲
- Members: 123,466 (March 2025)
- Website: https://en.psfcu.com/

Polish & Slavic Federal Credit Union (PSFCU) (Polish: Polsko-Słowiańska Federalna Unia Kredytowa) is a federally insured, federally-chartered, credit union with over 123,000 members. PSFCU operates 22 branches in New York, New Jersey, Illinois, Pennsylvania, Connecticut, Florida, and Indiana. It is the largest ethnic credit union in the United States.

== History ==
The Polish & Slavic Federal Credit Union was chartered in 1976 by Rev. Longin Tolczyk and members of the Polish & Slavic Center. Its mission was to help immigrants—particularly Polish-Americans—who were underserved by traditional financial institutions. Originally named the Industrial and Commercial Federal Credit Union, it was renamed in 1979 to better reflect its cultural and community focus.

The first office opened at 940 Manhattan Avenue in Greenpoint, Brooklyn. In 1981, PSFCU moved its headquarters to 140 Greenpoint Avenue. In 1987 the first branch of the PSFCU opened in Union, New Jersey.

Over the next several decades, the credit union embarked on a phase of rapid expansion. In 2004, PSFCU opened a new branch in Clifton, New Jersey, to meet growing demand. In 2007, it expanded into Pennsylvania, placing an ATM at the National Shrine of Our Lady of Czestochowa in Doylestown. The Illinois market followed in 2010, with the launch of branches in Norridge, Mount Prospect, Bridgeview, and Schaumburg. The Wallington, New Jersey, branch opened in 2015, followed by the Greenpoint II branch in Brooklyn in 2017.

In 2019, PSFCU launched its first full-service Pennsylvania location in Stroudsburg. Further expansion continued with the opening of a branch in Algonquin, Illinois, in 2023, and in Clearwater, Florida, in 2024. PSFCU also began offering mortgage services in Indiana that same year. As of 2025, the credit union continues to grow its presence in states with large or emerging Polish-American communities.

== Membership ==
Anyone can become a member of the PSFCU by joining a designated sponsoring organization, such as the Polish & Slavic Center, Polonia of Long Island, Polish Supplementary School Council of America, General Pulaski Memorial Parade Committee, Alliance of Polish Clubs, Polish Highlanders Alliance of North America, Kosciuszko Foundation, Copernicus Foundation, or Polish Army Veterans Association of America.

Membership is open to all regardless of ethnicity. Previously, only persons of Polish or Slavic descent could become a member of the federal credit union, however that rule has since been changed and membership is open to all persons willing to join, regardless of ethnicity.

As of March 2025, the Polish & Slavic Federal Credit Union served 123,466 members across seven U.S. states.

== Services ==
The Polish & Slavic Federal Credit Union offers these services:

- Checking accounts and related, including debit cards
- Savings account
- Certificates of deposit
- IRAs
- Consumer loans of all kinds
  - Lines of credit (LOC)
  - Credit cards
  - Auto loans: Car loans, motorcycle loans, etc.
  - Home equity loans and Home equity lines of credit
- Mortgages
- Federally insured student loans
- Direct deposit
- Home banking – initially offered in 2007

== Statistics ==
PSFCU statistics as of December 2025:
Statistic	Value
Assets	$ 2,731,856,592
Loans	$ 1,602,514,198
Investments	$ 1,031,999,651
Members' Shares	$ 2,485,169,792
Net Worth	$ 300,409,749
Net Worth to Assets	11.00%
Year-to-Date Net Income	$ 22,913,395
Number of Members	126,023

== Community engagement ==
The PSFCU is a leading supporter of Polish-American institutions and initiatives. In 2023 alone, the credit union contributed more than $3.5 million to community causes, including Polish-language schools, cultural festivals, nonprofit organizations, veterans' associations, and religious institutions.

The credit union is the primary financial sponsor of the annual Pulaski Day Parade in New York City and has consistently funded Polish-language media outlets across the United States. In 2024, the PSFCU sponsored events including the May 3rd Constitution Day Parade in Chicago and the Flag and Polonia Day celebration in New York City. It also supports historical essay contests such as "My Hero from Monte Cassino," promoting awareness of Polish military history among youth.

=== Scholarship initiatives ===
Since the creation of its scholarship fund in 2007, the PSFCU has awarded over $7 million in academic scholarships to more than 5,000 high school and college students. The program is open to members of the credit union and has expanded annually, awarding over $500,000 in 2023 alone.

== Leadership ==
The PSFCU is governed by a Board of Directors elected from among its membership. As of 2025, the Chairman of the Board is Krzysztof Matyszczyk, a longtime community leader and founder of the Brooklyn-based Fidelity Tax & Insurance Brokerage Corporation.

The day-to-day operations of the credit union are overseen by Chief Executive Officer Bogdan Chmielewski, who has held the position since 2006. Under Chmielewski’s leadership, PSFCU has doubled its assets, expanded its footprint nationally, and strengthened its role in the Polish-American community.

== Awards and recognitions ==
In recognition of its contributions to the Polish-American community, the Polish & Slavic Federal Credit Union has received several honors from cultural and civic organizations.

In 2023, PSFCU was awarded the Medal of Merit by the Alliance of Polish Clubs during its 95th anniversary celebration in Chicago. The honor acknowledged the credit union's long-standing commitment to supporting Polish-American institutions and cultural heritage, particularly following the expansion of PSFCU branches throughout the Chicagoland area since 2010.

Also in 2023, PSFCU CEO Bogdan Chmielewski received the Ignacy Paderewski Medal for distinguished service to the Polish-American community and for promoting Polish cultural identity abroad. The award was presented during a public ceremony at the National Shrine of Our Lady of Czestochowa in Doylestown, Pennsylvania.

In 2024, the Polish Youth Association awarded the PSFCU the Medal for Merits to the Youth during its five-year anniversary gala held at the Consulate General of Poland in New York. The award was presented in recognition of PSFCU's enduring support for youth education, scholarships, and exchange programs benefiting the Polish diaspora.
