= Adam Mohuczy =

Polish Navy officer

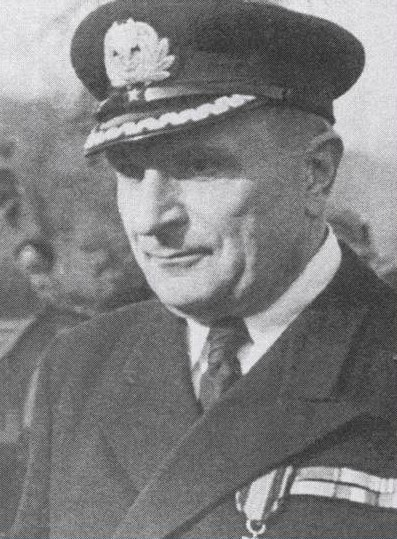
- Adam Mohuczy
- Born: March 7, 1891
- Died: 1953 (aged 61–62)
- Education: École de Guerre Navale
- Military career
- Allegiance: Poland
- Branch: Navy
- Rank: Rear Admiral
- Commands: Chief of Staff and Commander of the Polish Navy
- Awards: Virtuti Militari

Adam Mohuczy (1891–1953) was a Polish Navy officer. Captain of several ships and squadrons, Counter Admiral from 1946 and Chief of Staff and Commander of the Polish Navy from 1945 to 1947. In 1949 arrested by Polish secret police, accused of sabotage, tortured. He died in prison in 1953. In 1957 he was posthumously rehabilitated.

== Biography ==
Adam was born on 7 March 1891 in Vitebsk, Russian Empire. He enlisted in the Russian Navy to become a military officer, finishing the Naval Corps School in Saint Petersburg in 1911.

From 1912 to 1916 he served aboard a training ship, armored cruiser General-Admiral class Gerzog Edinburgski, next, armoured cruiser, Rossiya, battleship Tsarievitch, and submarines Akula, Bars and S-12. Later he was an instructor in Mykolaiv Naval Academy. In 1917 he took a course of underwater swimming.

In the aftermath of the First World War, Poland regained independence. Adam Mohuczy joined the Polish Navy; first he served in the organizational structures in Warsaw and Toruń.

He studied and graduated from École de Guerre Navale in Paris in 1926.

During the Invasion of Poland he participated in the defense of Hel. On the night of 1 to 2 October he made an unsuccessful attempt to escape to Sweden on the fishing cutter Hel-117. In the years 1939–1945 he was in German captivity in Oflag XVIII A Lienz and II C Woldenberg.

After liberation and return to Poland he was the head of the Department of Shipping and Harbours in the Chamber of Industry and Trade. In 1945 he was called up for active service as the director of science of the Naval Officers' School and temporarily as acting deputy chief of the Navy's Main Staff. Then he was deputy chief of the Main Staff and chief of the Navy's Main Staff. By order of the Supreme Command of the Polish Armed Forces on 1 January 1946 he took over the position of commander of the Gdynia garrison and acting commander of the Navy. By resolution of the Presidium of the Polish State National Council of 1 March 1946 he was appointed rear admiral. In 1947 he became president of the Main Council of the Maritime League. He retired in 1948.

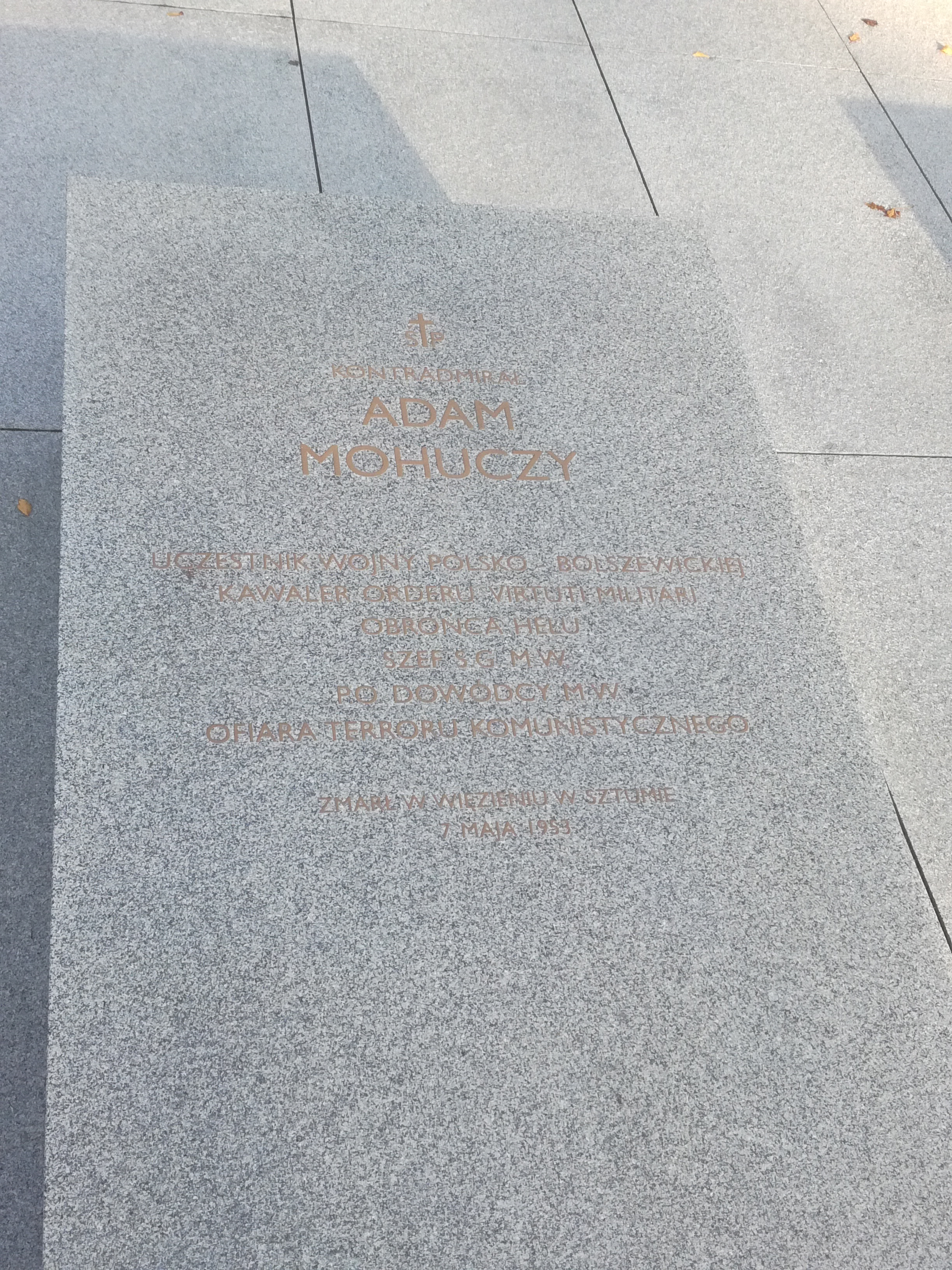
The grave of Rear Adm. Adam Mohuczy at the Navy Cemetery in Gdynia

At the end of 1949 he was arrested by Main Directorate of Information of the Polish Army and placed in the Military Information buildings in Gdynia, where he was tortured. In 1950 he was sentenced by the Supreme Military Court to 13 years in prison on false charges of sabotage. He died in prison in Sztum.

== Awards and decorations ==
- Silver Cross of Virtuti Militari (1921)
- Order of the Cross of Grunwald, 3rd Class (16 July 1946)
- Silver Cross of Merit (2 March 1935)
- Medal of the 10th Anniversary of Independence
- Medal for Oder, Neisse and Baltic
- Medal of Victory and Freedom 1945
