= Medal of the Commission of National Education =

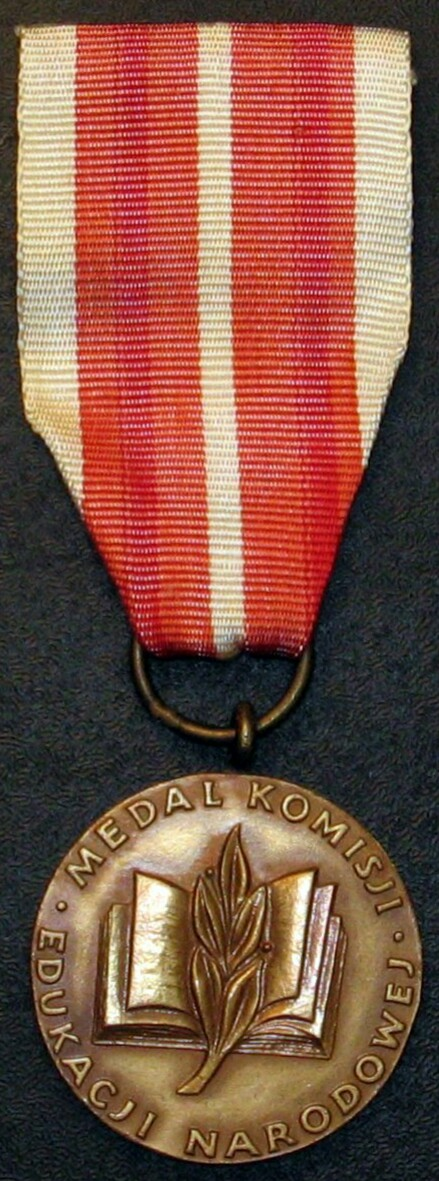
- Type: Ministerial decoration
- Awarded for: Outstanding contributions to education and upbringing
- Country: Poland
- Eligibility: Polish citizens and foreigners
- Ribbon: Medal of the National Education Commission
- Status: Currently awarded
- Established: 27 April 1956

The Medal of the Commission of National Education (Polish: Medal Komisji Edukacji Narodowej, abbreviated as Medal KEN) is a Polish ministerial decoration awarded for exceptional contributions to education and pedagogy. It is conferred by the Minister of National Education.

The medal is named after the Commission of National Education (Polish: Komisja Edukacji Narodowej), the first central authority of public education in Poland and Europe, established by the Sejm of the Polish–Lithuanian Commonwealth on 14 October 1773 at the initiative of King Stanisław August Poniatowski.

== History ==
The medal was established by the Act of 27 April 1956 on the rights and duties of teachers, which provided for its award to "individuals distinguished in education and upbringing, particularly in the areas of literature, pedagogical sciences, curricula, textbooks, and educational aids". It was later incorporated into the Act of 26 January 1982—the Teacher's Charter (Karta Nauczyciela)—which maintains its role as a state distinction for contributions to education.

The criteria and procedures for awarding the medal have evolved through regulations issued in 1967, 1982, and 1991, with the current legal basis provided by the Regulation of the Minister of National Education dated 20 September 2000.

As of 16 April 2010, the medal can also be awarded posthumously.

== Criteria ==
The medal is awarded for significant achievements in education and pedagogy, including:

- Authors of outstanding pedagogical works, innovative textbooks, and educational aids;
- Teachers with at least seven years of distinguished service in teaching, mentoring, or caregiving, especially those implementing novel educational methods;
- Creators of literary, popular-scientific, artistic, film, television, and radio works that provide valuable educational and moral guidance for children and youth;
- Academic instructors with notable contributions to educational science;
- Social and union activists, benefactors, and others contributing significantly to educational development;
- Supervisory staff and consultants excelling in professional teacher development;
- Polish citizens abroad and foreign nationals promoting Polish education and fostering international educational cooperation;
- Other individuals with recognized achievements in the field of education and upbringing.

The Minister of National Education grants the medal either on their own initiative or based on recommendations from other institutions. Recipients are presented with a medal and an official certificate. Until 2000, the minister could revoke the medal if awarded based on falsified documentation or if the recipient's conduct rendered them unworthy of the distinction.

== Design ==
The medal is a 36 mm diameter round piece made of light brown metal. The obverse features an open book and a laurel branch, with the inscription "MEDAL KOMISJI EDUKACJI NARODOWEJ" around the rim. The reverse displays the inscription "RZECZPOSPOLITA POLSKA" with laurel branches above and below. Before 1991, the reverse read "POLSKA RZECZPOSPOLITA LUDOWA."

The medal is suspended from a 35 mm wide red ribbon with three vertical white stripes—two outer stripes 5 mm wide and a central stripe 2 mm wide. It is worn on the left side of the chest, following national orders and other state decorations in precedence.

== See also ==
- Commission of National Education
- Orders, decorations, and medals of Poland

== Sources ==
- "Ustawa z dnia 27 kwietnia 1956 r. o prawach i obowiązkach nauczycieli" (Official Journal of Laws 1956 No. 12 item 63).
- "Ustawa z dnia 26 stycznia 1982 r. - Karta Nauczyciela" (Official Journal of Laws 1982 No. 3 item 19).
- "Rozporządzenie Ministra Edukacji Narodowej z dnia 20 września 2000 r." (Official Journal of Laws 2000 No. 99 item 1073).
- "Rozporządzenie Ministra Edukacji Narodowej z dnia 16 kwietnia 2010 r." (Official Journal of Laws 2010 No. 63 item 392).
- Andrzej Nowak, "Dzieje Polski," Wydawnictwo Biały Kruk, 2019.
