= Tomasz Piotrowski =

Polish general

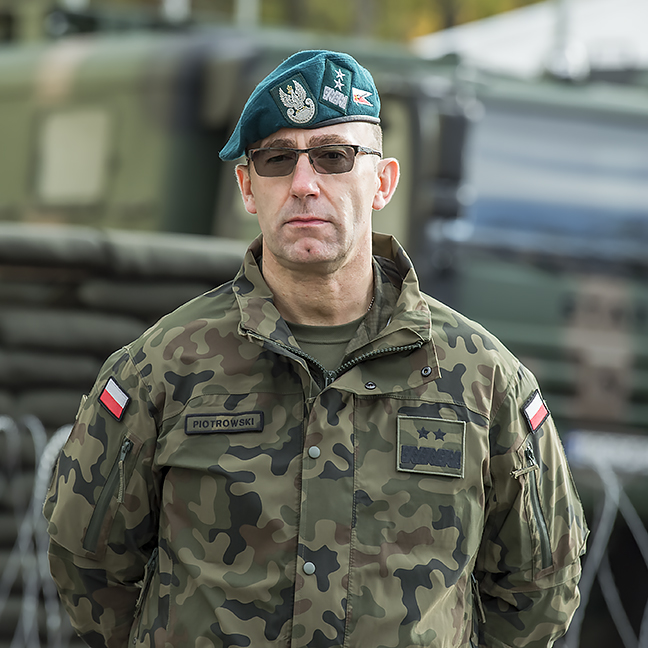
- Piotrowski in 2018
- Born: 14 July 1968 (age 58); Chełmża, Polish People's Republic
- Military career
- Allegiance: Polish People's Republic (1987–1989); Poland (1989–2024)
- Branch: Polish People's Army (1987–1989); Polish Land Forces (1989–2024)
- Service years: 1987–2024
- Rank: Generał broni (Lieutenant general) reserve
- Conflicts: International Security Assistance Force in Afghanistan

Generał broni Tomasz Krzysztof Piotrowski (born 14 July 1968 in Chełmża) is a Polish general and was the Operational Commander of the Armed Forces from 2018 to 2023.

== Education ==
Tomasz Piotrowski graduated from the General J. Bem Military Academy of Rocket and Artillery in Toruń (1991). He also studied at the National Defence University of Warsaw: higher command and staff studies in the organization and management of military command at the Faculty of Land Forces (1998–2000); postgraduate studies in Information Security (2004); postgraduate studies in operational and strategic studies (2007–2008); postgraduate studies in defense policy (2013–2014).

== Military service record ==
- Platoon commander in the 36th Mechanized Regiment of the Academic Legion (1991–1992)
- Platoon commander of the 32nd Mechanized Regiment (1992–1994)
- Platoon commander in the 8th Mechanized Brigade (1994–1996)
- Commander of the support company in the 8th Mechanized Brigade (1996–1998)
- Fire Division Commander of the 4th Mixed Artillery Regiment (2000–2001)
- Regimental Chief of Staff of the 16th Artillery Regiment (2001–2004)
- Deputy Regimental Commander of the 16th Artillery Regiment (2004–2007)
- Commander of the 2nd Artillery Regiment (2008–2010)
- Head of the Missile and Artillery Division in the Command of the 12th Mechanised Division (2010–2014)
- Deputy Commander of the Polish Military Contingent in the Islamic Republic of Afghanistan (2012–2013)
- Deputy Chief of Staff for Operations at the Command of the 1st 2nd Mechanised Division (2015–2016)
- Deputy Division Commander – Chief of Staff of the 12th Mechanised Division (2016–2017)
- Chief of Staff of the Operational Command of the Armed Forces (2017–2018)
- Operational Commander of the Armed Forces (2018–2023)
- Instruction of the Director of the Human Resources Department - SGWP (2023–2024)
- End of professional military service on 31 January 2024

== Rank promotions ==
- Podporucznik (Second lieutenant) – 1991
- Porucznik (Lieutenant) – 1994
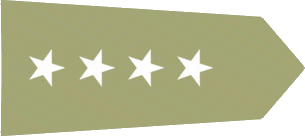
- Kapitan (Captain) – 1998
- Major – 2002
- Podpułkownik (Lieutenant colonel) – 2004
- Pułkownik (Colonel) – 2008
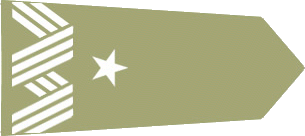
- Generał brygady (Brigadier general) – 2016
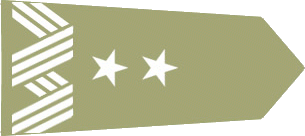
- Generał dywizji (Major general) – 2018
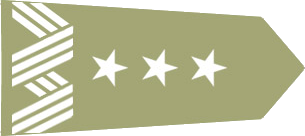
- Generał broni (Lieutenant general) – 2020

== Decorations and medals ==
- Knight's Cross of the Order of Polonia Restituta (2021)
- Military Cross of Merit with Swords
- Star of Afghanistan
- Golden Medal of the Armed Forces in the Service of the Fatherland
- Silver Medal of the Armed Forces in the Service of the Fatherland
- Bronze Medal of the Armed Forces in the Service of the Fatherland
- Golden Medal of Merit for National Defence
- Silver Medal of Merit for National Defence
- Bronze Medal of Merit for National Defence
- Pro Memoria Medal
- Commemorative badge "Medal of the 100th Anniversary of the Establishment of the General Staff of the Polish Army"
- Medal "In the Service of God and Country"
- Bronze Star Medal (United States)
- NATO Medal for the International Security Assistance Force mission in Afghanistan
- Honorary Badge of the Land Forces
- Commemorative badge of the 12th Mechanized Division
- Armed Forces Operational Command commemorative badge
- Badge of a graduate of the Postgraduate Operational and Strategic Studies at the National Defence University of Warsaw
