= 6th Airborne Brigade =

- 6 Brygada Powietrznodesantowa
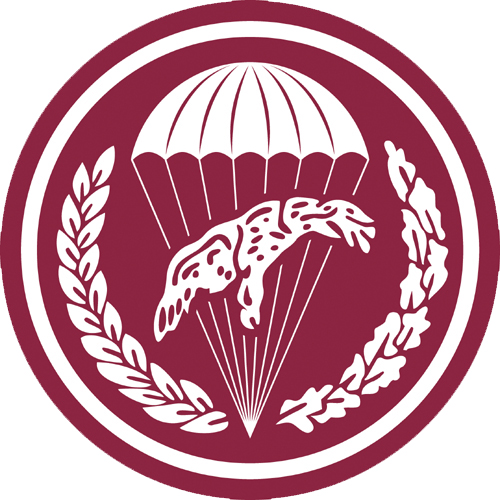
- Shoulder sleeve insignia
- Active: 1986–present (traditions from 1941)
- Country: Poland
- Branch: Polish Land Forces
- Type: Airborne infantry
- Size: Brigade
- Part of: Armed Forces General Command
- Garrison/HQ: Kraków
- Patron: Brigadier General Stanisław Sosabowski
- Anniversaries: 23 September
- Engagements: Iraq War; War in Afghanistan

Commanders
- Current commander: Brigadier General Michal Strzelecki

Insignia
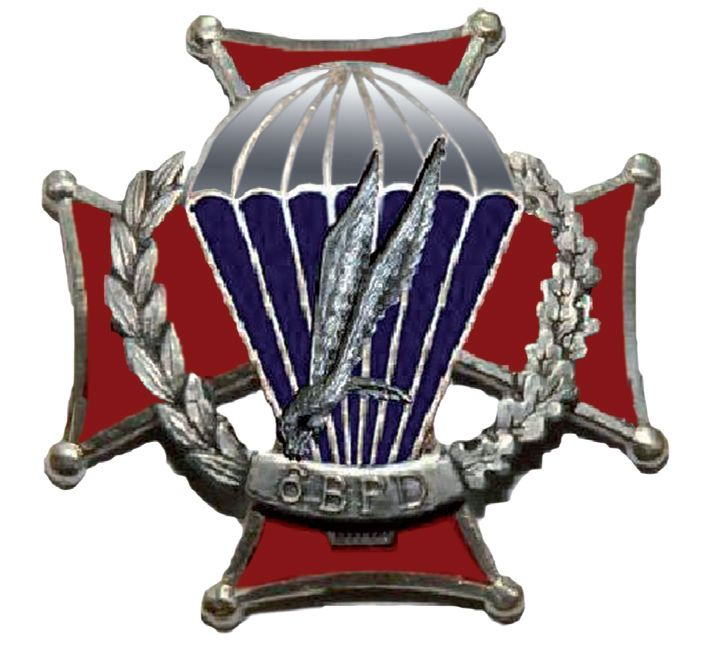
- Distinctive unit insignia

The 6th Airborne Brigade (Polish: 6 Brygada Powietrznodesantowa (6 BPD)) is an elite brigade of the Polish Armed Forces, headquartered in Kraków. The formation specializes as airborne forces and air assault troops, being intended to conduct assault operations from either aircraft or helicopters at a high state of readiness.

== History ==
The 6th Airborne Brigade derives its traditions from the 1st Independent Parachute Brigade, whose commander was Brigadier General Stanisław Sosabowski, today the patron of the unit. The unit's direct lineage stems from the 6th Infantry Division (of the Polish People's Republic post Second World War) which was reformed in 1957 into the 6th Pomeranian Airborne Division, which in turn was reformed in 1986 into the 6th Pomeranian Airborne Brigade.

== Role ==
The 6th Airborne Brigade serves as the Polish Army's air-mobile unit ready to conduct operations at a high state of readiness. The brigade is equipped and trained to carry out rapid landings either as paratroopers or through insertion by helicopters. In this role, the brigade can launch surprise raids to capture strategic targets such as bridges, airports and other positions deep behind enemy lines and maintain their position until being relieved by friendly ground forces.

The brigade can also carry out a number of other roles if required. These include conducting the evacuation of non-military personnel from hostile environments, supporting Polish Special Forces operations, and taking part in peace keeping missions with the UN and other organisations.

== Structure ==
As of 16 October 2022 the brigade is composed of five separate battalions; 1 command battalion, 3 airborne infantry battalions, and 1 logistics battalion. The command battalion provides command and control for the brigade and also provides a reconnaissance company, a company of sappers, and an anti-aircraft battery. The airborne battalions consists of: a command company, 3 rifle companies, a mortar company, a logistics company and a medical support team. The brigade's logistics battalion is tasked with supplying any material supplies needed by the brigade during an operation.

Brigade units are stationed in three separate garrisons, its structure is as follows:

- 6th Airborne Brigade "Brig. Gen. Stanisław Sosabowski" in Kraków
  - 6th Command Battalion in Kraków
  - 6th Airborne Battalion in Gliwice
  - 16th Airborne Battalion in Kraków
  - 18th Airborne Battalion in Bielsko-Biała
  - 6th Logistic Battalion in Kraków

The brigade is directly responsible to the Armed Forces General Command (Poland).

== Commanders ==
- Brigadier General January Komański (1986–1987)
- Brigadier General Andrzej Tyszkiewicz (1987–1989)
- Colonel Zdzisław Kazimierski (1989)
- Colonel Władysław Sokół (1989–1992)
- Brigadier General Włodzimierz Michalski (1992–1994)
- Brigadier General Mieczysław Bieniek (1994–1997)
- Brigadier General Bronisław Kwiatkowski (1997–2000)
- Colonel Jerzy Wójcik (2000–2002)
- Colonel Mirosław Knapiński (2002–2004)
- Brigadier General Jerzy Wójcik (2004–2008)
- Brigadier General Andrzej Knap (2008–2010)
- Brigadier General Bogdan Tworkowski (2010–2012)
- Brigadier General Adam Joks (2012–2015)
- Colonel Wojciech Marchwica (2015–2016)
- Brigadier General Grzegorz Hałupka (2016–2018)
- Brigadier General Szymon Koziatek (2018-2019)
- Brigadier General Grzegorz Grodzki (2019–present)

== See also ==
- 25th Air Cavalry Brigade
