= Armed Forces Operational Command (Poland) =

One of two main command bodies of the Polish Armed Forces

- Dowództwo Operacyjne Rodzajów Sił Zbrojnych
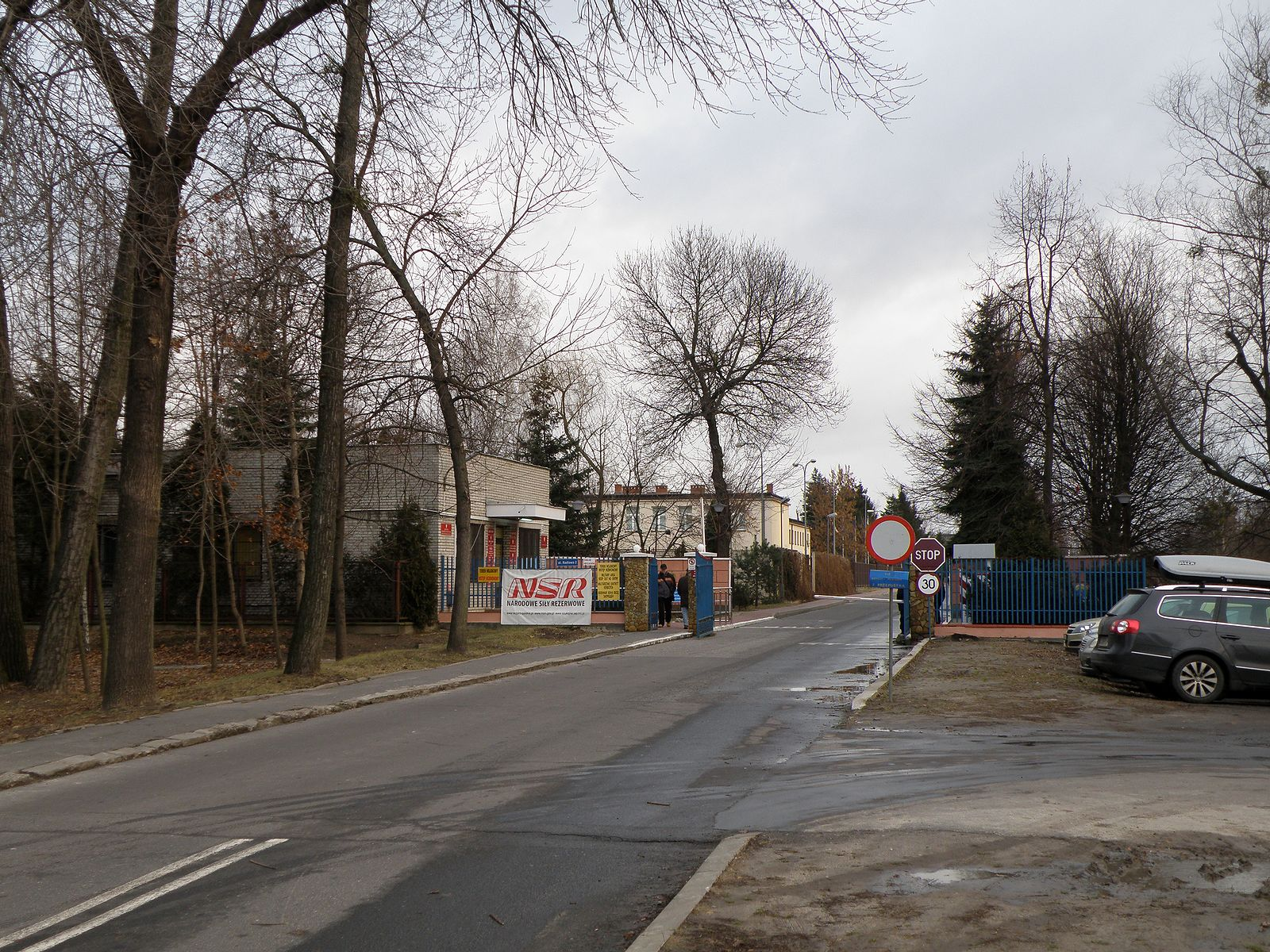
- Gateway to the Radiowej 2 military complex
- Active: 22 October 2003 – present
- Country: Poland
- Allegiance: Polish Armed Forces
- Branch: Territorial Defence Force
- Type: Headquarters
- Role: Infantry
- Garrison/HQ: Warsaw
- Patron: Bronisław Kwiatkowski

Commanders
- Lieutenant general: Ireneusz Nowak

Insignia
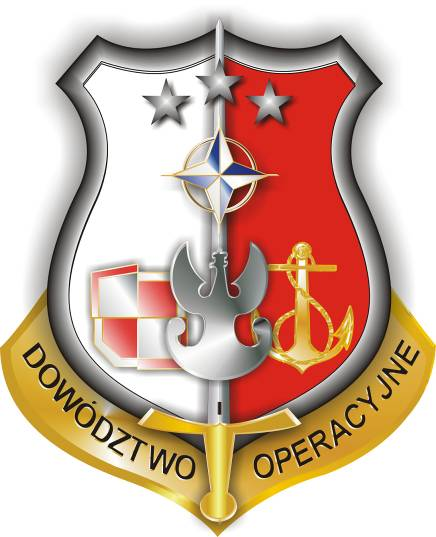
- DOSZ distinctive unit insignia (before 2014)

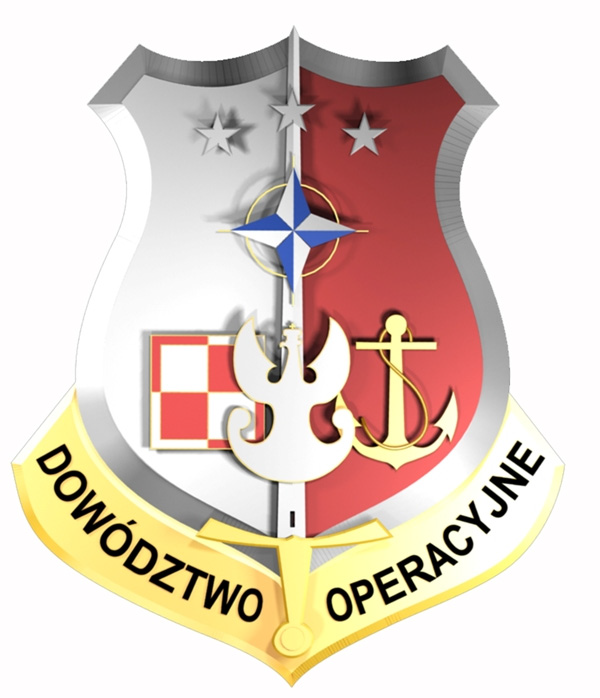
- DORSZ distinctive unit insignia (since 2014)

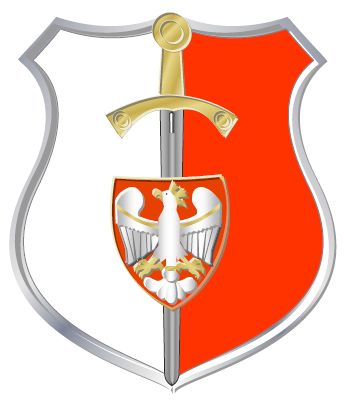
- DORSZ shoulder sleeve insignia (everyday uniform) (since 2014)

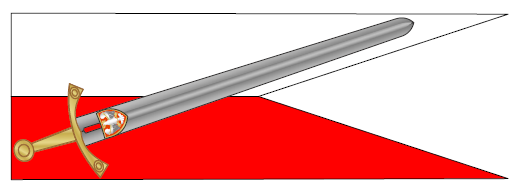
- DORSZ beret flash (since 2014)

The Armed Forces Operational Command "General Bronisław Kwiatkowski" (Polish: Dowództwo Operacyjne Rodzajów Sił Zbrojnych im. generała Bronisława Kwiatkowskiego, DO RSZ) is one of the two main command bodies of the Polish Armed Forces. It is responsible for operational command of the forces. The other main command is the Armed Forces General Command, responsible for training and making ready forces.

The headquarters of the Command is located in Warsaw in Bemowo at Ulitsa Radiowa Street in Warsaw 2.

On January 1, 2014, pursuant to art. 13 of the Act amending the Act on the Office of the Minister of National Defence and certain other acts (Journal of Laws (2013) 852), the Operational Command of the Armed Forces (DOSZ) was transformed into the Operational Command of the Armed Forces Branches (from the Polish verb rozdwajać się - to split; to branch out into separate entities).

== History ==
The Operational Command was originally established on October 22, 2003 by decision of the Minister of National Defence. The headquarters was made fully operational on June 30, 2005, and on July 1, took command of the forces involved in peace support and stabilization operations around the world. In accordance with the act of 24 May 2007 amending the act on the general obligation to defend the Republic of Poland and amending certain other acts, it was transformed into the Operational Command of the Armed Forces on July 4, 2007. Shortly thereafter, the Military Movement Coordination Center - Transport and Military Movement Command was transferred to the Inspectorate of Armed Forces Support.

By Decision No. 58/MON of April 10, 2019, the Operational Command of the Armed Forces received the name of General Bronisław Kwiatkowski.

== Structure ==
The Command is headed by the Operational Commander of the Armed Forces Branches (Dowódca Operacyjny Rodzajów Sił Zbrojnych) - a Generał broni or the equivalent Admirał floty, a three-star flag officer. He is aided by the Deputy of the Operational Commander of the Armed Forces Branches (Zastępca Dowódcy Operacyjnego Rodzajów Sił Zbrojnych) - a two-star Generał dywizji or a Wiceadmirał. The DO RSZ's Chief of Staff is a Colonel (Pułkownik) or the equal naval rank of a Commodore (Komandor).

Command (Dowództwo)

- Operational Commander of the Armed Forces Branches (Dowódca Operacyjny Rodzajów Sił Zbrojnych)
- Deputy of the Operational Commander of the Armed Forces Branches (Zastępca Dowódcy Operacyjnego Rodzajów Sił Zbrojnych)
- Commander's Office (Sekretariat)
- Senior Command NCO (Starszy Podoficer Dowództwa)
- Legal Section (Oddział Prawny)
- Air Defence Directorate (Szefostwo Obrony Powietrznej)
- Lessons Learned Section (Oddział Wykorzystania Doświadczeń)
- Protection of Classified Information Section (Oddział Ochrony Informacji Niejawnych)
- Chief Accountant's Division (Pion Głównego Księgowego)
- Public Communications Section (Oddział Komunikacji Społecznej)
- Flight Safety Department (Wydział Bezpieczeństwa Lotów)
- Planning and Coordination Section (Oddział Planistyczno-Koordynacyjny)
- Public Procurement Section (Sekcja Zamówień Publcznych)

Staff (Sztab)

- Chief of Staff (Szef Sztabu)
  - Operations Division (Pion Operacyjny)
    - Operations Directorate J-3 (Zarząd Operacyjny J-3)
      - Ongoing Operations Section (Oddział Operacji Bieżących)
      - Military Engineering Section (Oddział Inżynierii Wojskowej)
    - Intelligence and Electronic Warfare Directorate J-2 (Zarząd Rozpoznania i Walki Elektronicznej J-2)
      - Intelligence Analysis Section (Oddział Analiz Rozpoznawczych)
      - Intelligence Planning and Control Section (Oddział Planowania i Kierowania Rozpoznaniem)
      - Electronic Warfare Section (Oddział Walki Radioelektronicznej)
      - Information Requirements Management Section (Oddział Zarządzania Wymaganiami Informacyjnymi)
  - Planning Division (Pion Planowania)
    - Planning Directorate J-5 (Zarząd Planowania J-5)
      - Armed Forces Application Planning Section (Oddział Planowania Użycia Sił Zbrojnych)
      - Non-Kinetic Actions Section (Oddział Działań Niekinetycznych)
      - Troops Survivability and Protection Section (Wydział Przetrwania i Ochrony Wojsk)
      - Land Forces Operations Section (Oddział Operacji Lądowych)
      - Air Force Operations Section (Oddział Operacji Powietrznych)
      - Targeting Department (Wydział Targetingu)
      - Naval Operations Section (Oddział Operacji Morskich)
    - Training Directorate J-7 (Zarząd Szkolenia J-7)
      - Exercises and Combat Training Section (Oddział Ćwiczeń i Szkolenia Bojowego)
      - Operational Control and Certification Section (Oddział Kontroli Operacyjnej i Certyfikacji)
  - Support Division (Pion Wsparcia)
    - Personnel Resources Directorate J-1 (Zarząd Zasobów Osobowych J-1)
      - Personnel Complement Section (Oddział Personalno-Uzupełnieniowy)
      - Competencies Organization and Overseas Affairs Section (Oddział Organizacyjno-Kompetencyjny i Służby Poza Granicami Państwa)
    - Logistics Directorate J-4 (Zarząd Logistyki J-4)
      - Logistical Planning and Coordination Section (Oddział Planowania Logistycznego i Koordynacji)
      - Material Supply Planning Section (Oddział Planowania Zabezpieczenia Materiałowego)
      - Technical Supply Planning Section (Oddział Planowania Zabezpieczenia Technicznego)
      - Transport and Host Nation Support Section (Oddział Transportu i HNS)
      - Infrastructure Department (Wydział Infrastruktury)
      - Medical Operations Section (Oddział Operacyjno-Medyczny)
      - Troop Contingents Supply Section (Oddział Zabezpieczenia Kontyngentów Wojskowych)
      - General Administration Department (Wydział Administracji Ogólnej)
    - Signals and Information Systems Directorate J-6 (Zarząd Łączności i Informatyki J-6)
      - CIS Planning Section (Oddział Planowania Systemów Łączności i Informatyki)
      - IT Support Management Section (Oddział Zarządzania Wsparciem Teleinformatycznym)
      - IT Security Section (Oddział Bezpieczeństwa Teleinformatycznego)

Institutions directly subordinated to the Operational Commander of the Armed Forces Branches (Instytucje podległe bezpośrednio Dowódcy Operacyjnemu Rodzajów Sił Zbrojnych)

- Land Forces Operations Center - Land Forces Component Command "Lt.-Gen. "Władysław Anders" (Centrum Operacji Lądowych – Dowództwa Komponentu Lądowego im.gen.brony Władisława Andersa) - Kraków
- Air Forces Operations Center - Air Forces Component Command (Centrum Operacji Powietrznych - Dowództwo Komponentu Powietrznego) - Warsaw-Pyry
- Naval Operations Center - Naval Component Command (Centrum Operacji Morskich - Dowództwo Komponentu Morskiego) - Gdynia
- (The Special Operations Center - Special Forces Component Command (Centrum Operacji Specjalnych – Dowództwo Komponentu Wojsk Specjalnych) in Kraków under the Armed Forces Operational Command and the Special Forces Inspectorate (Inspektorat Wojsk Specjalnych) under the Armed Forces General Command have been disbanded and their functions fully absorbed into the Special Forces Component Command (Dowództwo Komponentu Wojsk Specjalnych) under the Armed Forces General Command).
- Club of the Armed Forces Operational Command (Klub Dowództwa Operacyjnego Rodzajów Sił Zbrojnych) - Warsaw

== Tasks of the Command ==
- commanding Polish military contingents in missions and operations
- planning the use of forces in military and non-military crisis operations
- training and coordination of commands and forces of separate components of the Armed Forces in joint operations
- managing the duty forces of the Integrated Reconnaissance System of the Armed Forces
- monitoring the readiness of national components assigned to the NATO Response Force
