= Jarosław Mika =

Polish officer (born 1962)

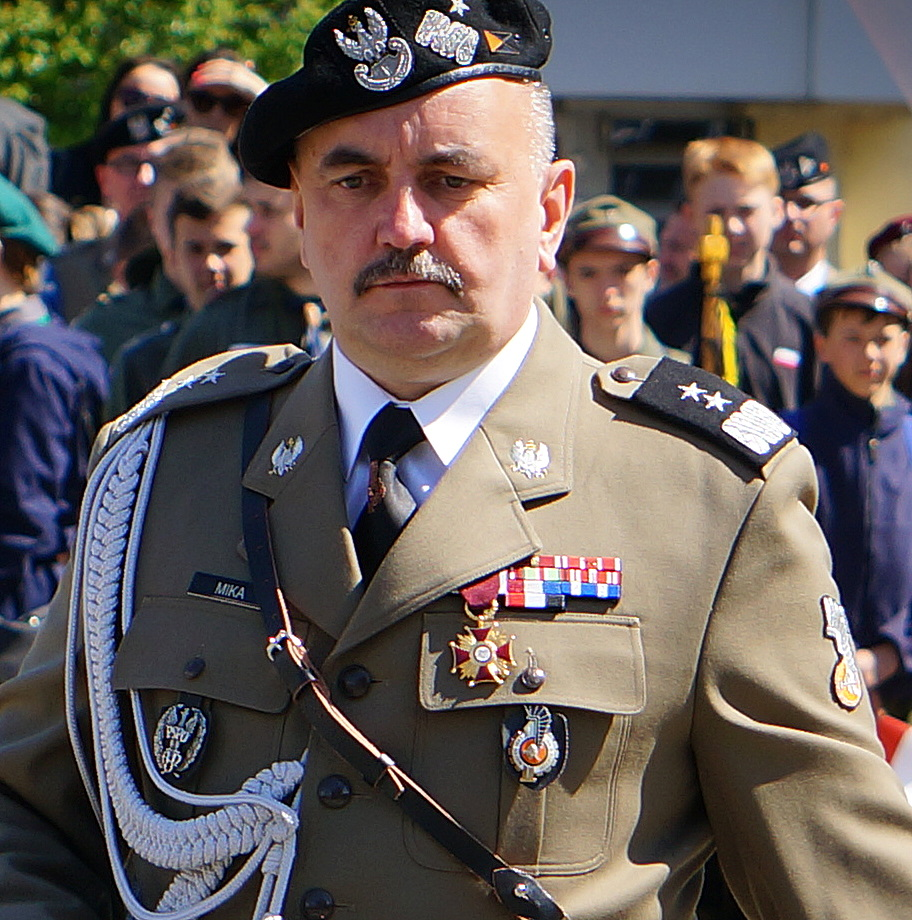
- Born: 31 October 1962 (age 63); Lądek-Zdrój, Poland
- Allegiance: Poland
- Branch: Polish Land Forces
- Rank: General

Jarosław Mika (born 31 October 1962) is a Polish Land Forces officer who served as the general commander of Branches of the Armed Forces between 2017 and 2023.

== Biography ==
Mika was born on 31 October 1962, and he joined the Polish military in 1981 when he joined the Armored Forces Academy in Poznań. He graduated in 1985 and joined the 5th Armored Division as a platoon commander, and later battalion commander. He graduated from the National Defence University of Warsaw in 1993 and was transferred to the Army General Staff.

In 2007, Mika served in the Polish Military Contingent in Iraq, after which he was assigned to the Multinational Corps Northeast. He was assigned command of the 20th Bartoszyce Mechanized Brigade in 2011, and also that year was assigned to Afghanistan. He became commander of the 11th Armoured Cavalry Division starting in 2014, when he was a major general. Still as a major general, he was appointed as general commander of Branches of the Armed Forces on 7 February 2017. He was promoted to a four-star general in November 2019, and was reappointed General Commander for another term in February 2020.

During the 2020 coronavirus outbreak in Poland, Mika was diagnosed with the Coronavirus on 10 March 2020. In 2023, Wiesław Kukuła replaced him as general commander.
