= National Defence University of Warsaw =

Coordinates: 52°16′00″N 21°10′23″E

- Akademia Obrony Narodowej
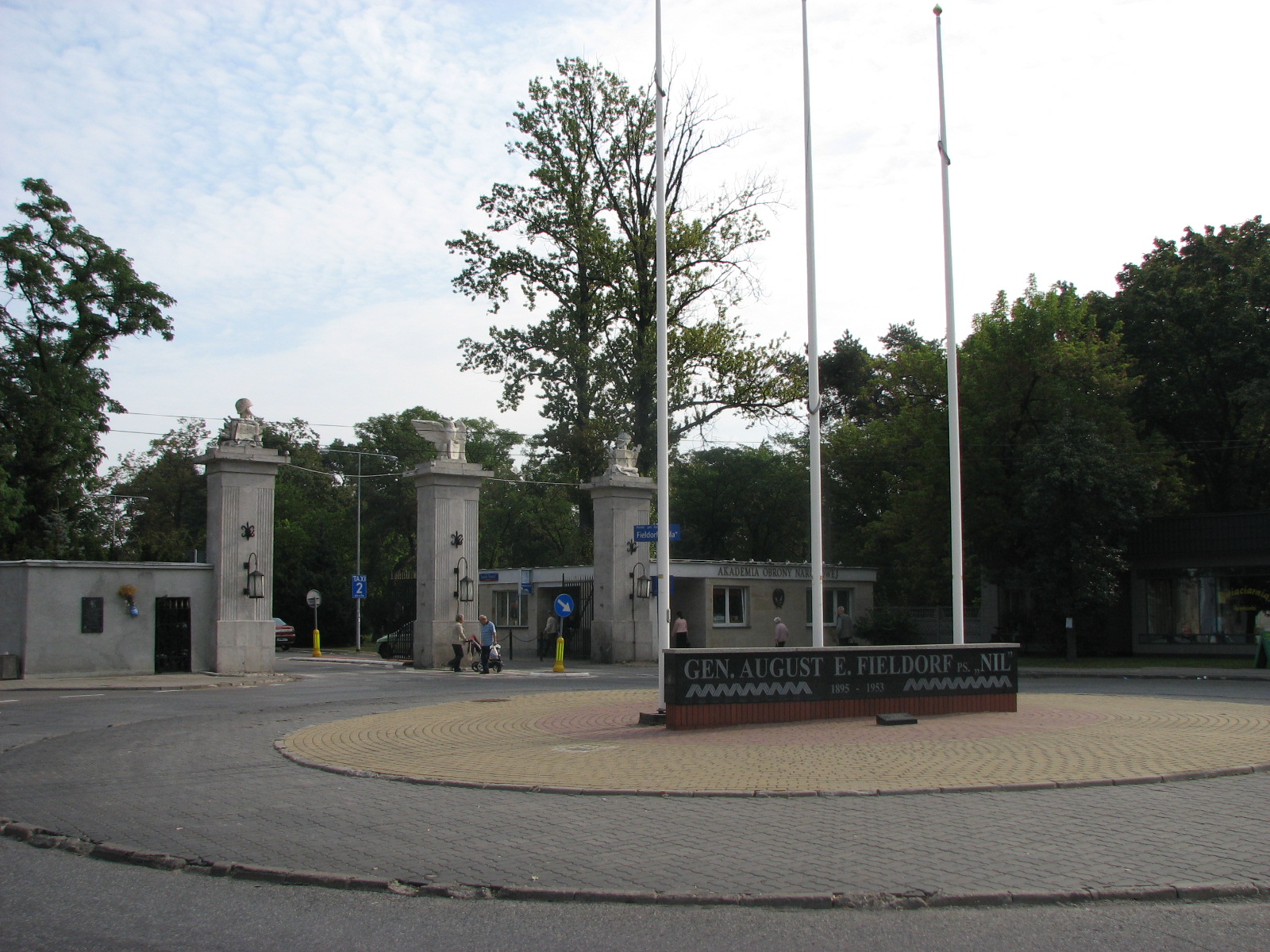
- Type: military university/public university
- Active: 1990–2016
- Rector: Ryszard Parafianowicz
- Location: Aleja Generała Chruściela "Montera" 103, 00-910 Warsaw, Poland
- Affiliations: ISMS
- Website: www.aon.edu.pl
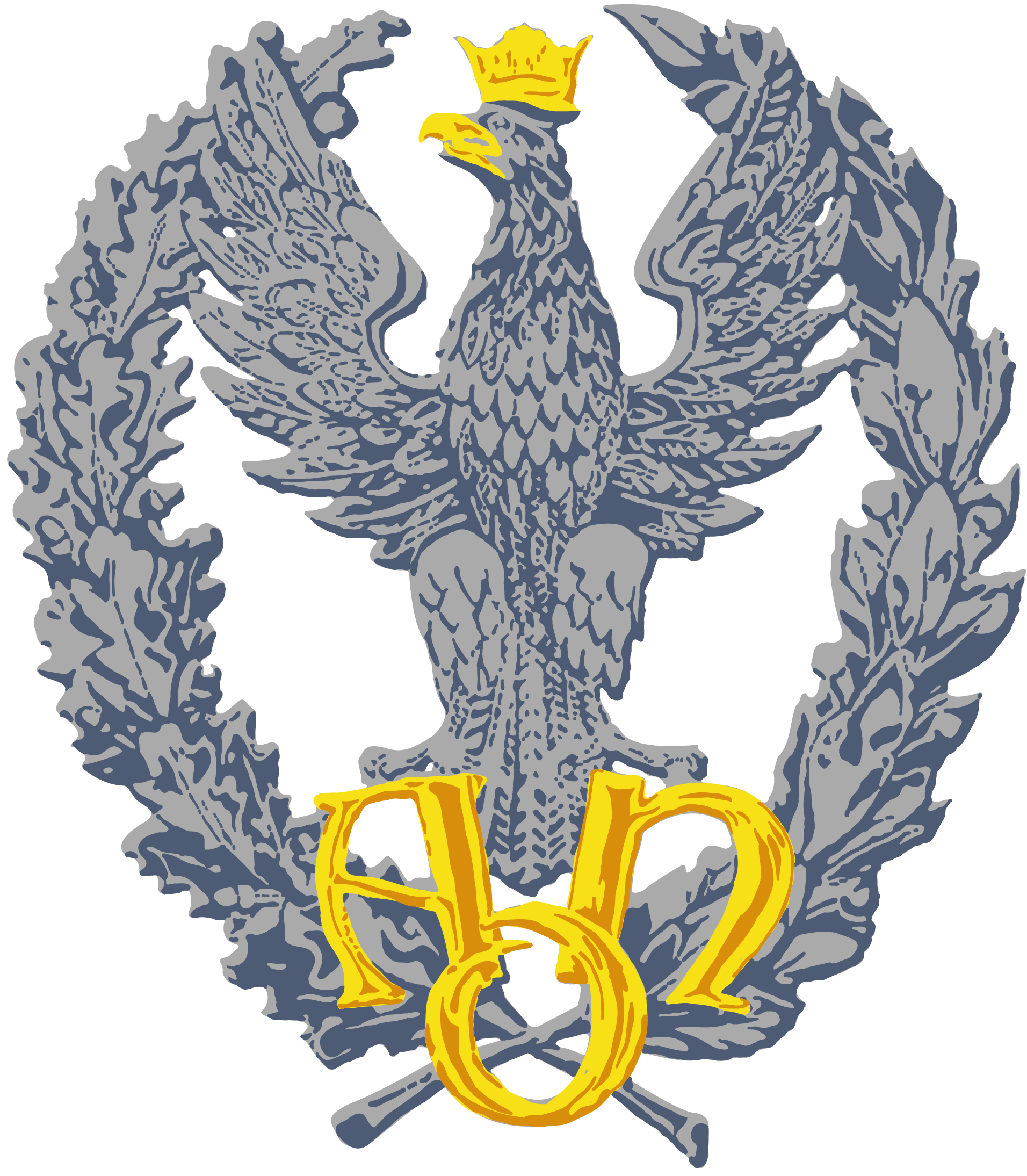

The National Defence University of Warsaw (Polish: Akademia Obrony Narodowej – AON) was the civil-military highest defence academic institution in Poland, located in Warsaw–Rembertów. In 2016 it was succeeded by the War Studies University.

The National Defence University in Warsaw was established on 1 October 1990 after reform of the General Staff Academy (est. 1947) and continued traditions of the Szkoła Rycerska ("The School of Knights") founded on 15 March 1765 and other subsequent military schools. The National Defence University was subordinate directly to the Polish Ministry of National Education. AON was the alma mater of Polish commanding and staff officers and civilian experts in national and international security matters. It also conducted extensive scientific research on state defence issues, military doctrine, theory of warfare, military art, including military strategy, operational art and tactics, also in the field of national and international security. The National Defence University in Warsaw cooperated with the Polish Ministry of National Defence, General Staff, North Atlantic Treaty Organization and other Polish and foreign military, scientific and academic institutions.

The school's master's program was a five-years study program, but also AON provided two-years under- and over graduate study programs and four-years PhD (Doctor of Science) programs and higher doctorate (habilitation) opportunity as well.

== History ==
=== Corps of Cadets ===
The present National Defence University inherits the traditions of all previous Polish military academies. The first such school, the Szkoła Rycerska, was founded in 1765 by King Stanisław August Poniatowski. Its graduates included some of the most notable military men of the 18th and 19th centuries, including Tadeusz Kościuszko, Jakub Jasiński, Maurycy Hauke, Julian Ursyn Niemcewicz, Karol Kniaziewicz, Józef Sowiński, Kazimierz Nestor Sapieha and Rajmund Rembieliński.

=== Artillery and Engineers School ===
In 1794, after the Partitions of Poland, the school was closed. However, after 1815 the recreation of the Kingdom of Poland allowed for opening several military colleges in Poland. The most notable, Szkoła Aplikacyjna Artylerii i Inżynierii (Artillery and Engineers School), was located in Warsaw and trained cadres of the Polish Army that fought in the November 1830 Uprising against Russia. Only some 24 officers were admitted each year, making its graduates an elite of the Polish armed forces. The instructor in French language was Mikołaj Chopin, father of renowned composer Fryderyk Chopin. After the November Uprising, the school was closed by Russian authorities. However, military training of Polish officers continued in foreign schools, most notably in France and Italy.

=== Higher War School ===
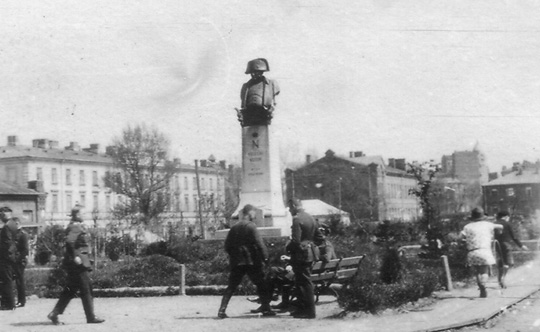
Monument to Napoleon Bonaparte in front of the main Higher War School campus in Warsaw; after the war the monument was moved to the Museum of the Polish Army

Wyższa Szkoła Wojenna (English: Higher War School) was the most important Polish military academy in the period between the World Wars. Located at Warsaw, it was established to train high-ranking officers of the Polish Army and of the armed forces of several allied states. It was a predecessor of Poland's present National Defense Academy (Polish: Akademia Obrony Narodowej).

During the 20 years of its existence, the school trained more than 1300 officers of the Polish Army. Most of them repaid the debt for Poland during the Polish Defensive War of 1939, while the majority of professors formed the staff of Poznań Army, the most successful of Polish Armies in the 1939 campaign.

After Poland was overrun by Nazi Germany and the Soviet Union, the school was closed. However, on November 11, 1940, it was recreated in London. It trained the officers of the Polish Army in Exile, fighting alongside the Allies on all fronts of World War II. The professors were recruited from among the active officers of the Polish HQ and the students included many of the notable generals of the Polish forces in Exile. In addition, the school was the alma mater of all highest-ranking Czechoslovak officers of the exiled army. It was closed in 1946, after the Allies withdrew their support for the Polish government. Meanwhile, in Poland, a communist regime took power and a new military academy was established in 1947, the Świerczewski General Staff Academy.

=== The War College in Exile ===
The outbreak of World War II interrupted the activities of War College only for several months. Order of the Supreme Commander of 11 November 1940, resumed its activities initially in London (United Kingdom) and later in Scotland. To the War College in Exile were appointed officers – in ranks of lieutenants and captains. Students were also the Czechoslovak army officers. The purpose of education was to prepare personnel to serve in the brigade and division staffs of the Polish Armed Forces in the West. The program and methods of education were similar to those from the period War College in Warsaw. School received establishment to the exercises, instructions and other normative documents from the British armed forces, allowing joint operations. School staff were officers of the Polish Commander of Staff. The activities of the War College in Exile was halted in July 1946. After the World War II, traditions of higher military education were continued in the Poland.

=== General Staff Academy ===
On April 17, 1947, the Minister of National Defense, Marshal of Poland, Michał Rola-Żymierski, issued an order to establish the Preparatory Group of the General Staff Academy. Major General Zygmunt Berling became the Commander of the Preparatory Group, Colonel Mieczysław Szleyen was the Deputy Commander for Political Affairs, and Captain Włodzimierz Sęk was the Quartermaster. The group was given three rooms in a building at Aleje Niepodległości 247 in Warsaw. The group's task was to assemble a staff, primarily scientific, and to prepare a training base, including supervising the renovation of the former Free Polish University building at Opaczewska Street 2 (currently Stefana Banacha Street).

On July 7, 1947, the Minister of National Defense issued Order No. 0184/Org. on disbanding the Preparatory Group and organizing the General Staff Academy. In September 1947, the first candidates for studies were accepted.

On October 22, 1947, the Council of Ministers sanctioned the establishment of the General Staff Academy as a state academic school by decree. The school was directly subordinate to the Chief of the General Staff of the Polish Army.

The statutory task of the academy was to develop the theory of warfare in accordance with the needs of the staffs and armies and the principles of effective defense of the state. It prepared officers with higher education for command and staff positions. Its graduates have included Zygmunt Zieliński, Bolesław Chocha, Antoni Jasiński and Wojciech Jaruzelski. In accordance with resolution of the Council of Ministers of 21 May 1990, the General Staff Academy was transformed into the National Defence University of Warsaw on 1 October 1990.

== Organizational units ==
- National Security Faculty
- Management and Command Faculty
- War Games and Simulation Center
- CBRN Defence Training Centre
- Officers Training Centre
- Foreign Languages Teaching Centre
- Physical Education and Shooting Training Branch
- Centre of International Cooperation
- Library
- Studies Organization Department
- Financial Office
- Human Resources Department
- Logistic Department
- Science and Research Branch
- Promotion of Education and Culture Branch
- Protection of Classified Information Branch
- Work Safety Section
- National Defence University Publishing House

== Studies ==
Studies for officers:

Second degree studies (leading to a master's degree) in the following areas:

- National Security
- Economics
- Logistics
- Management with two specialisations: command and command of aviation National Security

Postgraduate studies and advanced courses:

- Post-graduate Defence Policy Studies
- Advanced Operational-Strategic Course
- Post-graduate Operational-Tactical Studies
- Post-graduate Air Force Command Studies

Studies for civilians:

Full-time and part-time first degree studies (leading to a bachelor's degree) and second degree studies (leading to a master's degree) in the following areas:

- National Security
- European Studies
- Logistics
- Management with two specialisations: Management and Command or Aviation Management
- History

Postgraduate studies in the field of:

- National Security
- Aviation Management
- Information Security Management
- Economic Systems Logistics
- Crisis Management
- International Military Relations
- Management in Military Staffs
- State's Economic Security
- Public Organizations Management
- Civil-Military Cooperation
- Management and Command in Multinational Organizations
- Education for Security
- Polemology – study of war and peace
- The Use of Force in Armed Conflicts
- Counter-Terrorism

== Alumni ==
- Tadeusz Sapierzyński
- Roman Polko
- Andrzej Błasik
- Stanisław Targosz
- Zdzisław Żurawski
- Tadeusz Buk
- Kazimierz Gilarski
- Andrzej Karweta
- Włodzimierz Potasiński
- Jarosław Mika
- Tomasz Piotrowski

== See also ==
- List of Polish universities
- Indonesian Army Command and General Staff College
