= Kawaleria Powietrzna =

Kawaleria Powietrzna ("air cavalry") is a Polish documentary TV series, with 26 episodes produced for Telewizja Polska in 2000 by filmmakers Jacek Bławut and Wojciech Maciejewski.

Broadcast by the TVP2 channel, it shows military training of freshmen in 25th Aeromobile Cavalry Brigade in Tomaszów Mazowiecki.

The series has caused controversy in Poland over the use of vulgarisms and harsh training methods. One episode depicted a conscript being discharged due to depression.

== Cast ==
Some officers and NCOs shown in the series:

- gen. bryg. Jan Kempara
- ppłk Tadeusz Buk
- mjr Piotr Patalong
- por. Grzegorz Grodzki
- ppor. Rafał Lis
- por. Andrzej Kopacki
- st. sierż. Jarosław Kantorowski

== Episodes ==
1. "Bilet czyli karta powołania"
2. "Wcielenie czyli ścieżka poborowego"
3. "Pobudka czyli pierwsze kroki"
4. "Sprawdzian czyli siła rekruta"
5. "Pierwsza broń czyli kałach został moją panią"
6. "Taktyka czyli będę słuchał swojego dowódcy"
7. "Niedziela czyli nie ma ludzi na kompanii"
8. "Floryda czyli marsz na Glinnik"
9. "Wczoraj wiedziałem czyli pytanie zrozumiałem, odpowiadam"
10. "Wypłata czyli prawa strona gwiżdże"
11. "Przysięga czyli dzień mężczyzny"
12. "Przepustka czyli krótka piłka"
13. "Smutny żołnierz czyli pożegnanie z bronią"
14. "Szwadron czyli metoda kropelkowa"
15. "Wizyta ministra czyli nadeszła wiekopomna chwila"
16. "Ostatnia pompka czyli kapral też człowiek"
17. "Wierny jak pies czyli los żołnierza"
18. "Zabawy na śniegu czyli poligonowy karnawał"
19. "Skoki czyli wojsko leci z nieba"
20. "Pi pi czyli pluton aeromobilny"
21. "Bitwa z piecykiem czyli wojna o pokój"
22. "Wyblinka i prusik czyli nie całuj skał"
23. "Molto bene czyli Polska – Włochy 2 : 1"
24. "Ei bi si czyli psi los szturmana"
25. "A cóż to za wojacy czyli tak było jak było"
26. "Cywil czyli zero zero de de ce"
