= 25th Air Cavalry Brigade =

- 25 Brygada Kawalerii Powietrznej
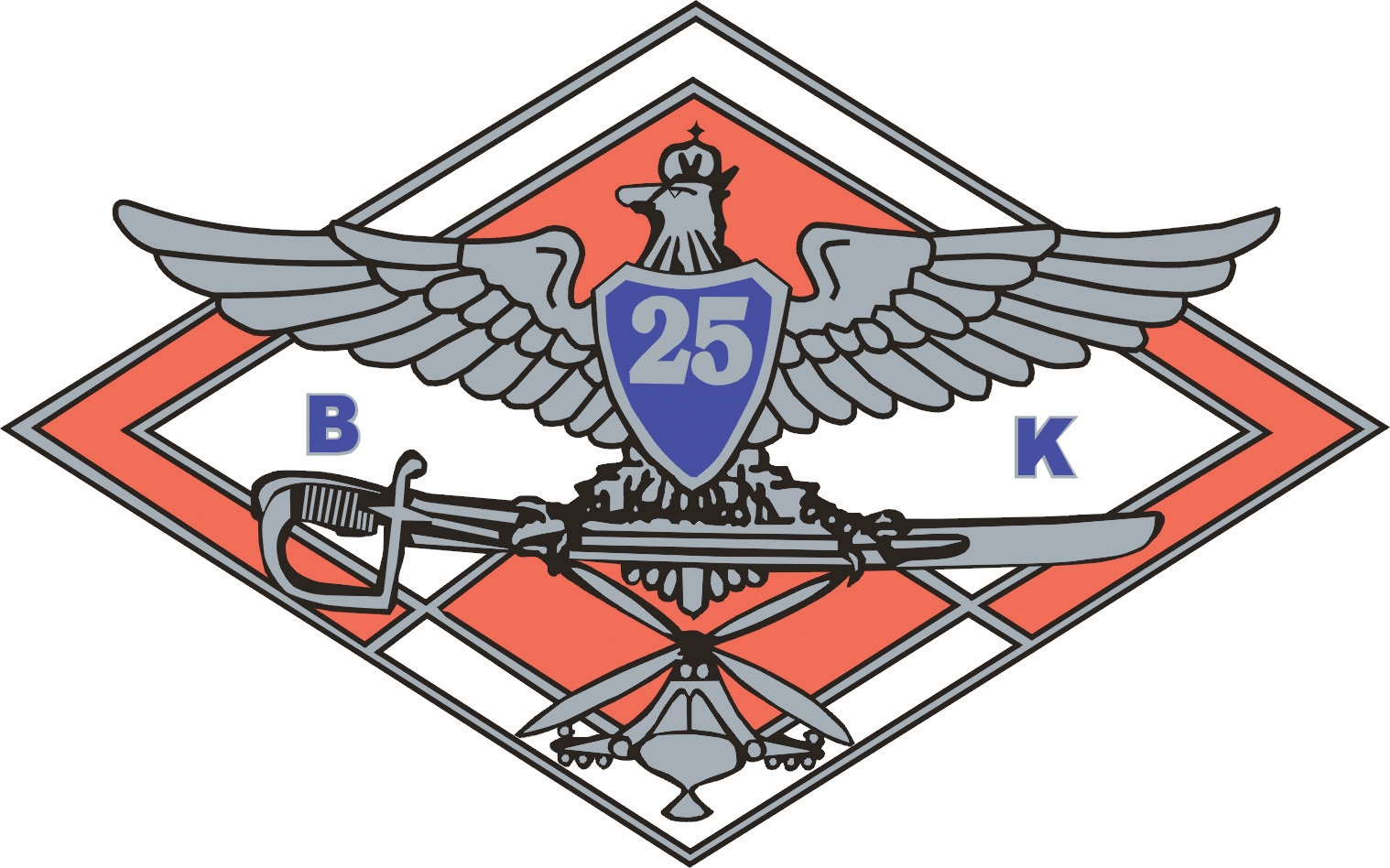
- Distinctive unit insignia
- Active: 1994–present
- Country: Poland
- Branch: Polish Land Forces
- Type: Air assault
- Size: 3500 approx Brigade
- Part of: Armed Forces General Command
- Garrison/HQ: Tomaszów Mazowiecki
- Anniversaries: 18 June
- Engagements: Iraq War; War in Afghanistan

Commanders
- Current commander: Colonel Tomasz BIAŁAS

Insignia
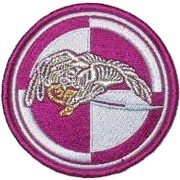
- Shoulder sleeve insignia

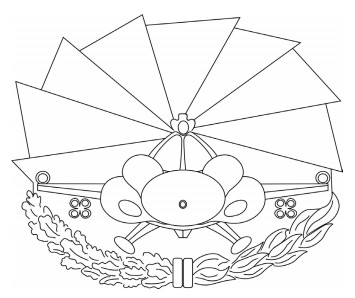
- Beret flash

The 25th Air Cavalry Brigade (Polish: 25 Brygada Kawalerii Powietrznej (25 BKPow.)) is a brigade of the Polish Armed Forces, headquartered in Tomaszów Mazowiecki. The brigade serves as air assault troops, enabling the formation to be transported to battle by helicopters in large numbers.

== History ==
The 25th Air Cavalry Brigade was formed on June 15, 1994 as the 25th Air Cavalry Division, inheriting the traditions of the Mazowiecka Cavalry Brigade. It was not just traditions that were inherited from its predecessors, with the formation's role also intended to be similar to that of the old role of cavalry, which was now replaced by heli-borne troops instead of mounted troops. In September 1999, the 25th Air Cavalry Division was downsized and reformed into the 25th Air Cavalry Brigade.

== Role ==
The brigade serves in an air assault role, where troops are transported to and then inserted into battle using helicopters. This enables the brigade to have a high degree of maneuverability, being able to be transported rapidly to strategic or tactical situations.

== Structure ==
The brigade has 3500 soldiers and is structured as follows:

25th Air Cavalry Brigade in Tomaszów Mazowiecki

  - 25th Command Battalion in Tomaszów Mazowiecki
  - 1st Light Cavalry Battalion in Leźnica Wielka
  - 7th Uhlan Battalion in Tomaszów Mazowiecki
  - 1st Aviation Group in Leźnica Wielka
    - 1st Squadron with 16x Mi-8T transport helicopters
    - 2nd Squadron with 16x Mi-17-1V transport helicopters
  - 7th Aviation Group in Nowy Glinnik
    - 1st Squadron with 12x PZL W-3WA Sokół armed transport helicopters
    - 2nd Squadron with 12x PZL W-3WA Sokół armed transport helicopters
  - Air Medical Evacuation Unit in Nowy Glinnik with 2x PZL W-3WA AE Sokół and 2x Mi-17AE medical evacuation helicopters
  - 25th Logistic Battalion in Tomaszów Mazowiecki

== Gallery ==
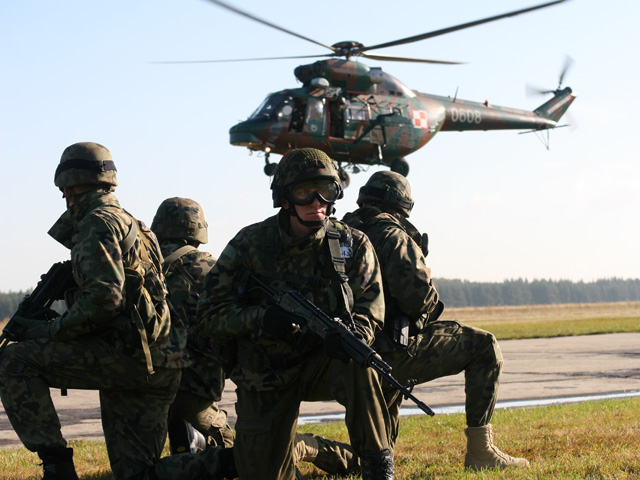
The brigade during a tactical and endurance course.

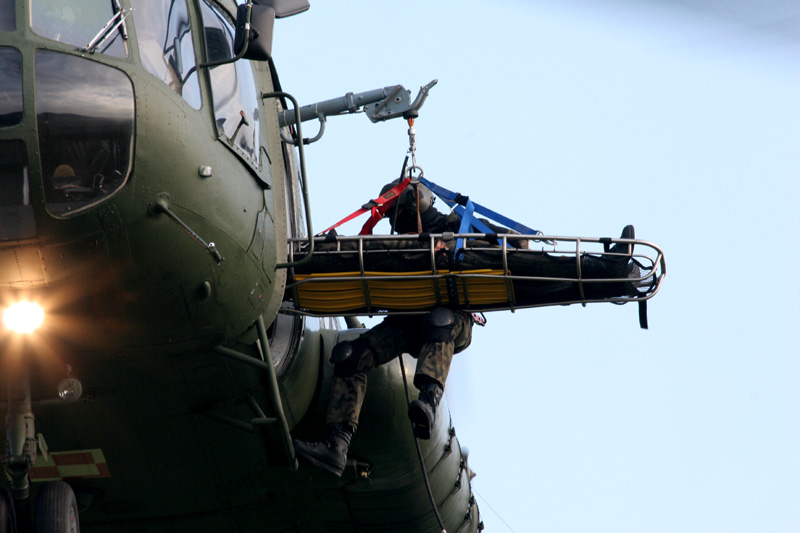
During training.

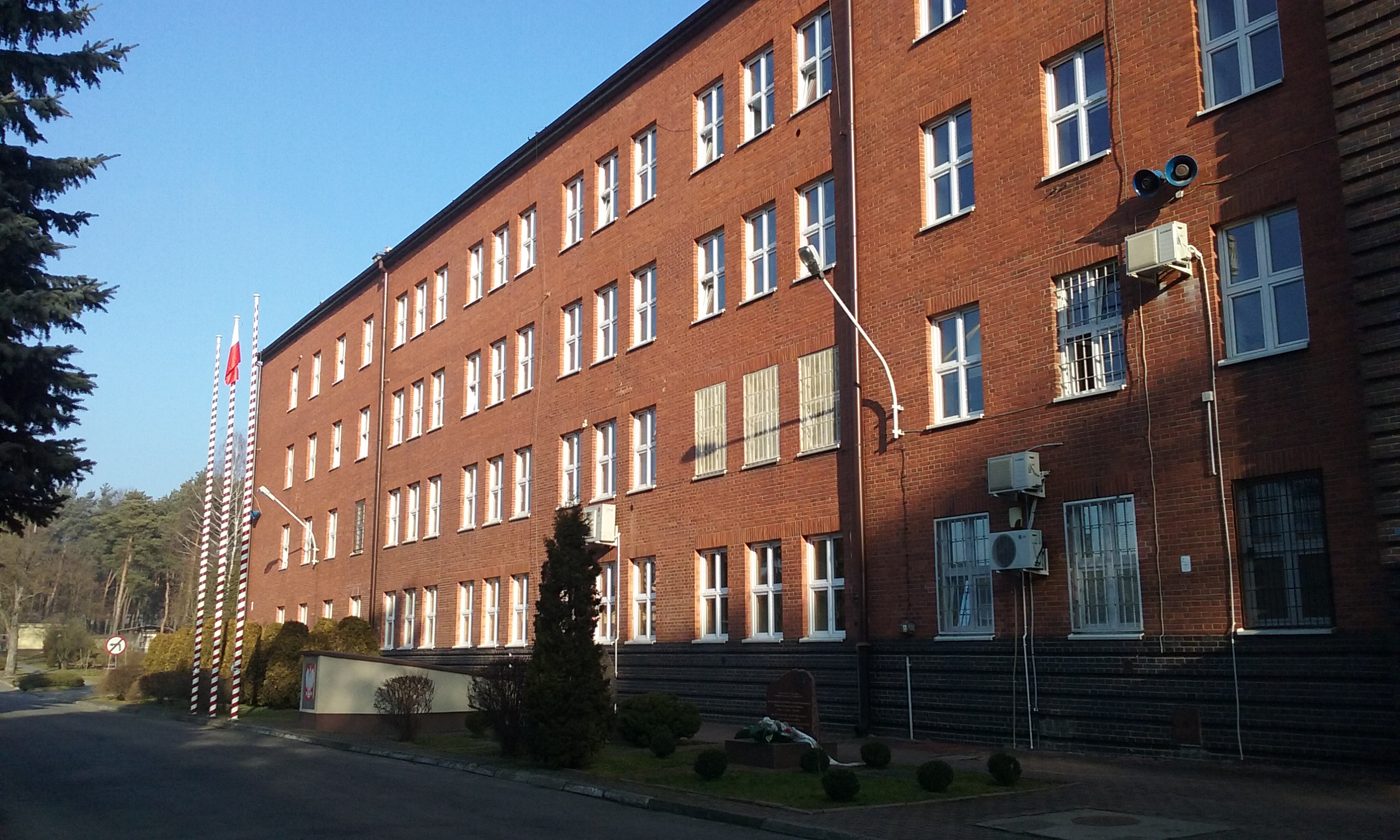
HQ building.

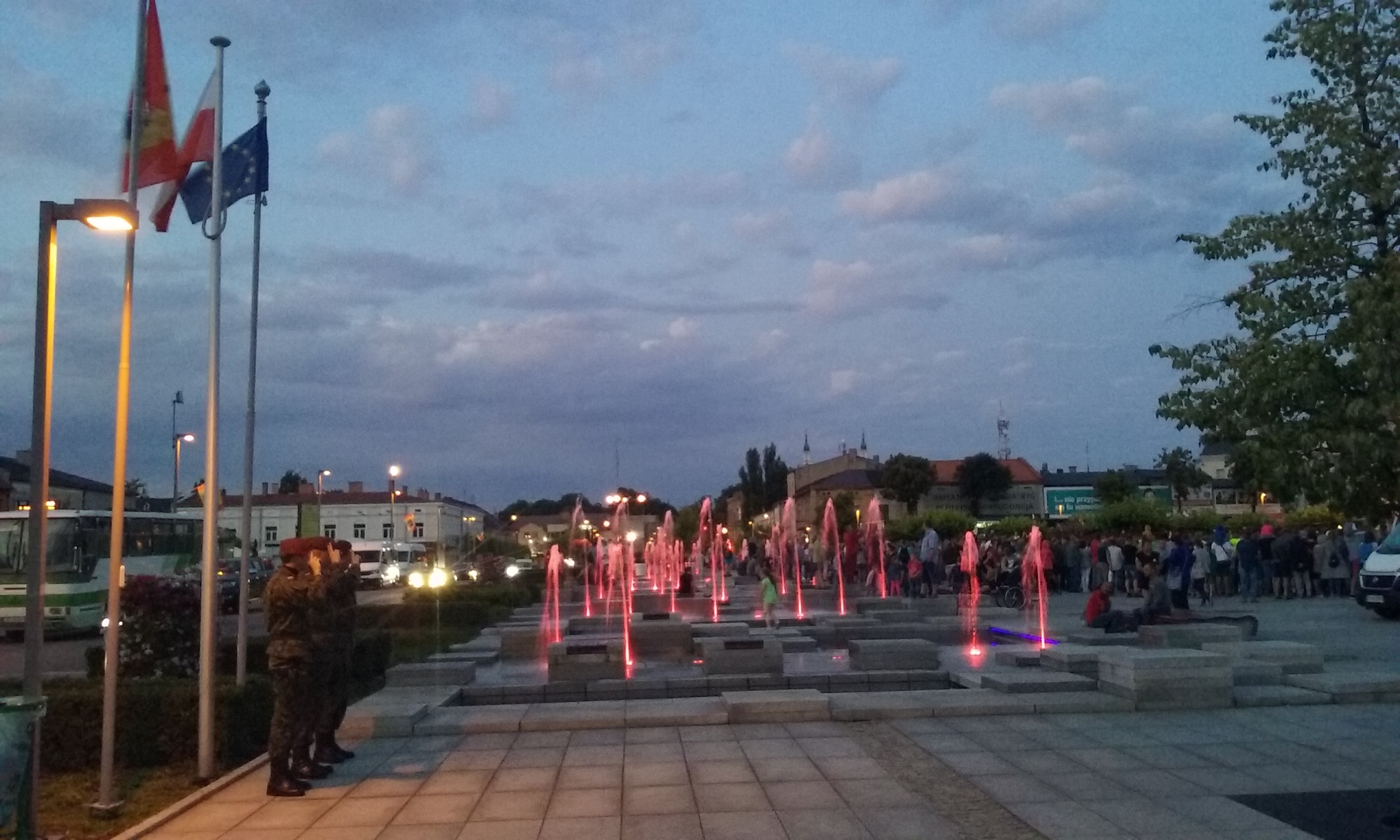
The ceremonial guard of the 25th Air Cavalry Brigade in Tomaszów Mazowiecki during the town ceremony (June 2019).

== See also ==
- 6th Airborne Brigade
- 25th Air Cavalry Brigade (Poland)
