= Andrzej Błasik =

Polish general (1962-2010)

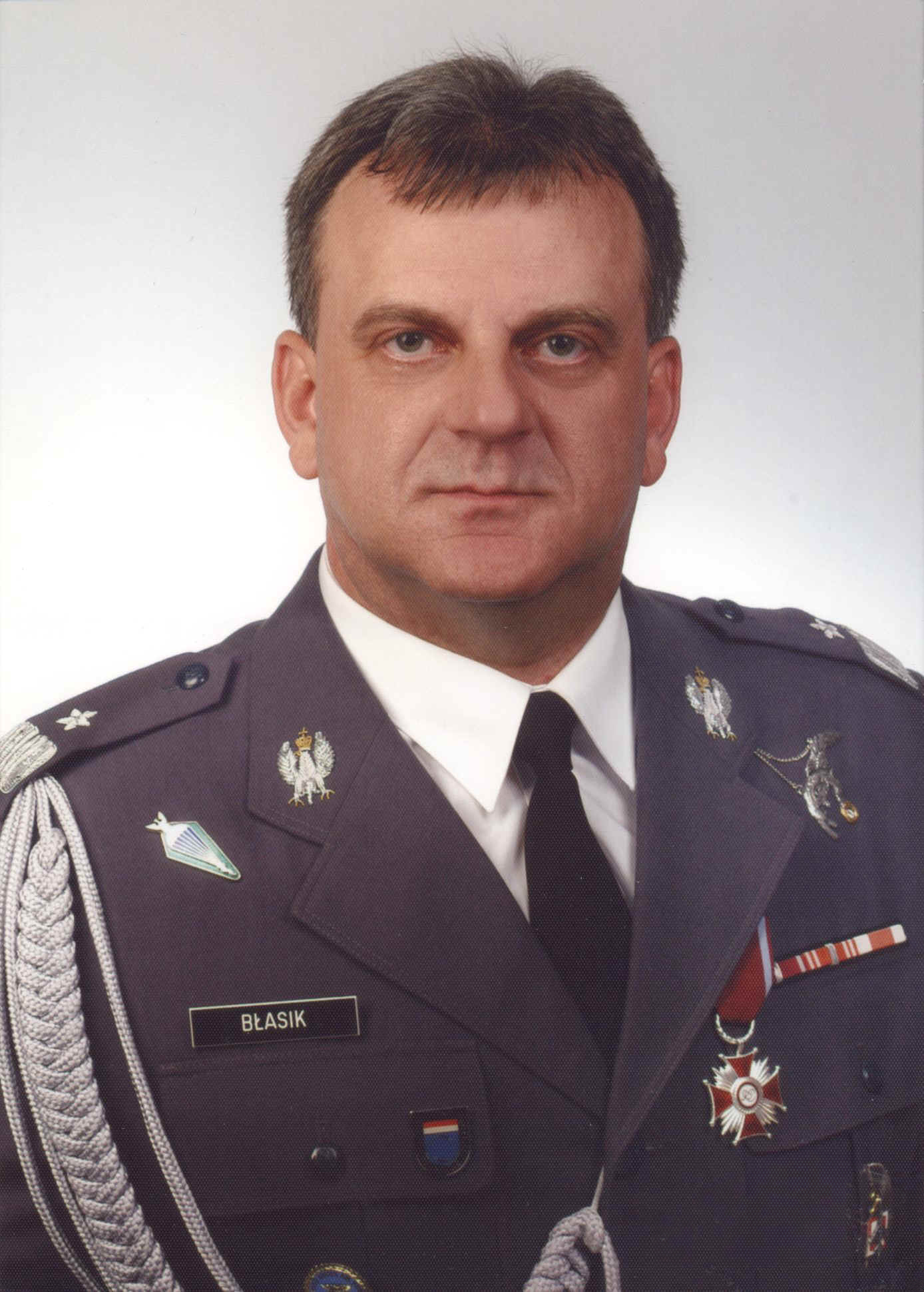

Commander of the Polish Air Force
- In office 19 April 2007 – 10 April 2010
- President: Lech Kaczyński
- Prime Minister: Donald Tusk

Personal details
- Born: 11 October 1962 Poddębice, Poland
- Died: 10 April 2010 (aged 47) Smolensk, Russia
- Spouse: Ewa Błasik
- Children: 2

Military service
- Branch/service: Polish Air Force
- Years of service: 1981–2010
- Rank: Generał broni (Lieutenant general)

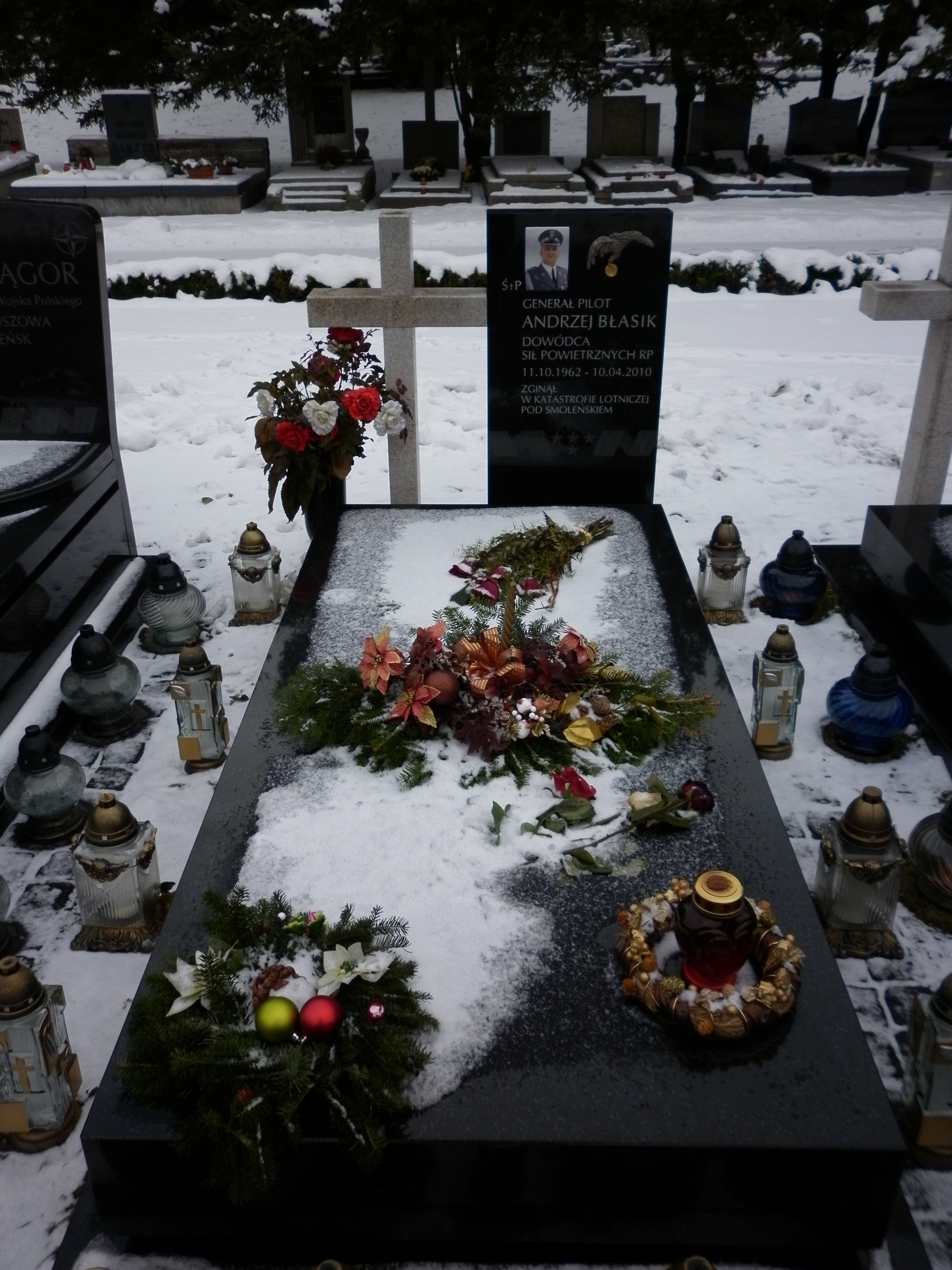
Andrzej Błasik tomb (now)

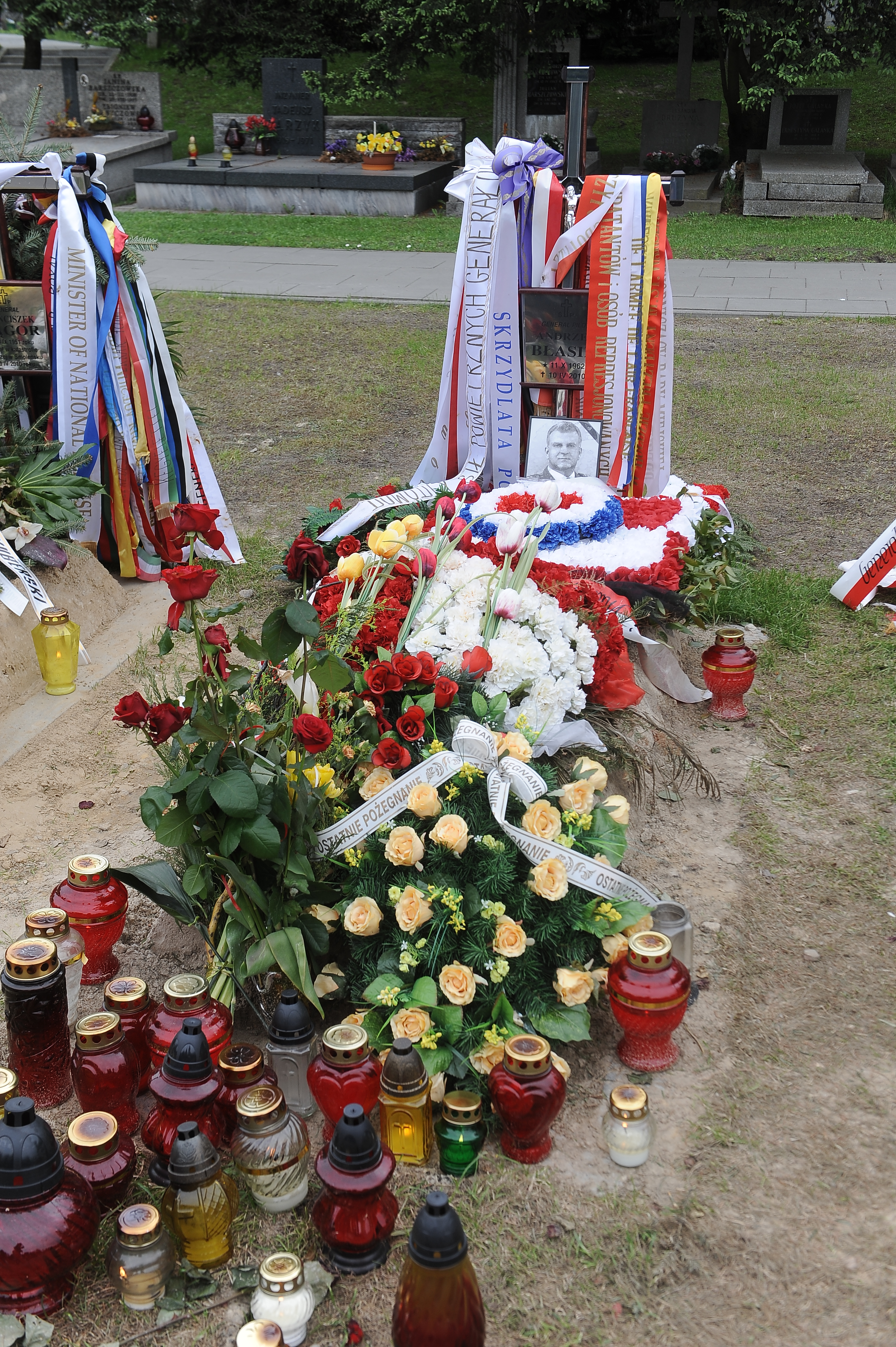
Andrzej Błasik tomb in Powązki 2010

Andrzej Eugeniusz Błasik (11 October 1962 – 10 April 2010) was a Lieutenant General in the Polish Armed Forces and a Commander of the Polish Air Force. Błasik was born in Poddębice, People's Republic of Poland. He died in the Tu-154 crash near Smolensk, Russia.

== Education ==
During 1977–1981 Błasik was educated at Aviation High School at the University Officers' School of Aviation in Dęblin. Afterwards he joined the 'School of Eaglets', gaining in 1985 the military rank of second lieutenant in the group of pilots of the passenger aviation corps.

In the period from 1993 to 1995 he studied at the National Defence University in Warsaw, after completing the diploma and he became a certified officer. He was also a graduate of the Netherlands Defence Academy in The Hague in 1998 and the Air War College in Montgomery, Alabama, United States (2005).

== Military service ==
At the first grade – a pilot – he was sent to 8 Regiment Fighter-Bomber in Mirosławiec. In 1987 he was transferred to 40 Regiment Fighter-Bomber in Świdwin, where he was a senior pilot, commander of a key officer of the squadron navigator, squadron commander and deputy commander of the squadron. Since 1995, he served in the Air Force Command, Air Force and Air Defense in Warsaw. He was successively chief inspector duties Navigation Division, Senior Inspector Department of Training and Operations Branch chief specialist.

In 2001 he became Head of Training 2 Tactical Air Brigade in Poznań, and in 2002 became commander of the 31st Air Base in Poznań. He commanded a military unit in 2003 received the "Mark of Honour of the Polish Armed Forces" for the protection of international maneuvers in "NATO Air Meet 2003". Since 2004, he was head of the Combat Applications Division at Headquarters Air Force, while in 2005–2007 he commanded the 2nd Tactical Air Brigade. On 15 August 2005 he was promoted to brigadier general. After a short time, he served as commander-rector of the School Officers of the Air Force. On 19 April 2007 he was appointed commander of the Air Force and was promoted to major general.

On 15 August 2007 he was promoted to the rank of lieutenant general.

As a pilot he had 1,300 hours total flying time. As an instructor he had the power to train in all weather conditions on airplanes Su-22 and PZL TS-11 Iskra. He also piloted the Lim-6.

== Death ==
Błasik died in a plane crash near Smolensk, in which the President of Poland Lech Kaczyński also died.

== Personal life ==
Błasik was married. He had two children.

== Awards ==
- Commander's Cross of the Order of Polonia Restituta (2010, posthumously)
- Silver Cross of Merit (2006)
- Bronze Cross of Merit (1998)
- Silver Medal of the Armed Forces in the Service of the Fatherland
- Bronze Medal of the Armed Forces in the Service of the Fatherland
- Gold Medal of Merit for National Defence
- Medal of the 100th Anniversary of the Establishment of the General Staff
- Commander of Legion of Merit (United States, 2009)
- Grand Officer of the Order of Merit (Portugal, 2008)

Military offices
Preceded by Stanisław Targosz	Commander of the Polish Air Force; 2007–2010	Succeeded by Lech Majewski
