= Armed Forces General Command (Poland) =

One of two main command bodies of the Polish Armed Forces

- Dowództwo Generalne Rodzajów Sił Zbrojnych
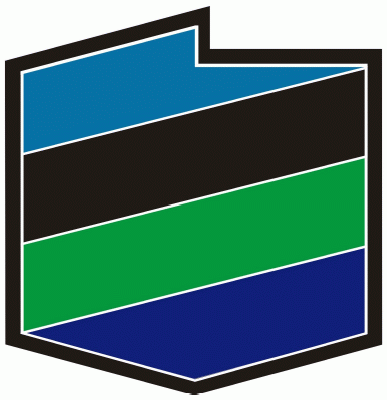
- Shoulder sleeve insignia
- Active: 1 January 2014
- Country: Poland
- Allegiance: Polish Armed Forces
- Type: joint command
- Role: Infantry
- Garrison/HQ: Warsaw

Commanders
- Lt Gen: Marek Sokołowski

Insignia
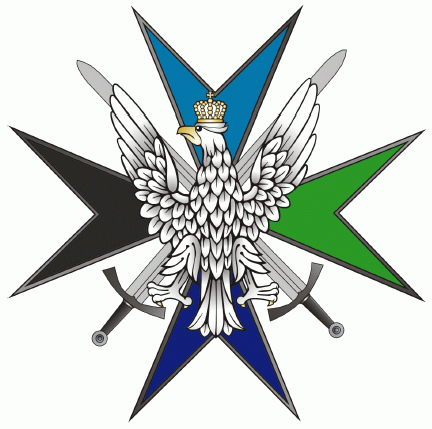
- Distinctive unit insignia

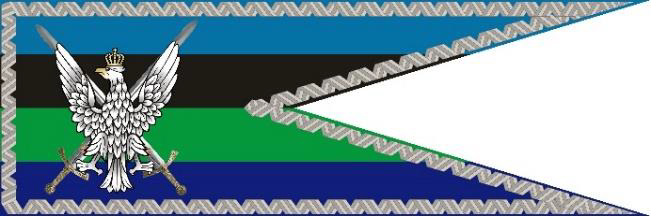
- Beret flash

The Armed Forces General Command (Polish: Dowództwo Generalne Rodzajów Sił Zbrojnych, DGRSZ) is a joint command of the Polish Armed Forces, responsible for the combat training and readiness, supply, personnel and technical complement of military units of the armed forces during peace and crisis. It holds administrative command of the units, which are transferred under the operational control of the Armed Forces Operational Command. The current (March 2023) General Commander is Lt Gen Wiesław Kukuła. It is subordinated to the Chief of the General Staff.

== Structure ==
The Command is headed by the General Commander of the Armed Forces Branches (Dowodca Generalny Rodzajów Sił Zbrojnych), a three- or four-star flag officer. He is aided by the First Deputy of the General Commander of the Armed Forces Branches (I Zastępca Dowódcy Generalnego Rodzajów Sił Zbrojnych), a three-star flag officer. Several two-star flag officers are also on the staff in the roles of a Deputy, Chief of Staff of the General Command and Inspectors of the various services.

Command (Dowództwo)

- General Commander of the Armed Forces Branches (Dowodca Generalny Rodzajów Sił Zbrojnych) - Generał / Admirał
  - Commander's Group (Grupa dowódcy)
  - Command Sergeant Major (Starszy Podoficer Dowództwa) - Starszy chorąży sztabowy / Starszy chorąży sztabowy marynarki
- First Deputy of the General Commander of the Armed Forces Branches (I Zastępca Dowódcy Generalnego Rodzajów Sił Zbrojnych) - Generał broni / Admirał floty
- Deputy of the General Commander of the Armed Forces Branches (Zastępca Dowódcy Generalnego Rodzajów Sił Zbrojnych) - Generał dywizji / Wiceadmirał

Inspectorates (Inspektoraty)

- Inspectorate of the Land Forces (Inspektorat Wojsk Lądowych)
  - Inspector of the Land Forces (Inspektor Wojsk Lądowych) - Generał dywizji
    - Armored and Mechanized Troops Directorate (Zarząd Wojsk Pancernych i Zmechanizowanych)
    - Air Mobile and Motorized Troops Directorate (Zarząd Wojsk Aeromobilnych i Zmotoryzowanych)
    - Missile, Rocket and Artillery Troops Directorate (Zarząd Wojsk Rakietowych i Artylerii) (Has oversight over the Air Force and Navy missile units.)
- Inspectorate of the Air Force (Inspektorat Sił Powietrznych)
  - Inspector of the Air Force (Inspektor Sił Powietrznych) - Generał dywizji (The inspector has oversight over the four air force wings, the missile air brigade and the radiotechnical brigade of the Air Force, but also over the army aviation brigade, the naval aviation brigade, the aviation assets of the 25th Air cavalry brigade and is also in charge of the Air Traffic Control Service of the Armed Forces (SSRL) and the Hydrometeorological Service of the Armed Forces (SSHM))
    - Air Assets Directorate (Zarząd Wojsk Lotniczych)
    - Air Operations Directorate (Zarząd Działań Lotniczych)
    - Radiotechnical Troops Directorate (Zarząd Wojsk Radiotechnicznych)
    - Coordination Department (Wydział Koordynacyjny)
    - Training Section (Oddział Ćwiczeń)
- Inspectorate of the Navy (Inspektorat Marynarki Wojennej)
  - Inspector of the Navy (Inspektor Marynarki Wojennej) - Wiceadmirał (a two-star rank in the Polish military)
    - Naval [Affairs] Directorate (Zarząd Morski)
    - Armament Directorate (Zarząd Uzbrojenia)
    - Coordination Department (Wydział Koordynacyjny)
- Inspectorate of the [specialized] Branches (Inspektorat Rodzajów Wojsk)
  - Inspector of the Branches (Inspektor Rodzajów Wojsk) - Generał dywizji
    - Command Support and Signals Directorate (Zarząd Wsparcia Dowodzenia i Łączności)
    - Intelligence and Electronic Warfare Directorate (Zarząd Rozpoznania i Walki Elektronicznej)
    - Air Defence and Anti-Ballistic Missile Defence Directorate (Zarząd Obrony Powietrznej i Przeciwrakietowej)
    - WMD Defence Directorate (Zarząd Obrony Przed Bronią Masowego Rażenia)
    - Military Engineer Directorate (Zarząd Inżynierii Wojskowej)
    - Military Medical Service Directorate (Zarząd Wojskowej Służby Zdrowia)
- Inspectorate of Training (Inspektorat Szkolenia)
  - Inspector of Training (Inspektor Szkolenia) - Generał dywizji / Wiceadmirał
    - Coordination and Training Directorate (Zarząd Koordynacji i Szkolenia)
    - Professional Training Section (Oddział Kształcenia Zawodowego)
    - Training Bases Section (Oddział Bazy Szkoleniowej)
    - Physical Education and Sport Section (Oddział Wychowania Fizycznego i Sportu)

Staff (Sztab)

- Chief of Staff (Szef Sztabu) - Generał dywizji / Wiceadmirał
  - Personnel Resources Directorate J-1 (Zarząd Zasobów Osobowych J-1)
  - Operations Directorate J-3 (Zarząd Operacyjni J-3)
  - Logistics Planning Directorate J-4 (Zarząd Planowania Logistycznego J-4)
  - Development Planning Directorate J-5 (Zarząd Planowania Rozwoju J-5)
  - Non-Kinetic Actions Directorate J-9 (Zarząd Działań Niekinetycznych J-9)
  - Implementation Planning Section (Oddział Planistyczno-Rozliczeniowy)
  - Joint Operations Center (Połączone Centrum Operacyjne)

Institutions directly subordinated to the General Commander of the Armed Forces Branches (Instytucje podległe bezpośrednio Dowódcy Generalnego Rodzajów Sił Zbrojnych)

- Special Forces Component Command (Dowództwo Komponentu Wojsk Specjalnych) - Kraków
- Armed Forces Support Inspectorate (Inspektorat Wsparcia Sił Zbrojnych) - Bydgoszcz
- 11th Lubuska Armored Cavalry Division "King John III Sobieski" (11 Lubuska Dywizja Kawalerii Pancernej im. Króla Jana III Sobieskiego) - Żagań
- 12th Szczecińska Mechanised Division "Bolesław Wrymouth" (12 Szczecińska Dywizja Zmechanizowana im. Bolesława Krzywoustego) - Szczecin
- 16th Mechanised Division "King Casimir IV Jagiellon" (16 Pomorska Dywizja Zmechanizowana im. Króla Kazimierza Jagiellończyka) - Olsztyn
- 18th Mechanized Division "Lt.-Gen.Tadeusz Buk" (18 Dywizja Zmechanizowana im. gen. broni Tadeusza Buka) - Siedlce
- 6th Airborne Brigade "BG. Stanisław Sosabowski" (6 Brygada Powietrznodesantowa im. gen. bryg. Stanisława Sosabowskiego) - Kraków
- 25th Air Cavalry Brigade "Prince Józef Poniatowski" (25 Brygada Kawalerii Powietrznej im. księcia Józefa Poniatowskiego) - Tomaszów Mazowiecki
- 3rd Ships Flotilla "Cmdr. Bolesław Romanowski" (3 Flotylla Okrętów im. kmdr. Bolesława Romanowskiego) - Gdynia-Oksywie
- 8th Coastal Defence Flotilla "VAdm. Kazimierz Porębski" (8 Flotylla Obrony Wybrzeża im. Wiceadmirała Kazimierza Porębskiego) - Świnoujście
- Gdyńska Naval Aviation Brigade "Pilot Cmdr. Karol Trzaska-Durski" (Gdyńska Brygada Lotnictwa Marynarki Wojennej im. kmdr. por. pil. Karola Trzaski-Durskiego (BLMW)) – Gdynia-Babie Doły
- 1st Tactical Aviation Wing (1 Skrzydło Lotnictwa Taktycznego) - Świdwin
- 2nd Tactical Aviation Wing (2 Skrzydło Lotnictwa Taktycznego) w Poznaniu
- 3rd Transport Aviation Wing "Col. Bolesław Orliński" (3 Skrzydło Lotnictwa Transportowego im. Płk. Bolesława Orlińskiego) - Powidz
- 4th Training Aviation Wing "Pilot BG. Witold Urbanowicz" (4 Skrzydło Lotnictwa Szkolnego im. gen. bryg. pil. Witolda Urbanowicza) - Dęblin
- 3rd Warszawska Missile Air Defence Brigade (3 Warszawska Brygada Rakietowa Obrony Powietrznej) - Sochaczew
- 3rd Wrocławska Radiotechnical Brigade (3 Wrocławska Brygada Radiotechniczna) - Wrocław
- 1st Army Aviation Brigade (1 Brygada Lotnictwa Wojsk Lądowych) - Inowrocław
- 9th Command Support Brigade of the General Command of the Armed Forces Branches (9 Brygada Wsparcia Dowodzenia Dowództwa Generalnego Rodzajów Sił Zbrojnych) - Białobrzegi
- Intelligence and Electronic Warfare Support Center (Centrum Rozpoznania i Wsparcia Walki Radioelektronicznej) - Grójec
- 2nd Przasnyski Radioelectronic Center (2 Przasnyski Ośrodek Radioelektroniczny) - Przasnysz
- 6th Radioelectronic Center (6 Ośrodek Radioelektroniczny) - Gdynia
- 2nd Hrubieszowski Reconnaissance Regiment (2 Hrubieszowski Pułk Rozpoznawczy) - Hrubieszów
- 9th Warmiński Reconnaissance Regiment (9 Warmiński Pułk Rozpoznawczy) - Lidzbark Warmiński
- 18th Białostocki Reconnaissance Regiment (18 Białostocki Pułk Rozpoznawczy) - Białystok
- 1st Brzeski Sapper [Combat Engineer] Regiment (1 Brzeski Pułk Saperów) - Brzeg
- 2nd Mazowiecki Sapper [Combat Engineer] Regiment (2 Mazowiecki Pułk Saperów) - Kazuń
- 2nd Inowrocławski Engineer Regiment (2 Inowrocławski Pułk Inżynieryjny) - Inowrocław
- 5th Engineer Regiment (5 Pułk Inżynieryjny) - Szczecin-Podjuchach
- 4th Brodnicki Chemical [NBC Defence] Regiment (4 Brodnicki Pułk Chemiczny) - Brodnica
- 5th Tarnogórski Chemical [NBC Defence] Regiment (5 Tarnogórski Pułk Chemiczny) - Tarnowskie Góry
- Central Group for Psychological Operations "King Stephen Báthory" (Centralna Grupa Działań Psychologicznych im. Króla Stefana Batorego (CGDP)) - Bydgoszcz
- Publishing House of the General Command of the Armed Forces Branches (Zespół Wydawniczy Dowództwa Generalnego Rodzajów Sił Zbrojnych) - Warsaw
- Command of the Multinational Corps Northeast (Polish part) (Dowództwo Wielonarodowego Korpusu Północno – Wschodniego) (część polska) - Szczecin
- Command Support Brigade of the MNC-NE (Brygada Wsparcia Dowodzenia Wielonarodowego Korpusu Północno - Wschodniego) - Szczecin
- Training Center for Overseas Missions (Centrum Przygotowań do Misji Zagranicznych) - Kielce
- Club of the General Command of the Armed Forces Branches (Klub Dowództwa Generalnego Rodzajów Sił Zbrojnych) - Warsaw
- Air Traffic Control Directorate of the Armed Forces (Szefostwo Służby Ruchu Lotniczego Sił Zbrojnych RP) - Warsaw Okęcie
- Hydrographic Bureau of the Navy (Biuro Hydrograficzne Marynarki Wojennej (BH MW)) - Gdynia
- Hydrometeorological Service Directorate of the Armed Forces (Szefostwo Służby Hydrometeorologicznej Sił Zbrojnych Rzeczypospolitej Polskiej (SSH SZ RP)) - Warsaw-Pyry
- Land Forces Training Center "Great Hetman of the Crown Stefan Czarniecki" (Centrum Szkolenia Wojsk Lądowych im. Hetmana Polnego Koronnego Stefana Czarnieckiego (CSWL)) – Poznań and Biedrusko
- Artillery and Armaments Training Center "Gen. Józef Bem" (Centrum Szkolenia Artylerii i Uzbrojenia im. gen. Józefa Bema (CSAiU)) - Toruń
- Engineer and Chemical [NBC Defence] Training Center "Gen. Jakub Jasiński" (Centrum Szkolenia Wojsk Inżynieryjnych i Chemicznych im. gen. Jakuba Jasińskiego (CSWIiCh)) – Wrocław
- Land Forces Training Center Drawsko "Col. Franciszek Sadowski" (Centrum Szkolenia Wojsk Lądowych Drawsko im. płk. dypl. Franciszka Sadowskiego) - Drawsko Pomorskie
- Air Force Training Center "Romuald Traugutt" (Centrum Szkolenia Sił Powietrznych im. Romualda Traugutta (CSSP)) - Koszalin
- Aviation Engineering Training Center "Pilot Col. Bernard Adamecki" (Centrum Szkolenia Inżynieryjno-Lotniczego im. płk. pil. obs. Bernarda Adameckiego (CSIL)) - Dęblin
- Navy Training Center "VAdm. Józef Unrug" (Centrum Szkolenia Marynarki Wojennej im. Wiceadmirała Józefa Unruga (CS MW)) - Lędowo
- Military Medical Training Center "BG. MD. Stefan Hubicki " (Wojskowe Centrum Kształcenia Medycznego im. gen. bryg. dr. med. Stefana Hubickiego (WCKMed.)) - Łódź
