= Fleet Admiral (Poland) =

Polish Navy rank

Admirał Floty (Fleet Admiral) is a second-highest military rank in the Polish Navy, equivalent (in the Polish Army and Air Force) to Generał broni (three stars).

This rank was introduced in 2002 and placed between Vice Admiral and Admirał (Admiral). Before this there were three admirals rank in the Polish Navy – Kontradmirał (Rear Admiral), Vice Admiral and Admiral (now highest).

As of 2008 three persons held this rank:

- Marek Brągoszewski
- Roman Krzyżelewski
- Ryszard Łukasik

This list not include those, who were Admirals, when it was highest, but "three star" not "four" rank.
