= Stanisław Targosz =

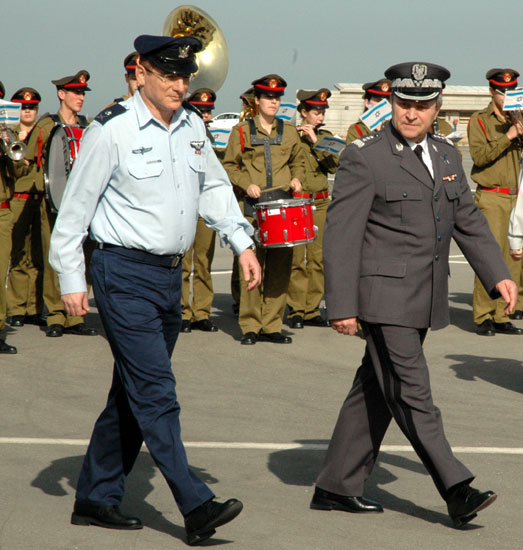
With Eliezer Shkedi during visit to Israel, March 2006

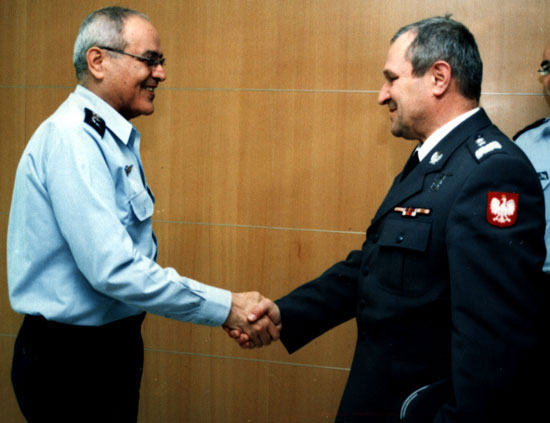
With Dan Halutz during visit to Israel, March 2006

General Stanisław Targosz (23 July 1948, in Jaroszów, Poland – 4 August 2013, in Grodzisk Mazowiecki, Poland) was a Polish general who was the commanding officer of the Polish Air Force.

On 15 August 2000, Polish Army Day, he was promoted by president Aleksander Kwaśniewski, to the rank of generał brygady (brigadier general) and soon afterwards Targosz was transferred to the NATO CAOC-1 command in Denmark.

On 18 November 2003, Targosz was transferred back to Warsaw, where he assumed the post of deputy chief of Air Operations Centre and, since 8 March 2004, the commander of that centre. On 15 August of that year he was promoted to the rank of generał dywizji (Major General). Finally, on 3 April 2005, he was promoted to the rank of Generał broni (three-star general) and became the commanding officer of the entire Polish Air Force until 19 April 2007. He was succeeded by General Andrzej Błasik.
