= Bronisław Kwiatkowski =

Polish military commander

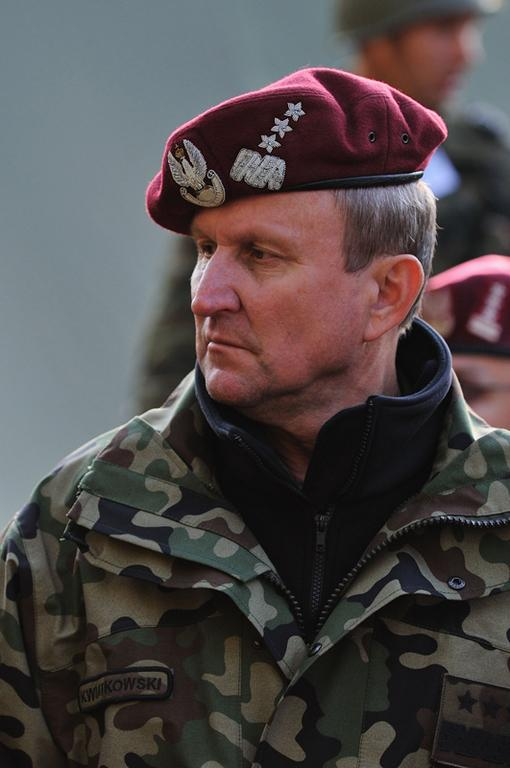
- Born: 5 May 1950; Mazury, Polish People's Republic
- Died: 10 April 2010 (aged 59) Smolensk, Russia
- Buried: Salwator Cemetery
- Allegiance: Poland
- Branch: Polish Land Forces
- Rank: Lieutenant General

Lieutenant General Bronisław Kwiatkowski (5 May 1950 in Mazury – 10 April 2010 in Smolensk) was a Polish military figure, Commander of the Polish Armed Forces Operational Command. He was among the passengers killed in the 2010 Polish Air Force Tu-154 crash.

== Awards and honours ==
He was awarded numerous civil and military awards including the Order of Polonia Restituta.

- Commander's Cross of the Order of Polonia Restituta (2010, posthumously; previously awarded the Officer's Cross and the Knight's Cross)
- Commander's Cross of the Order of the Military Cross
- Gold Cross of Merit
- Gold Medal of the Armed Forces in the Service of the Fatherland
- Gold Medal of Merit for National Defence
- Gold Medal for Long Service Award (2009)
- Commemorative medal of the Multinational Division Central-South Iraq
- Grand Officer of the Order of Merit (2008, Portugal)
- UN Medal UNDOF mission
- Instructor Parachute Badge
