= Generał broni =

Rank in the Polish Army

Generał broni (literally General of arms, general of the branch, abbreviated gen. broni) is the second highest Generals grade in the Polish Army, second only to the rank of Generał.

== History ==
On 27 March 1919, the Minister of Military Affairs, Lieutenant General Józef Leśniewski, "in order to establish the nomenclature of officer titles, established the following names in the Polish Army for generals: generał broni (general of infantry, cavalry, artillery).

On 21 April 1920, the Commander-in-Chief approved, effective 1 April 1920, the ranks of generał broni for Józef Haller, Józef Dowbor-Muśnicki, and Stanisław Szeptycki.

== Markings ==
Silver insignia: general's braid and three stars on shoulder boards and cap band; two stripes on the peak; eagles on the collars of uniform jackets and coats.

According to the 1972 dress regulations for soldiers of the Polish Army, a Lieutenant General had two 6 mm wide braids sewn side-by-side with a 2 mm gap on the peak of their garrison cap; the outer one sewn 6 mm from the edge of the peak along its entire arc. On the cap's band – a general's serpent braid 3 cm wide and 3.5 cm high. Additionally, in the middle of the cap band, in the break of the serpent braid, three stars were placed on a line parallel to the edge of the band. On the shoulder boards – a general's serpent braid 3.5 cm high placed across the entire shoulder board, 5 mm from the sleeve seam, and three stars placed along a straight line running through the center of the shoulder board. The first star was 1 cm from the serpent braid, and the second 5 mm from the arm apex of the first star to the concave angle of the arms of the second star; the third similarly.

In the Army of Congress Poland, rank was indicated by epaulets with thick bullion fringes, but no stars.

== Bibliography ==
- "Dzienniki Personalne Ministerstwa Spraw Wojskowych".
- Auerbach, Włodzimierz; Laprus, Marian, eds. (1979). Leksykon wiedzy wojskowej (Wydanie I ed.). Warsaw: Wydaw. Min. Obrony Narodowej. ISBN 978-83-11-06229-0.
- Linder, Karol (1960). Dawne Wojsko Polskie. Ubiór i uzbrojenie. Warsaw: Wydawnictwo Ministerstwa Obrony Narodowej.
- Podręcznik dowódcy drużyny; Szkol. 378/69. Warsaw: Wydawnictwo Ministerstwa Obrony Narodowej. 1971.
- Wojskowych, Ministerstwo Spraw (1920). "Przepis ubioru polowego Wojsk Polskich r. 1919". Pracownia Digitalizacji Zbiorów i Poligrafii CBW.
- Przepisy ubiorcze żołnierzy Sił Zbrojnych w czasie pokoju; sygn. Mund.–Tab. 3/52. Warsaw: Wydawnictwo Ministerstwa Obrony Narodowej. 1952.
- Przepisy ubiorcze żołnierzy Wojska Polskiego; sygn. Mund. 45/71/III. Warsaw: Wydawnictwo Ministerstwa Obrony Narodowej. 1972.
