= Tadeusz Szaciłło =

Polish military officer (1925–2016)

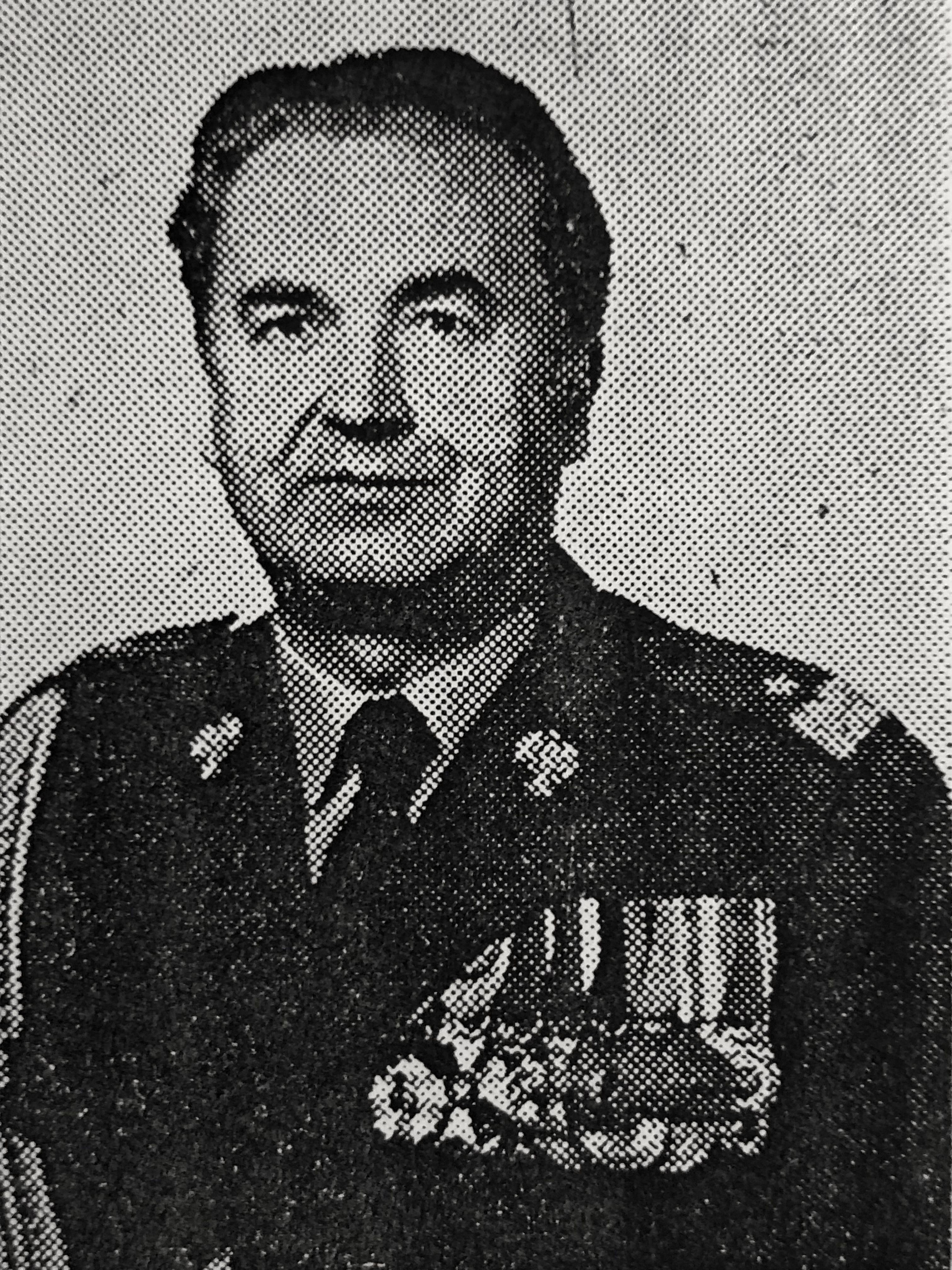
- Born: May 13, 1925; Augustów, Białystok Voivodeship, Second Polish Republic
- Died: 14 March 2016 (aged 90); Warsaw, Poland
- Burial place: Powązki Military Cemetery
- Alma mater: University of Warsaw
- Military career
- Branch: Polish People's Army
- Rank: Generał broni
- Unit: 1st Tadeusz Kościuszko Infantry Division
- Commands: Main Political Board of the Polish Army
- Conflicts: World War II

Tadeusz Szaciłło (13 May, 1925 in Augustów – 14 March, 2016 in Warsaw) was a Generał broni of the Polish People's Army, Doctor of Humanities, Lecturer and Deputy Commandant of the Military Political Academy, activist of the Polish Workers' Party and Polish United Workers' Party, Head of the Main Political Board of the Polish Army from 1986 to 1989.

== Biography ==
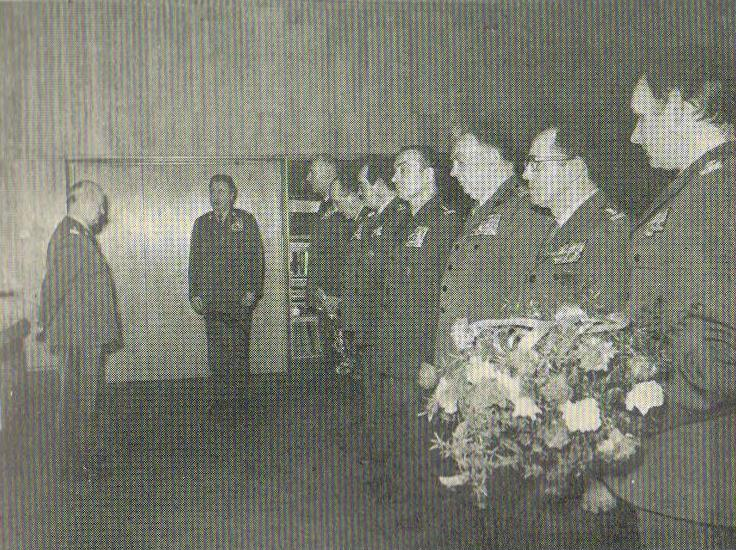
60th birthday anniversary of Lieutenant General Józef Baryła – wishes from subordinates from the political apparatus of the Polish People's Army, speech by the 1st Deputy Head of the General Staff of the Polish Army Maj. Gen. Dr. Tadeusz Szaciło, standing next to them (from the left): Maj. Gen. Władysław Polański – commander of the WAP, Brig. Gen. Albin Żyto – deputy head of the General Staff of the Polish Army, Brig. Gen. Henryk Kondas – deputy commander of the Pomeranian Military District for political affairs, Col. Stefan Rutkowski – chairman of the Party Control Commission of the Polish Army, Col. Leon Morawski – head of the Board of Publishing, Printing and Supply of the General Staff of the Polish Army; Warsaw, November 21, 1984

After graduating from primary school in Augustów, he attended junior high school, but his studies were interrupted by the outbreak of war. In the years 1941–1944, he worked as a forestry worker at the Lipowiec sawmill near Augustów.

On November 23, 1944, in Białystok, he was incorporated into the 4th Reserve Infantry Regiment in Białystok. After training, he was sent to serve as a gunner in the 1st Infantry Regiment of the 1st Tadeusz Kościuszko Infantry Division, and later to the 3rd Reserve Infantry Regiment. He followed the combat trail from Warsaw to the Pomeranian Wall, wounded in the battles for Mirosławiec.

In November 1945, he graduated from the Infantry Officer School No. 2 in Gryfice, was promoted to the rank of second lieutenant in the infantry officer corps and sent to Suwałki, to the 57th Infantry Regiment of the 18th Infantry Division as a mortar platoon commander. In 1947, he completed a course for regimental chiefs of staff at the Infantry Training Center in Rembertów (renamed the Higher Infantry School). After completing the course, he was a lecturer in socio-political sciences at the Higher Infantry School. In the years 1949–1953, he studied at the Higher Military Pedagogical Institute in Leningrad, USSR.

After returning to Poland in 1953, he was transferred to the Corps of Political and Educational Officers and was appointed senior lecturer at the Department of Pedagogy of the Dzerzhinsky Political-Military Academy in Warsaw (since 1957 the Feliks Dzerzhinsky Military Political Academy). During his further service at the WAP, he was deputy head of the Department of Theory and History of Education (1958-1963), deputy commander of the Pedagogical-Political Faculty (1963-1965) and deputy commander of the academy for scientific matters (1965-1969).

In 1962, at the University of Warsaw, he defended his thesis on Party organization as a guarantor of training successes of the Polish People's Army and became a doctor of humanities.

In 1969, he became head of the Political Directorate of the Warsaw Military District, and two years later deputy commander of the WOW for political matters. He held this position until 17 November 1973, when he was appointed head of the Second Propaganda and Agitation Directorate – deputy head of the Main Political Directorate of the Polish People's Army. In the years 1983–1986 he was the first deputy head of the Main Political Directorate of the Polish People's Army.

On 4 January 1986, at a meeting of the expanded Board of the Main Political Directorate of the Polish Army with the participation of the Minister of National Defence Florian Siwicki, he took over the duties of the head of the Main Political Directorate of the Polish Army from Lieutenant General Józef Baryła. He held this position until the institution was reformed into the Main Educational Directorate of the Polish Army. His first deputy was Vice Admiral Ludwik Dutkowski, and his deputies were generals: Tadeusz Kojder, Mieczysław Michalik, Zdzisław Rozbicki, Lesław Wojtasik and Albin Żyto.

Since 1971, a member of the Ideological Commission of the Central Committee of the Polish United Workers' Party. In the years 1986–1990, a member of the Central Committee of the Polish United Workers' Party. In the 1980s, he was also a member of the Editorial Board of the theoretical and political organ of the Central Committee of the Polish United Workers' Party, Nowe Drogi. He was also the chairman of the Reserve Officers' Commission at the Main Board of the National Defense League (1983–1986). From 1979, a member of the Supreme Council, and in the years 1985–1990, vice-president of the Main Board of the Union of Fighters and Democrats. In the years 1986–1989, he was the vice-chairman of the National Grunwald Committee and a member of the Presidium of the Main Council of Friends of Scouting. On November 11, 1988, he became a member of the Honorary Committee for the Celebration of the 70th Anniversary of Poland Regaining Independence, chaired by the First Secretary of the Central Committee of the Polish United Workers' Party, Wojciech Jaruzelski, and on November 28, he became a member of the Honorary Committee for the Celebration of the 40th Anniversary of the Unification Congress of the Polish United Workers' Party - the Polish Socialist Party - the establishment of the Polish United Workers' Party, also chaired by the First Secretary of the Central Committee of the Polish United Workers' Party.

From 27 November to 26 December 1989 he was the acting head of the Main Educational Board of the Polish Army. On 26 December he was dismissed from his position by the president Wojciech Jaruzelski. Three days later, in the presence of the Minister of National Defence, Florian Siwicki, he handed over the duties of the head of the Main Educational Board of the Polish Army to his successor, Piotr Kołodziejczyk. On 11 January 1990 he became the commandant of the Wasilewska Military Historical Institute. He held the office of the commandant of the institute until 5 July 1990, after which, due to reaching the age of 65, he ended his professional military service and retired on 22 February 1991. He was buried at the Powązki Military Cemetery in Warsaw (section FII-7-4).

== Awards ==
- Order of the Banner of Labour, Class I
- Order of the Banner of Labour, Class II
- Officer's Cross of the Order of Polonia Restituta
- Knight's Cross of the Order of Polonia Restituta
- Cross of Valour
- Gold Cross of Merit
- Silver Medal "For Meritorious Service on the Field of Glory"
- Medal for Oder, Neisse and Baltic
- Medal of the 10th Anniversary of People's Poland
- Medal of the 30th Anniversary of People's Poland
- Medal of the 40th Anniversary of People's Poland
- Medal of Victory and Freedom 1945
- Gold Medal of the Armed Forces in the Service of the Fatherland
- Silver Medal of the Armed Forces in the Service of the Homeland
- Bronze Medal of the Armed Forces in the Service of the Homeland
- Gold Medal of Merit for National Defence
- Silver Medal of Merit for National Defence
- Bronze Medal of Merit for National Defence
- Gold Badge "For Merit in Protecting Public Order"
- Silver Badge "For Merit in Protecting Public Order"
- Bronze Badge "For Merit in Protecting Public Order"
- Golden Badge "For Merit in Civil Defense"
- Golden Medal "For Merit in the National Defense League"
- Golden Decoration of Janek Krasicki
- Medal of Ludwik Waryński (1988)
- Badge of Merit for the SZMW
- Golden Badge of Honor for Merit for Warsaw (1971)
- Badge of Merit for the Rzeszów Voivodeship (1973)
- Medal for 100 Years of the Workers' Movement in Poland (1982)
- Order of the Red Banner (Soviet Union)
- Order of Tudor Vladimirescu, 2nd class (Romania, 1987)
- Medal "For the Victory over Germany in the Great Patriotic War 1941–1945" (USSR)
- Jubilee Medal "Thirty Years of Victory in the Great Patriotic War 1941–1945" (USSR, 1975)
- Jubilee Medal "Forty Years of Victory in the Great Patriotic War 1941–1945" (Soviet Union, 1985)
- Medal "For Strengthening of Brotherhood in Arms" (Soviet Union)
- Jubilee Medal "60 Years of the Armed Forces of the USSR" (Soviet Union, 1978)
- Jubilee Medal "70 Years of the Armed Forces of the USSR" (Soviet Union, 1988)
- Commemorative Badge "Veteran of the 33rd Army" (Soviet Union, 1987)
- Medal "For Strengthening Brotherhood of Arms" (Bulgaria)
- Medal "40th Anniversary of Socialist Bulgaria" (Bulgaria, 1986)
- Medal For Strengthening Friendship of the Armed Forces, 1st degree (Czechoslovakia)
- Medal "30th Anniversary of the Revolutionary Armed Forces of Cuba" (Cuba, 1987)
- Jubilee Medal "30 Years of the National People's Army" (East Germany, 1986)
- Entry in the Honorary Book of Soldiers' Deeds (1981)
