= Pawlo =

Pawlo is a given name and surname. Notable people with the name include:

- Pawlo Humeniuk, Ukrainian American fiddler from the early 20th century
- Toivo Pawlo (1917–1979), Swedish actor
