= Józef Baryła =

Polish politician and military officer (1924–2016)

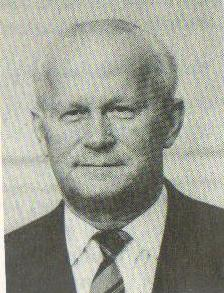
- Baryła in 1986

Member of the PZPR Politburo
- In office 1986–1988

Deputy Minister of National Defense
- In office 1980–1986

Personal details
- Born: November 21, 1924 Zawiercie, Second Polish Republic
- Died: 4 August 2016 (aged 91) Warsaw, Poland
- Resting place: Evangelical Reformed Cemetery, Warsaw
- Party: Polish United Workers' Party
- Education: Dzerzhinsky Political-Military Academy; Soviet General Staff Military Academy

Military service
- Branch/service: Polish People's Army
- Rank: Generał broni

Józef Baryła (born November 21, 1924 in Zawiercie, died August 4, 2016 in Warsaw) was a Lieutenant General of the Polish Army, Doctor of Humanities (1964), Head of the Main Political Board of the Polish Army (1980–1986), Deputy Minister of National Defense (1980–1986), Member of the Military Council of National Salvation (1981–1983), party and state activist, Member of the Central Committee of the Polish United Workers' Party (1980–1981 and 1985–1990), Secretary of the Central Committee of the Polish United Workers' Party (1985–1988), Member of the politburo of the central committee of the Polish United Workers' Party (1986–1988), Chairman of the Law and Rule of Law Commission of the Central Committee of the Polish United Workers' Party (1985–1986), Member of the Presidium of the Supreme Council of the Society of Fighters for Freedom and Democracy (1985–1990), Ambassador to Syria and Jordan (1988–1990). Member of Parliament of the Polish People's Republic of the 9th term (1985–1989). He was honoured with many decorations, including the Order of the Builders of the People's Republic of Poland and the Order of Polonia Restituta, class II, III and IV.

== Biography ==
Son of Antonina née Burzyńska and Edward. During World War II, he worked as a worker at the Glassworks in Zawiercie. He joined the Polish People's Army as a volunteer in May 1945. He was conscripted into the 21st Reserve Artillery Regiment. In the years 1945–1947, he took an active part in battles with units of the Ukrainian Insurgent Army. He graduated from the Officers' School of Artillery in Toruń (25 May 1947).

From 1947, he was a platoon commander in the 23rd Light Artillery Regiment in Bielsko-Biała. In 1949 he joined the party and political apparatus of the army. Initially, he was the head of the political and educational section in the 40th Light Artillery Regiment in Jarosław. In 1949 he moved to the position of inspector of the Political Directorate of the Command of Kraków Military District. From 1950 he studied at the Dzerzhinsky Political-Military Academy in Warsaw, from which he graduated with first place in 1953 (in 1956 he obtained a master's degree in pedagogy). In the years 1953-1955 he was deputy commander for political affairs of the Officers' Automotive School in Piła. In the years 1955-1960 deputy for political affairs of the commander of the 8th Breakthrough Artillery Division in Bemowo Piskie. In the years 1960-1968 he served as deputy head of the Propaganda and Agitation Directorate of the Main Political Directorate of the Polish Army. In 1964, while studying part-time, he defended his doctoral thesis at the Dzerzhinsky Political-Military Academy. In the following years, he completed the Operational and Strategic Course of the Military Academy of the General Staff of the Soviet Armed Forces in Moscow (1973) and the Central Course of Management Staff at the Central Committee of the Polish United Workers' Party (1977).

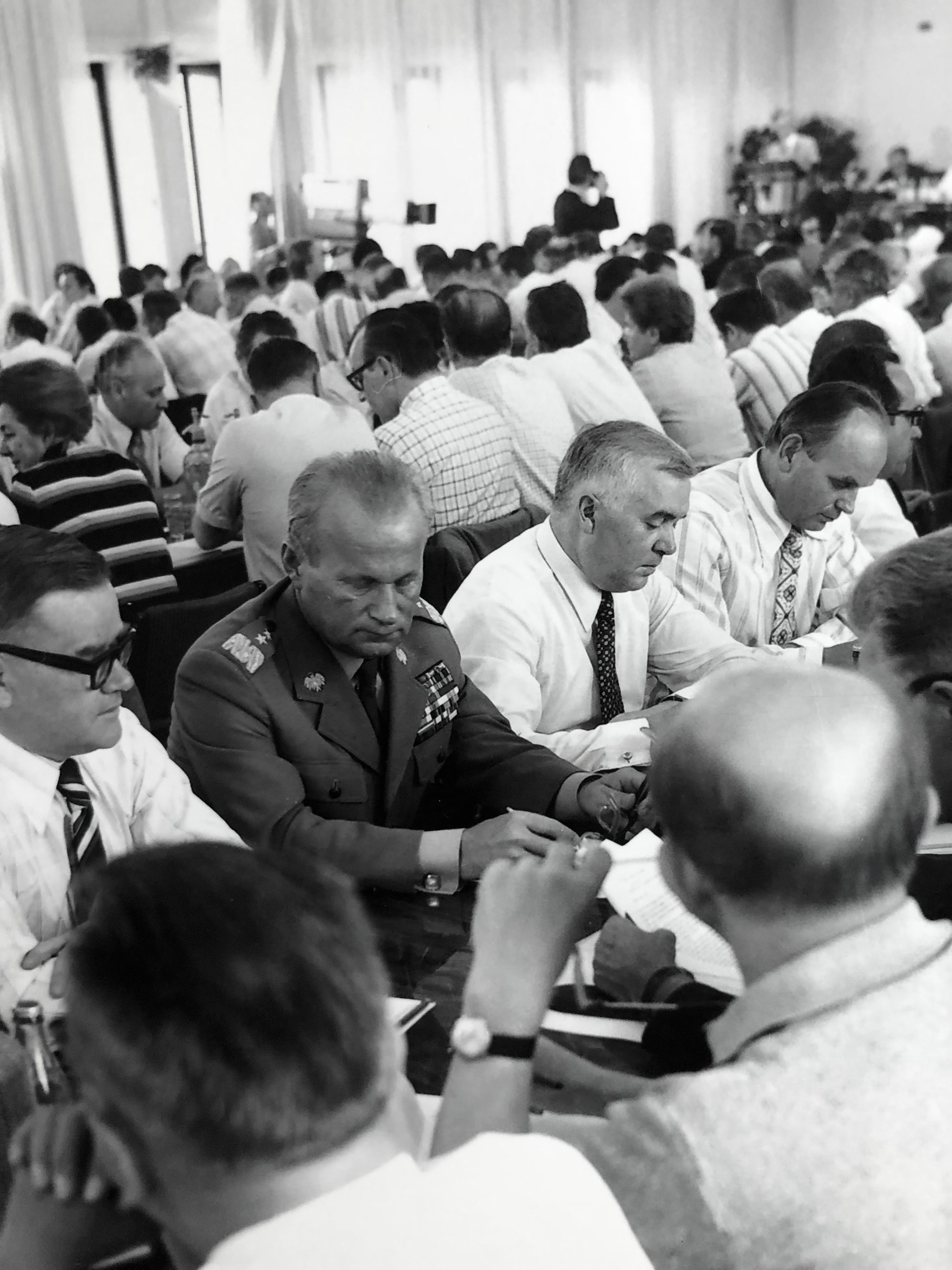
Plenary session of the Central Committee of the Polish United Workers' Party, Warsaw 1975, from the left: Deputy Minister for Veterans' Affairs Stanisław Kujda, 1st Deputy Head of the Central Committee of the Polish Army General Józef Baryła, Minister for Veterans' Affairs General Mieczysław Grudzień, Prosecutor General of the Polish People's Republic General Lucjan Czubiński

In 1968–1969, he served as head of the Propaganda and Agitation Directorate of the General Staff of the Polish People's Army. From January 11, 1969 to July 7, 1972, he was deputy commander of the Pomeranian Military District for political affairs. While in this position, on October 6, 1970, he was promoted by a resolution of the State Council of the Polish People's Republic to the rank of brigadier general. The nomination was presented on October 10, 1970, in the Belweder Palace by the chairman of the Council of State of the Polish People's Republic, Marian Spychalski.

In July 1972 he took the position of First Deputy Head of the Main Political Board of the Polish People's Army. On October 1, 1974 he was promoted by a resolution of the Council of State of the Polish People's Republic to the rank of Major General. The nomination was presented at the Belweder Palace by the Chairman of the Council of State of the Polish People's Republic, Henryk Jabłoński.

On May 7, 1980 he was appointed (in place of the dismissed General Włodzimierz Sawczuk) Head of the Main Political Board of the Polish People's Army, and on October 11, 1980 Deputy Minister of National Defense. In the years 1981–1983 he was a member of the Military Council of National Salvation. On September 24, 1983 he was promoted by a resolution of the State Council of the Polish People's Republic to the rank of Lieutenant General. The nomination was presented at the Belweder Palace on October 10, 1983 by the Chairman of the Council of State of the Polish People's Republic, Henryk Jabłoński. He was responsible for military propaganda during martial law in 1981–1983.

As head of the Main Political Directorate, he established the directions of party-political work in the armed forces, issued orders, guidelines and instructions regulating the activities of party bodies and organizations in the army. His deputies and close associates were generals: Henryk Koczara, Tadeusz Szaciłło, Albin Żyto, Władysław Honkisz, Tadeusz Kojder and Mieczysław Włodarski.

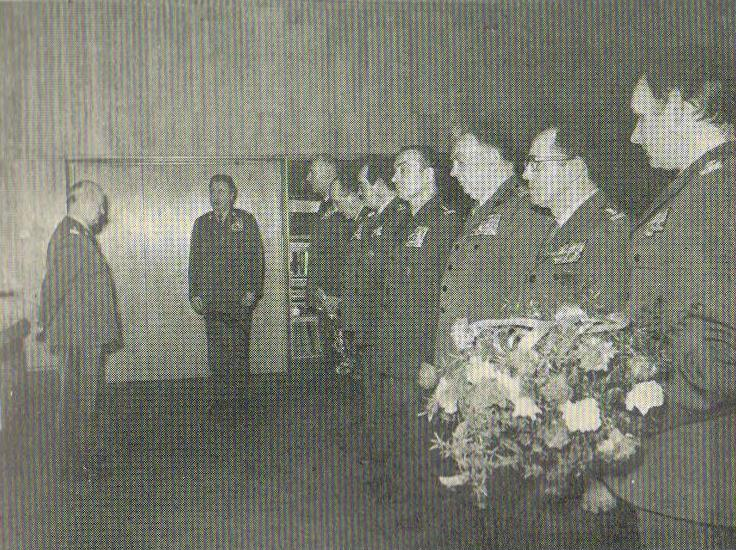
60th birthday anniversary of Józef Baryła – wishes from subordinates from the political apparatus of the Polish People's Army, speech by the 1st Deputy Head of the General Staff of the Polish Army Maj. Gen. Dr. Tadeusz Szaciło, standing next to them (from the left): Maj. Gen. Władysław Polański – commander of the WAP, Brig. Gen. Albin Żyto – deputy head of the General Staff of the Polish Army, Brig. Gen. Henryk Kondas – deputy commander of the Pomeranian Military District for political affairs, Col. Stefan Rutkowski – chairman of the Party Control Commission of the Polish Army, Col. Leon Morawski – head of the Board of Publishing, Printing and Supply of the General Staff of the Polish Army; Warsaw, November 21, 1984

In parallel with his military career, he held a number of party positions: member of the PPR from 1946, PZPR from 1948. He was a member of party bodies at various levels many times. In the years 1956–1958, a member of the PZPR executive in Pisz. In 1960, he was a member of the PZPR executive in Giżycko. In 1969, he became a member of the plenum of the PZPR Provincial Committee in Bydgoszcz. From the 6th PZPR Congress (1971), he was a member of the central party authorities: in the years 1971–1975 as member of the Central Party Control Commission of the PZPR, in the years 1975–1980 as deputy member of the PZPR Central Committee, in the years 1980–1981 – member of the PZPR Central Committee. From 1977, he was a member of the Editorial Board of Party Life. In 1981, he was a member of the so-called Grabski Commission appointed by the Central Committee of the Polish United Workers' Party to determine the personal liability of members of Edward Gierek's team. At the 9th Extraordinary Congress of the Polish United Workers' Party (July 1981) he was not elected to the Central Committee of the Polish United Workers' Party. In the years 1981–1983 he was a member of the Commission of the Central Committee of the Polish United Workers' Party appointed to explain the causes and course of social conflicts in the history of the People's Republic of Poland. On July 16, 1982, at the request of the First Secretary of the Central Committee of the Polish United Workers' Party, Wojciech Jaruzelski, he was co-opted to the Central Committee and became a deputy member of the Central Committee of the Polish United Workers' Party again, and from May 14, 1985, a member of the Central Committee of the Polish United Workers' Party again.

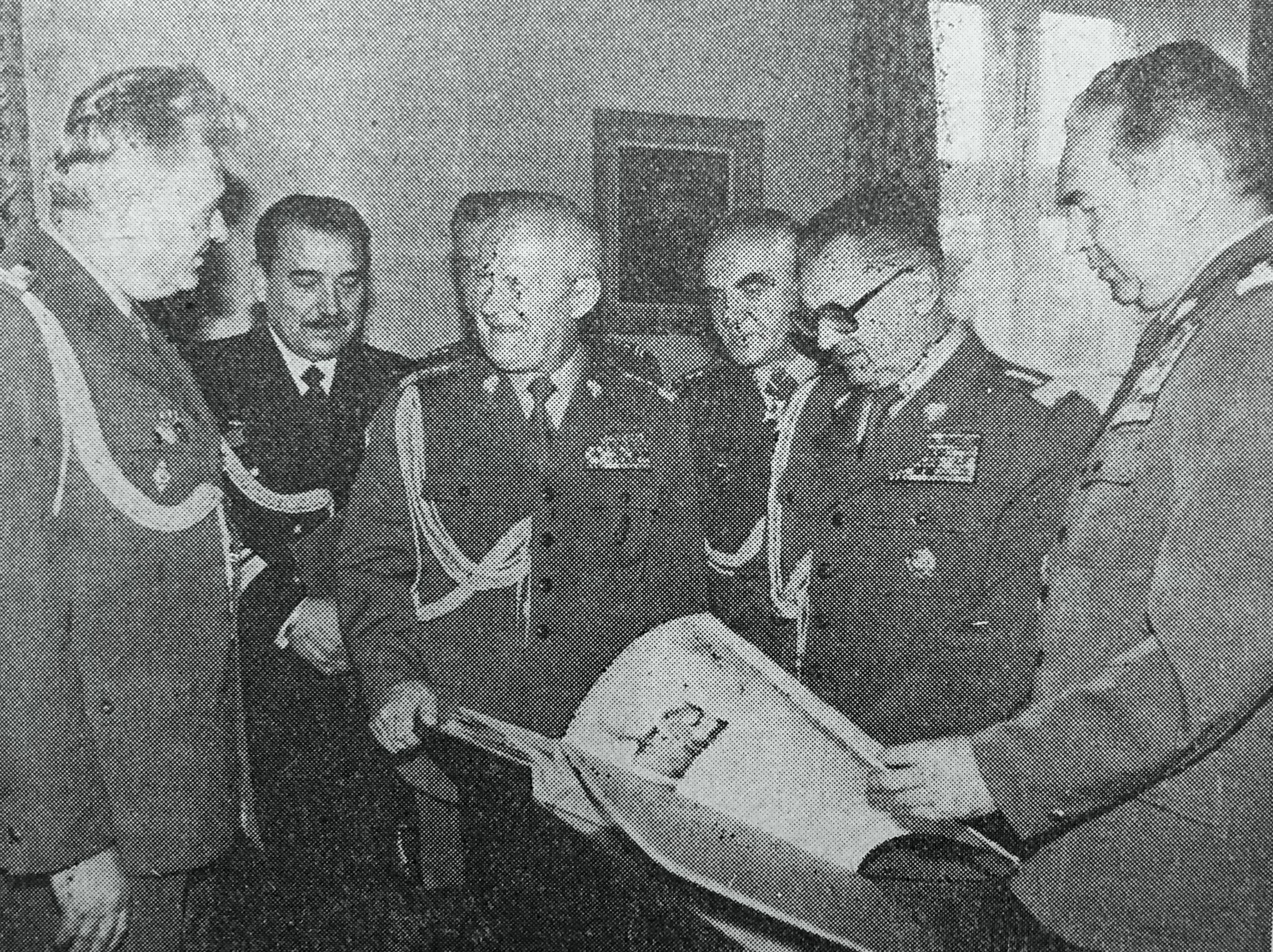
Ceremony of entry into the Honorary Book of Soldiers' Deeds in October 1985, from the right in the first row: Maj. Gen. Tadeusz Szaciłło, Army Gen. Florian Siwicki, Lieutenant General Józef Baryła and Colonel Marian Anysz

On December 21, 1985, he was elected secretary of the Central Committee of the Polish United Workers' Party. In connection with this fact, on January 4, 1986, he was taken off work from the army and ceased to be the head of the General Staff of the Polish Army. From that moment on, he was a member of the party's top leadership. As the secretary of the Central Committee, he supervised the organizational division of the Central Committee and the Ministry of National Defense and the Ministry of Internal Affairs. In the years 1985–1986, he was the chairman of the Law and Rule of Law Commission of the Central Committee of the Polish United Workers' Party. At the 10th Congress of the Polish United Workers' Party (July 3, 1986), he was elected a member of the politburo of the Central Committee of the Polish United Workers' Party.

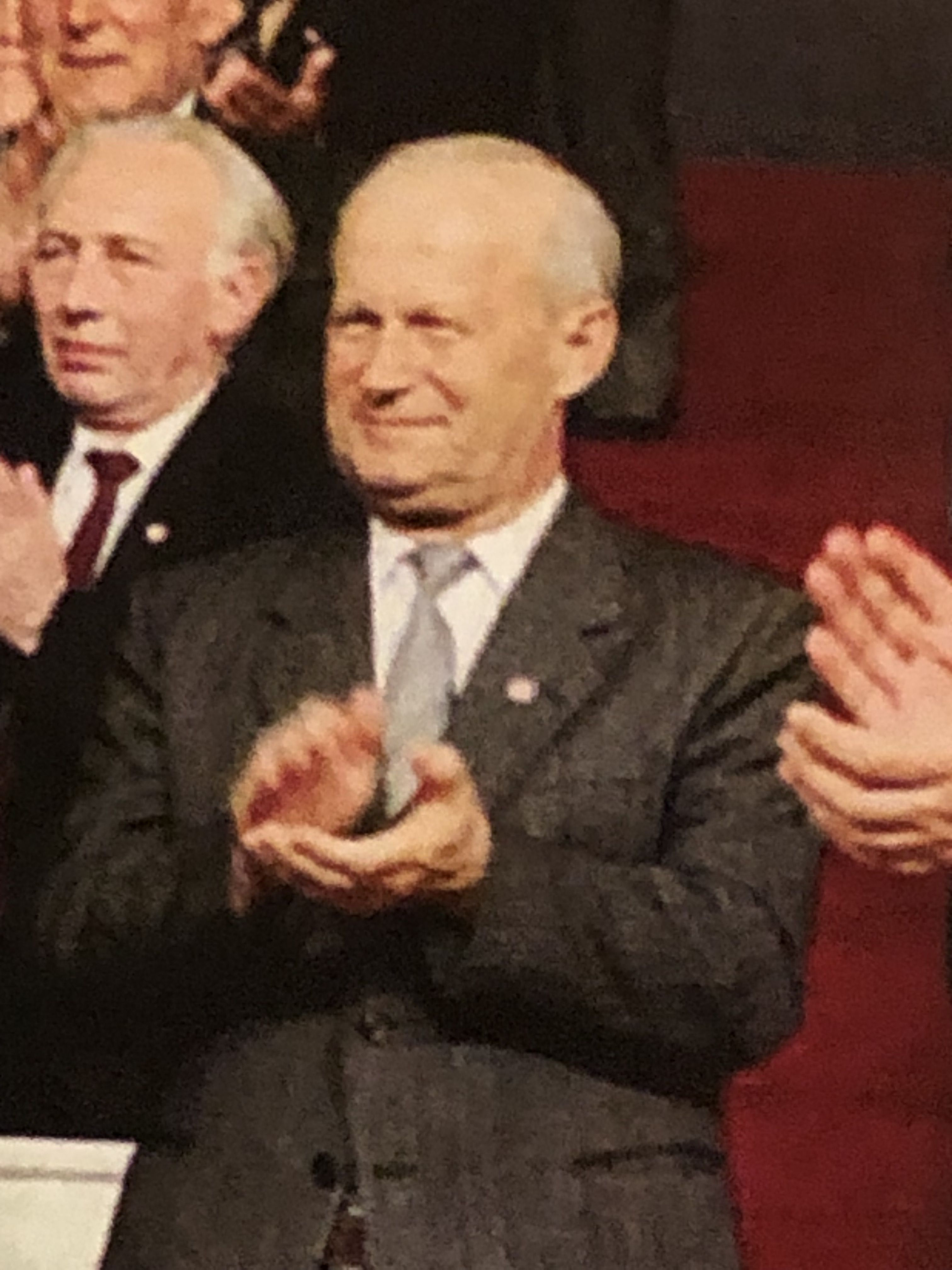
Józef Baryła in the presidium of the 10th Congress of the Polish United Workers' Party, July 1986

From July 1986 to March 1989, he was the chairman of the Committee for Intra-Party Affairs and Party Activities in Representative Bodies and State Administration of the Central Committee of the Polish United Workers' Party and the chairman of the Editorial Board of "Życie Party". He also headed the Team of the State Defense Committee for the Patriotic and Defensive Education of Society with Special Consideration of Youth. In addition, in the years 1985–1989 he was a member of the Sejm of the Polish People's Republic of the 9th term from the Bydgoszcz district, a member of the presidium of the PZPR Deputies' Club and a member of the Sejm National Education Committee. He was a long-time deputy chairman, and in the years 1984–1989 chairman of the Editorial Committee of the quarterly Historical and Military Review. In the years 1985–1990 - a member of the Presidium of the Supreme Council of the Society of Fighters for Freedom and Democracy. In the years 1983–1989 he was a member of the presidium of the National Council of the Polish–Soviet Friendship Society, and in the years 1983–1988 deputy chairman of the Citizens' Council for the Construction of the Monument to the Hospital of the Polish Mother's Health Center .

On June 14, 1988 he was dismissed from the position of secretary of the Central Committee of the PZPR. On 20–21 December 1988, during the first part of the 10th Plenum of the Central Committee of the Polish United Workers' Party, General Wojciech Jaruzelski carried out a profound reconstruction of the PZPR leadership. Six of the fifteen members left the politburo of the Central Committee: Józef Baryła, as well as Jan Główczyk, Tadeusz Porębski, Zbigniew Messner, Zygmunt Murański and Zofia Stępień (after their departure, Stanisław Ciosek, Leszek Miller and Zygmunt Czarzasty were promoted in the PZPR structures), which enabled the decision to start talks with Solidarity movement during the second part of this plenum, which took place in January 1989, to be made, which ended with the liquidation of the PZPR system of power in the Polish People's Republic. In 1982, he was among the group of military party activists awarded the medal of the 100th Anniversary of the Polish Workers' Movement by the Secretariat of the Central Committee of the Polish United Workers' Party. On November 28, 1988, he became a member of the Honorary Committee for the Celebration of the 40th Anniversary of the PPR-PPS Unification Congress – the creation of the PZPR, chaired by the First Secretary of the PZPR Central Committee.

From November 17, 1988 to September 30, 1990, Baryła served as the ambassador of the Polish People's Republic and the Republic of Poland in Syria, and from December 15, 1988 to September 30, 1990, also in the Hashemite Kingdom of Jordan. He presented his credentials in Syria on January 26, 1989, and in Jordan on June 8, 1989. After returning to Poland in September 1990, he was at the disposal of the Ministry of National Defense. He retired from service on July 3, 1991. On the occasion of the end of his professional military service, he was bid farewell by the Minister of National Defense, Vice Admiral Piotr Kołodziejczyk.

He was a member of the Polish Army Generals' Club. He died in Warsaw and was buried at the Evangelical Reformed Cemetery in Warsaw (section H-1-3). Information about his death was not made public.

== Awards ==
- Commander's Cross with Star of the Order of Polonia Restituta (1980)
- Commander's Cross of the Order of Polonia Restituta (1968)
- Officer's Cross of the Order of Polonia Restituta (1963)
- Order of the Builders of People's Poland(1984)
- Order of the Banner of Labour, 1st class (1973)[9]
- Gold Cross of Merit (1957)
- Medal "For participation in combat in defense of the people's power"
- Medal of the 10th Anniversary of People's Poland (1954)
- Medal of the 30th Anniversary of People's Poland (1974)
- Medal of the 40th Anniversary of People's Poland (1984)
- Gold Medal of the Armed Forces in the Service of the Fatherland
- Silver Medal of the Armed Forces in the Service of the Fatherland
- Bronze Medal of the Armed Forces in the Service of the Fatherland
- Gold Medal of Merit for National Defence
- Silver Medal of Merit for National Defence
- Bronze Medal of Merit for National Defence
- Medal of the National Education Commission (1974)
- Gold Badge "For Merit in the Protection of Public Order"
- Silver Badge "For Merit in the Protection of Public Order"
- Bronze Badge "For Merit in the Protection of Public Order"
- Gold Badge "For Merit in the Defence of the Borders of the Polish People's Republic"
- Gold Medal "For Merit to the National Defence League"
- Gold Badge "For Merit to the Civil Defence"
- Ludwik Waryński Medal (1988)
- Gold Decoration of Janek Krasicki
- Badge of the 1000th Anniversary of the Polish State
- Badge "For Merits to the Union of Fighters for Freedom and Democracy"
- Medal "For Merits to the Pomeranian Military District" (1970)
- Commemorative Medal "For Merits to the Warsaw Military District"
- Golden Badge of the Military Youth Circles
- Golden Honorary Badge of the Polish-Soviet Friendship Society
- Badge "Meritorious Activist of the SZMW"
- Medal for Merits to the Trade Union of Workers of Culture and Art (1979)
- Commemorative Medal "40th Anniversary of the Polish United Workers' Party" (1988)
- Medal "100 Years of the Workers' Movement in Poland" (1982)
- Golden Honorary Badge "For Merits to Warsaw" (1977)
- Honorary Badge of the City Łódź (1983)
- Medal "For Long, Devoted Service" (awarded by the Minister of National Defense, 1991)
- Order of Friendship of Peoples (1973, Soviet Union)
- Order of the Red Star (1984, Soviet Union)
- Medal "For Strengthening of Brotherhood in Arms" (1980, Soviet Union)
- Jubilee Medal "Twenty Years of Victory in the Great Patriotic War 1941–1945" (1972, Soviet Union)
- Jubilee Medal "Thirty Years of Victory in the Great Patriotic War 1941–1945" (1975, Soviet Union)
- Jubilee Medal "Forty Years of Victory in the Great Patriotic War 1941–1945" (1985, Soviet Union)
- Jubilee Medal "60 Years of the Armed Forces of the USSR" (1978, Soviet Union)
- Jubilee Medal "70 Years of the Armed Forces of the USSR" (1988, Soviet Union)
- Medal "For Strengthening Brotherhood in Arms" (1980, Bulgaria)
- Medal "30 Years of the Bulgarian People's Army" (1974, Bulgaria)
- Order of the Red Star (1985, Czechoslovakia, the order was presented by the President of Czechoslovakia Gustáv Husák)
- Medal For Strengthening Friendship of the Armed Forces, 1st class (1980, Czechoslovakia)
- Medal "40 Years of the Liberation of Czechoslovakia by the Soviet Army" (1985, Czechoslovakia)
- Medal "Brotherhood in Arms" of the Republic of Cuba (1983, Cuba)
- Golden Patriotic Order of Merit (1984, East Germany)
- Jubilee Medal "30 Years of the National People's Army" (East Germany, 1986)
- Gold Medal of Brotherhood in Arms (East Germany)
- Gold Medal of "Virtutea Ostaseasca" (1971, Romania)
- Gold Medal of Brotherhood in Arms (1980, Hungary)
- Military Exploit Order, 1st Class (1985, Vietnam)
- Medal of Friendship (Vietnam)
