= Subjunctive mood in Latin =

Grammatical mood in Latin

The subjunctive mood in Latin (coniunctivus) is a grammatical mood used to express hypothetical, unreal, or dependent actions and their temporal relationships in the Latin language. It comprises four primary forms: present, imperfect, perfect, and pluperfect subjunctive. No subjunctive forms exist for future tenses; instead, a periphrastic construction with the future participle is used. The subjunctive appears in both independent and dependent clauses. In independent clauses, it denotes unreal actions, with the specific subjunctive form indicating the speaker's stance toward the action. It is more commonly used in dependent clauses, where its form depends on the temporal relationship with the main clause's verb, governed by the sequence of tenses. The subjunctive is prevalent in various dependent clause types, such as indirect discourse, result clauses, and temporal clauses.

== Forms ==
Latin verbs can appear in one of four subjunctive forms:

- Present subjunctive (coniunctivus praesentis)
- Imperfect subjunctive (coniunctivus imperfecti)
- Perfect subjunctive (coniunctivus perfecti)
- Pluperfect subjunctive (coniunctivus plusquamperfecti)

=== Coniunctivus praesentis ===
The active voice endings for the present subjunctive are: -m, -s, -t for singular, and -mus, -tis, -nt for plural. The present subjunctive is formed as follows:

- In the first conjugation, the thematic vowel changes from -a to -e: dissimulamus → dissimulemus, sperant → sperent
- In the second and fourth conjugations, -a is added to the stem: cupit → cupiat, delent → deleant
- In the third conjugation, the vowels -i- and -u- change to -a-
- For the verb esse, the subjunctive stem is si: sim, sis, sit, etc.

The passive voice follows a similar pattern.

Conjugation examples
I	II	III	IV
restem	deleam	mittam, capiam	audiam
restes	deleas	mittas, capias	audias
restet	deleat	mittat, capiat	audiat
restemus	deleamus	mittamus, capiamus	audiamus
restetis	deleatis	mittatis, capiatis	audiatis
restent	deleant	mittant, capiant	audiant
Passive voice
rester	delear	mittar	audiar
resteris	delearis	mittaris	audiaris
restetur	deleatur	mittatur	audiatur
restemur	deleamur	mittamur	audiamur
restemini	deleamini	mittamini	audiamini
restentur	deleantur	mittantur	audiantur

=== Coniunctivus imperfecti ===
The imperfect subjunctive is formed by adding the suffix -re- to the present stem, followed by the same endings as the present subjunctive: -m, -s, -t for singular, and -mus, -tis, -nt for plural. These forms resemble the active infinitive, though historically, the coniunctivus imperfecti developed differently. The passive voice follows a similar pattern.

Conjugation examples
I	II	III	IV	esse
restarem	delerem	mitterem	audirem	essem
restares	deleres	mitteres	audires	esses
restaret	deleret	mitteret	audiret	esset
restaremus	deleremus	mitteremus	audiremus	essemus
restaretis	deleretis	mittereis	audiretis	essetis
restarent	delerent	mitterent	audirent	essent
Passive voice
restarer	delerer	mitterer	audirer	
restareris	delereris	mittereris	audireris	
restaretur	deleretur	mitteretur	audiretur	
restaremur	deleremur	mitteremur	audiremur	
restaremini	deleremini	mitteremini	audiremini	
restarentur	delerentur	mitterentur	audirentur	

For the verb esse, the imperfect subjunctive stem is esse.

=== Coniunctivus perfecti and plusquamperfecti ===
The perfect subjunctive is formed by adding the endings -erim, -eris, -erit, -erimus, -eritis, -erint to the perfect stem (third principal part). The pluperfect subjunctive uses the endings -issem, -isses, -isset, -issemus, -issetis, -issent.

Conjugation examples for perfect tense
I	II	III	IV
restaverim	deleverim	misserim	audiverim
restaveris	deleveris	misseris	audiveris
restaverit	deleverit	misserit	audiverit
restaverimus	deleverimus	misserimus	audiverimus
restaveritis	deleveritis	misseritis	audiveritis
restaverint	deleverint	misserint	audiverint
Pluperfect tense
restavissem	delevissem	mississem	audivissem
restavisses	delevisses	mississes	audivisses
restavisset	delevisset	mississet	audivisset
restavissemus	delevissemus	mississemus	audivissemus
restavissetis	delevissetis	mississetis	audivissetis
restavissent	delevissent	mississent	audivissent

The passive subjunctive is formed by combining the past participle (from the supine stem) with the present subjunctive of esse (sim, sis, sit, etc.) for the perfect subjunctive, or the imperfect subjunctive of esse (essem, esses, esset, etc.) for the pluperfect:

- amatus sim, amatus sis, amatus sit, amati simus, amati sitis, amati sint → I would be loved, you would be loved, etc.
- sublatus essem, sublatus esses, sublatus esset, sublati essemus, sublati essetis, sublati essent → I would have been lifted, you would have been lifted, etc.

== Use in independent clauses ==
The subjunctive, sometimes called the conjectural mood, is used in independent clauses to express unreality. The speaker adopts one of two stances toward the unreal action: a rational stance or a volitional stance. The rational stance is expressed as follows:

- The speaker considers the unreal action possible (coniunctivus potentialis)
- The speaker considers the unreal action impossible (coniunctivus irrealis)
- The speaker expresses uncertainty or hesitation toward the unreal action (coniunctivus dubitativus)

The negation for the subjunctive in the rational stance is non.

The volitional stance reflects the speaker's desire for the unreal action to occur, expressed as:

- Strong desire (coniunctivus hortativus, coniunctivus iussivus, coniunctivus prohibitivus)
- Gentle desire (coniunctivus optativus)
- Resignation or concession (coniunctivus concessivus)

The negation for the subjunctive in the volitional stance is ne.

=== Coniunctivus optativus ===
The optative subjunctive expresses a wish, which may be possible or impossible:

- Possible wishes about the present or future, often resembling a prayer, use the coniunctivus praesens, with non as a possible negation. For example, Vivat → Let him live! Often introduced by utinam (meaning "if only"): Utinam falsus vates sim → May I be a false prophet. Verbs like vellem, nollem, and mallem are also used.
- Impossible wishes in the present or future use the coniunctivus imperfecti: Utinam ne aeger essem! → If only I weren't sick! (spoken by someone who is sick).
- Possible wishes in the past use the coniunctivus perfecti: Utinam pater meus ibi adfuerit → If only my father were there (uncertain if he was). Impossible past wishes use the coniunctivus plusquamperfecti: Utinam illo tempore vixissem → If only I had lived in those times.

=== Coniunctivus hortativus ===
Derived from hortor, hortari (to encourage), this form expresses encouragement in the first person plural, using the coniunctivus praesentis. The negation is ne. For example, Gaudeamus igitur → Let us therefore rejoice, Ut unum sint → That they may be one.

=== Coniunctivus iussivus ===
Derived from iubeo, iubere (to command), this form is used for commands in the third person singular and plural, and occasionally in the second person as a substitute for the imperative. For example, Quidquid agis, prudenter agas et respice finem! → Whatever you do, do it wisely and consider the end!

=== Coniunctivus prohibitivus ===
Derived from prohibeo, prohibere (to prevent, forbid), this form complements the imperative mood. It is used in the first person plural and third person singular and plural with the negations ne or neve. For example, Ne timeamus neve desperamus de salute → Let us not fear nor despair of salvation. For prohibitions in the second person, the construction ne + coniunctivus perfecti is used: Ne desperaveris → Do not despair.

=== Coniunctivus potentialis ===
This form expresses possibility or supposition in the present, often in impersonal expressions using the coniunctivus imperfecti in the second person. The negation is non. It frequently appears in rhetorical questions with interrogative or indefinite pronouns as subjects. For example, Inter milites haud facile discerneres ducem → Among the soldiers, you could hardly distinguish the leader. Quis hoc credat? → Who would believe this? For past possibilities, the coniunctivus perfecti is used: Quis hoc crediderit? → Who could have believed this? Quis dubitet? → Who could doubt?

=== Coniunctivus irrealis ===
This form expresses unreal or counterfactual actions. For present actions, the coniunctivus imperfecti is used: Sine amicis vita tristis esset → Without friends, life would be sad. For past actions, the coniunctivus plusquamperfecti is used, with non as a possible negation. For example, Quid hominem vita sine doctrina esse potuisset? → What could human life have been without learning?

=== Coniunctivus dubitativus ===
Derived from dubito, dubitare (to doubt), this form expresses doubt, hesitation, or indecision, primarily in interrogative sentences. The coniunctivus praesentis is used for present actions, and the coniunctivus imperfecti for past actions, with non as a possible negation. For example, Quid faciam? → What should I do? Quo me verterem? → Where should I have turned?

=== Coniunctivus concessivus ===
This form expresses concession, indicating an action occurring despite unfavorable conditions, translated into English with conjunctions like "although" or "even though". The negation is ne. For example, Ne sit summum malum dolor, malum certe est → Even if pain is not the greatest evil, it is certainly an evil. Omnia possideat, non possidet aera Minos → Although Minos possesses everything, he does not possess the skies.

== Use in dependent clauses ==
=== Purpose and object clauses with ut ===
Both purpose and object clauses use the subjunctive, with the form depending on the tense of the main clause. Main clauses can be in primary tenses (present or future) or historical tenses (past tenses, including the praesens historicum, a present tense used to vividly describe past actions):

- If the main clause is in a primary tense, the dependent clause uses the coniunctivus praesentis:
  - Discipuli rogant, ut magister veniat → The students ask that the teacher come (object clause).
  - Cura ut valeas → Take care that you stay well.
- If the main clause is in a historical tense, the dependent clause uses the coniunctivus imperfecti:
  - Quintus foris egressus est, ut cum patre in agre laborantem loqueretur → Quintus went outside to speak with his father working in the field.
  - et ecce motus magnus factus est in mari ita ut navicula operiretur fluctibus → And behold, a great storm arose on the sea, so that the boat was covered by waves (Mat 8:24, Vulg., BT).

=== Sequence of tenses ===
The sequence of tenses (consecutio temporis) determines which form of the subjunctive mood should be used in a subordinate clause. There are two conditions that govern the use of tenses in complex sentences: the grammatical tense of the main clause and the temporal relationship of the action expressed in the subordinate clause in relation to the main clause. For the purpose of the sequence of tenses, the tenses of the main clause are divided into present and future (called the main tense) and past tenses, called historical. In the main clause, the verb may appear in various moods (indicative, imperative, subjunctive); coniunctivus perfecti, when used as coniunctivus prohibitivus or coniunctivus potentialis, is treated as a primary tense. The subjunctive in the present tense may also occur. The relation of the main clause to the subordinate clause can be simultaneous (both actions occur at the same time), anterior, when the action in the subordinate clause took place before the action expressed in the main clause, or posterior, when the action in the subordinate clause took place later than the action expressed in the main clause.

If the main clause is in a primary tense:

- Simultaneous action uses the coniunctivus praesentis: Magister rogat quid puer scribat → The teacher asks what the boy is writing.
- Prior action uses the coniunctivus perfecti: Magister rogat quid puer scripserit → The teacher asks what the boy wrote.
- Subsequent action uses the future participle with the coniunctivus praesentis of esse: Magister rogat quid puer scripturus sit → The teacher asks what the boy will write.

If the main clause is in a historical tense:

- Simultaneous action uses the coniunctivus imperfecti: Magister rogavit quid puer scriberet → The teacher asked what the boy was writing.
- Prior action uses the coniunctivus plusquamperfecti: Magister rogavit quid puer scripsisset → The teacher asked what the boy had written.
- Subsequent action uses the future participle with the coniunctivus imperfecti of esse: Magister rogavit quid puer scripturus esset → The teacher asked what the boy would write. The imperfect subjunctive may also be used.

=== Exceptions to sequence of tenses ===
Exceptions occur when the tense of the dependent clause is determined relative to the speaker's perspective rather than the main clause. This is common in result clauses. After historical tenses in the main clause, the coniunctivus praesentis expresses a result continuing to the present, and the coniunctivus perfecti indicates a past result relative to the speaker's time. The negation is non. For example:

- Siciliam Verres ita vexavit ut ea restitui in antiquum statum nullo modo possit → Verres so ravaged Sicily that it cannot be restored to its former state.

=== Mood attraction ===
In subordinate clauses that typically use the realis mood, the subjunctive may appear if the clause depends on a subjunctive clause or an accusativus cum infinitivo (ACI) construction. This phenomenon, called attractio modorum, involves mood assimilation. The negation is non. For example:

- Rex quaesivit, ubi ii essent qui nuntium victoriae attulissent → The king asked where those who had brought the news of victory were. Here, attulissent adopts the subjunctive due to the subjunctive essent in the indirect question.

=== Indirect questions ===
In indirect questions not using ACI, the subjunctive is always used, typically after verbs like querere, rogare, or scire. The negation is non. For example:

- Dic mihi, unde venias → Tell me where you come from.
- Dux perfugas interrogavit, num hostes agressuri essent → The leader asked the deserters whether the enemy would attack.

=== Subjunctive in conditional sentences ===
Present unreal actions use the coniunctivus imperfecti, and past unreal actions use the coniunctivus plusquamperfecti. Unlike some languages (e.g., English), both the main and dependent clauses use the subjunctive. For example:

- Si tacuisses, philosophus mansisses → If you had been silent, you would have remained a philosopher.
- Si hoc diceres, errares → If you were saying this, you would be mistaken.

Present potential actions use the coniunctivus praesentis, and past potential actions use the coniunctivus perfecti. For example:

- Dies mihi defuit, si omnia narrare studuerim → A day would not suffice if I tried to tell everything.
- Si hoc dicas, erres → If you should say this, you would be mistaken.

Mixed conditionals with different types are also possible.

=== Cum historicum ===
The subjunctive is typical in temporal clauses, including those with causal or resultative meanings. These follow the sequence of tenses: simultaneous actions use the coniunctivus imperfecti, and prior actions use the coniunctivus plusquamperfecti. For example:

- Cum puer librum legeret, mater ex urbe revenit → While the boy was reading a book, his mother returned from the city.
- Cum Aeneas in bello cecidisset, in locum eius Ascanius filius successit → When Aeneas had fallen in battle, his son Ascanius succeeded him.
- Qui cum audissent regem ab noodleunt et ecce stella quam viderant in oriente → Having heard the king, they departed, and behold, the star they had seen in the East (Mat 2:9, Vulg., BT).
- Vespere autem facto cum occidisset sol adferebant ad eum omnes male habentes et daemonia habentes → When evening came, after the sun had set, they brought to him all who were sick and possessed (Mar 1:32, Vulg., BT).
- Cum ergo natus esset Iesus in Bethleem Iudaeae in diebus Herodis regis ecce magi ab oriente venerunt Hierosolymam → When Jesus was born in Bethlehem of Judea in the days of King Herod, behold, wise men from the East came to Jerusalem (Mat 3:1, Vulg., BT).

== Bibliography ==
- Wielewski, Marceli (1992). Krótka gramatyka języka łacińskiego [A Short Grammar of the Latin Language] (in Polish). Warsaw: Wydawnictwa Szkolne i Pedagogiczne. ISBN 83-02-00754-4.
- Wikarjak, Jan (1999). Gramatyka opisowa języka łacińskiego [Descriptive Grammar of the Latin Language] (in Polish). Warsaw: Wydawnictwo Naukowe PWN. ISBN 978-83-01-01023-2.
- Winniczuk, Lidia (2004). Język łaciński. Podręcznik dla lektoratów szkół wyższych [Latin Language: Textbook for University Language Courses] (in Polish). Warsaw: Wydawnictwo Naukowe PWN. ISBN 83-01-11929-2.
