= Czesław Madajczyk =

Polish historian (1921–2008)

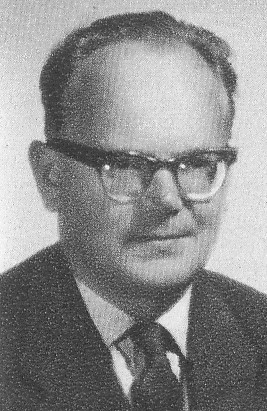

Czesław Madajczyk (27 May 1921 – 15 February 2008) was a Polish historian. His studies on the German occupation of Europe after 1938, and in particular on the occupation of Poland and on World War II Polish culture, are considered particularly important by the European scholarly community.

== Life ==
Czesław Madajczyk was born on 27 May 1921 in Jarocin. In 1947 he received a law degree from the University of Wrocław. He was a member of the Polish Socialist Party (PPS) in 1948, and then, when PPS was absorbed by the Polish United Workers' Party (PZPR), he became a member of that party. From 1954 to 1958 he taught at the Higher School for Social Sciences at Central Committee of the Polish United Workers' Party and from 1954 to 1956 at Dzerzhinsky Political-Military Academy in Warsaw. In 1963 he attained the rank of professor.

Madajczyk was an employee of the Institute of History at the Polish Academy of Sciences in Warsaw from 1956, its professor from 1963 and its president from 1971 to 1983. From 1979 he was a corresponding member of PAN, and from 1991 a regular member of the Academy. He served the Vice-President of the Polish Committee of Historical Sciences from 1971 to 1985, and one of the Vice-Presidents of the International Committee for the History of the Second World War from 1980 to 1995. In the years 1982 - 1995 Madajczyk was a member of the scientific council of the Institute of the History of Europe in Mainz. He was also the cofounder and editor of the Newest History Quarterly (Dzieje Najnowsze) and member of editorial staffs of Historical Quarterly (Kwartalnik Historyczny), Biographical Dictionary of Poland (Polski Słownik Biograficzny), Literary Monthly (Miesięcznik Literacki), Dictionary of Polish Learned Societies (Słownik polskich towarzystw naukowych), the Political Science Annual (Rocznik Nauk Politycznych). Till 1990 he was a member of the Polish-Soviet historical commission.

He died on 15 February 2008.

== Work ==
His area of specialty was the history of Poland in the 20th century, particularly in World War II. He authored over 600 publications.

Under the People's Republic of Poland, Madajczyk received two National Awards (1972, 1986), a Ministry of National Defense Award, an Award of the Scientific Secretary of the Polish Academy of Sciences, Officer's and Knight's Crosses of the Order of Polonia Restituta, and the Order of the Banner of Labour, second class.

German Professor of History at Stuttgart University, Gerhard Hirschfeld, President of the International Committee for the History of the Second World War, in his obituary praised Madajczyk as an "eminent historian, whose scholarly work on 20th Century Polish and European History has been widely acknowledged and respected" and who, through his work, enhanced greatly the understanding of German occupation policies and different experiences of people under Fascist oppression. Hirschfeld referred to Madajczyk's research on Generalplan Ost and German war plans and the Soviet massacre at Katyn as "milestones of the historiography of the Second World War". Polish historian Andrzej Friszke described him as a great scholar whose work on German occupation of Poland is fundamental. German historian Professor Karl Schlögel from Viadrina European University called Madajczyk a great historian that described the horror of German rule in occupied Poland.

Polish historian Roman Wapiński, praising Madajczyk works on the occupation of Poland, and noting their positive international reception, at the same time criticized his works that dealt with the economic history of the Second Polish Republic, and stated that they had the inevitable communist bias.

Marek J. Chodakiewicz, Piotr Gontarczyk and Leszek Zebrowski in their book Tajne oblicze GL-AL, PPR: Dokumenty criticized Madajczyk, writing that he had been "at the [Communist] party's disposal" in reference to his description of relations of Polish Workers Party (PPR) and Comintern during World War II. Polish-American historian Anna Cienciala, in a review of this work, commented: "Of course, these [Madajczyk's] statements camouflage the realities of the PPR-Comintern relationship, but they may have been the price agreed with the censor for publishing the documents in the first place." Cienciala further says that with the liberalization of Poland and the fall of communism, in 1989 Madajczyk wrote an extensive work on Soviet massacre of Polish POWs in Katyn. Hirschfeld noted that during the Cold War, Madajczyk was a vocal supporter of scholarly cooperation, breaching the Iron Curtain.

== Books ==
- Czesław Madajczyk, Polityka III Rzeszy w okupowanej Polsce (Politics of Third Reich in Occupied Poland), Państwowe Wydawnictwo Naukowe, Warszawa 1970
- Czesław Madajczyk, Kultura europejska a faszyzm (Fascism and European Culture), Warszawa 1979. German translation by Berthold Puchert of revised edition, "Die Okkupationspolitik Nazideutschlands in Polen 1939–1945", Akademie-Verlag, Berlin 1987.
- Czeslaw Madajeczyk, System okupacyjne mocy osi. Próba analizy porównawczej, w: Studia Historiae Oeconomicae, Poznan 1980
- Czesław Madajczyk, Faszyzm i okupacje 1938-1945. Wykonywanie okupacji przez państwa Osi w Europie (Fascism and 1938-1945 occupations. Maintaining Nazi Power in Europe), t. I-II. Warszawa 1983
- Czesław Madajczyk, Dramat katyński Książka i Wiedza 1989
