= Pidvolochysk =

Rural locality in Ternopil Oblast, Ukraine

Pidvolochysk Підволочиськ
- Rural settlement
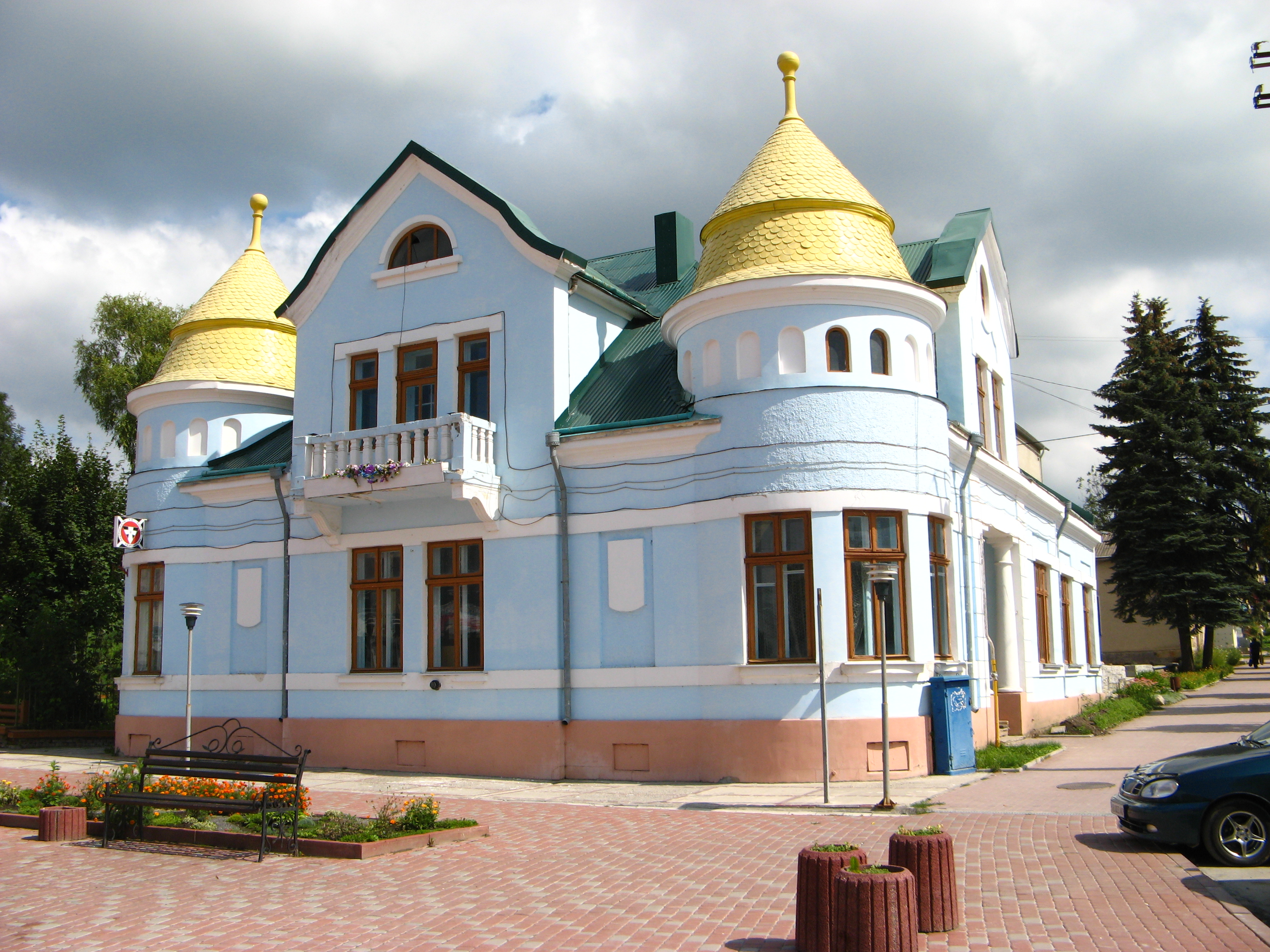

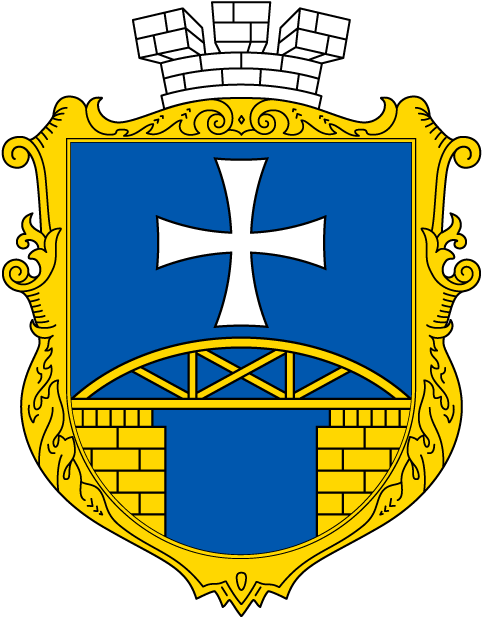
- Coat of arms
- Interactive map of Pidvolochysk
- Location within Ternopil Oblast Location within Ukraine
- Coordinates: 49°31′48″N 26°08′27″E
- Country: Ukraine
- Oblast: Ternopil Oblast
- Raion: Ternopil Raion
- Hromada: Pidvolochysk settlement hromada
- First mentioned: 1463

Area
  - Total: 9.06 km^{2} (3.50 sq mi)
- Elevation: 281 m (922 ft)

Population (2022)
  - Total: 7,632
  - Density: 842/km^{2} (2,180/sq mi)
- Time zone: UTC+2 (EET)
  - Summer (DST): UTC+3 (EEST)
- Postal code: 47800
- Area code: +380 3543

Pidvolochysk (Ukrainian: Підволочиськ, Ukrainian pronunciation: [pʲidwoloˈt͡ʃɪsʲk]; Polish: Podwołoczyska; Yiddish: פּאָדוואָלאָטשיסק, romanized: Podvolitchisk) is a rural settlement in Ternopil, Ternopil Oblast, western Ukraine. It is situated on the right side of the Zbruch River, opposite Volochysk in neighboring Khmelnytskyi Oblast. Pidvolochysk hosts the administration of the Pidvolochysk settlement hromada, one of the hromadas of Ukraine. Population: 7,632 (2022 estimate).

There are natural monuments - Pidvolochysk Well, as well as Pidvolochysk Nature Reserve, near the settlement.

== History ==
Around 1910, Pidvolochysk, the town - like the rest of the then Austrian Galicia - was part of the Austro-Hungarian Empire. Before World War II, a majority of the inhabitants were Jewish.

On 17 September 1939 Red Army units captured Pidvolochysk from Second Polish Republic, as a result of which the village was annexed into the Soviet Union as part of the Ukrainian SSR.

In July 1941, the Germans created a labor camp for the Jews. In 1942 part of the prisoners were transported to Zbaraż and Kamionka. In October 1942, the transport was sent to Bełżec extermination camp. The final annihilation of those who were left took place during the liquidation of the camp on 29 June 1943.

The Podwolocyska Organization was headed by Bernard Lerner (died 1988), later headed by Borekh Goldshteyn.) who published an account of WWII era

Until 18 July 2020, Pidvolochysk was the administrative center of Pidvolochysk Raion. The raion was abolished in July 2020 as part of the administrative reform of Ukraine, which reduced the number of raions of Ternopil Oblast to three. The area of Pidvolochysk Raion was merged into Ternopil Raion.

Until 26 January 2024, Pidvolochysk was designated urban-type settlement. On this day, a new law entered into force which abolished this status, and Pidvolochysk became a rural settlement.

It was also the birthplace (1910) of fringe Israel Scheib (later Eldad), radical nationalist Israeli politician and a leader of the anti-British Lehi underground organization.

== Notable people ==
- Efim Alexandrov, a Yiddish singer of Russia
- Israel Eldad, Jewish philosopher and member of the pre-state underground group Lehi
- Hermann Kesten, writer
- Walter Krivitsky, a defected Chekist
- Ignace Reiss, a defected Chekist
- Lidia Winniczuk, a Polish philologist and historian, a member of the Warsaw Scientific Society and a professor of the Warsaw University
- Pawlo Humeniuk, a Ukrainian American fiddler

== Gallery ==
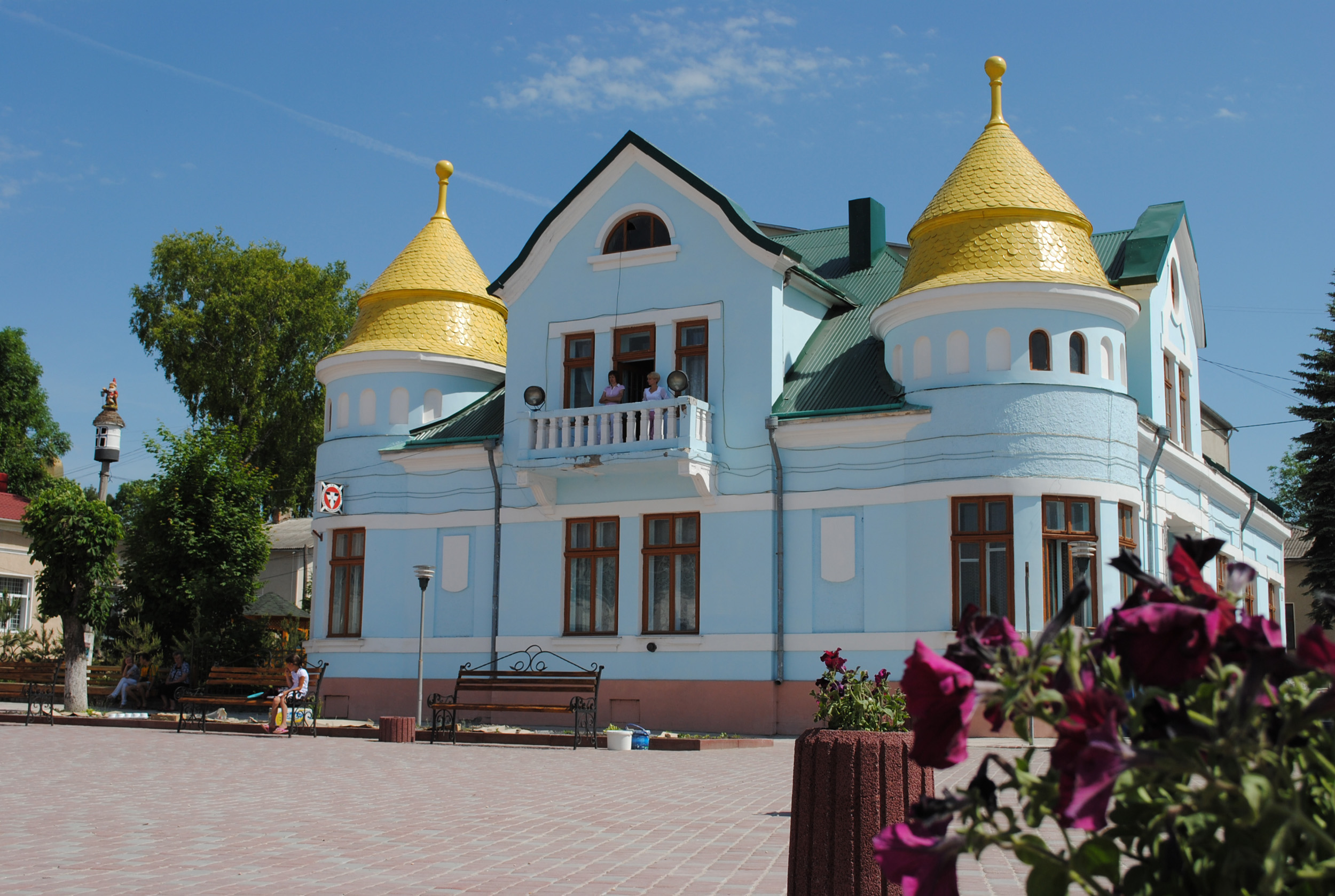
Hromnytsky villa

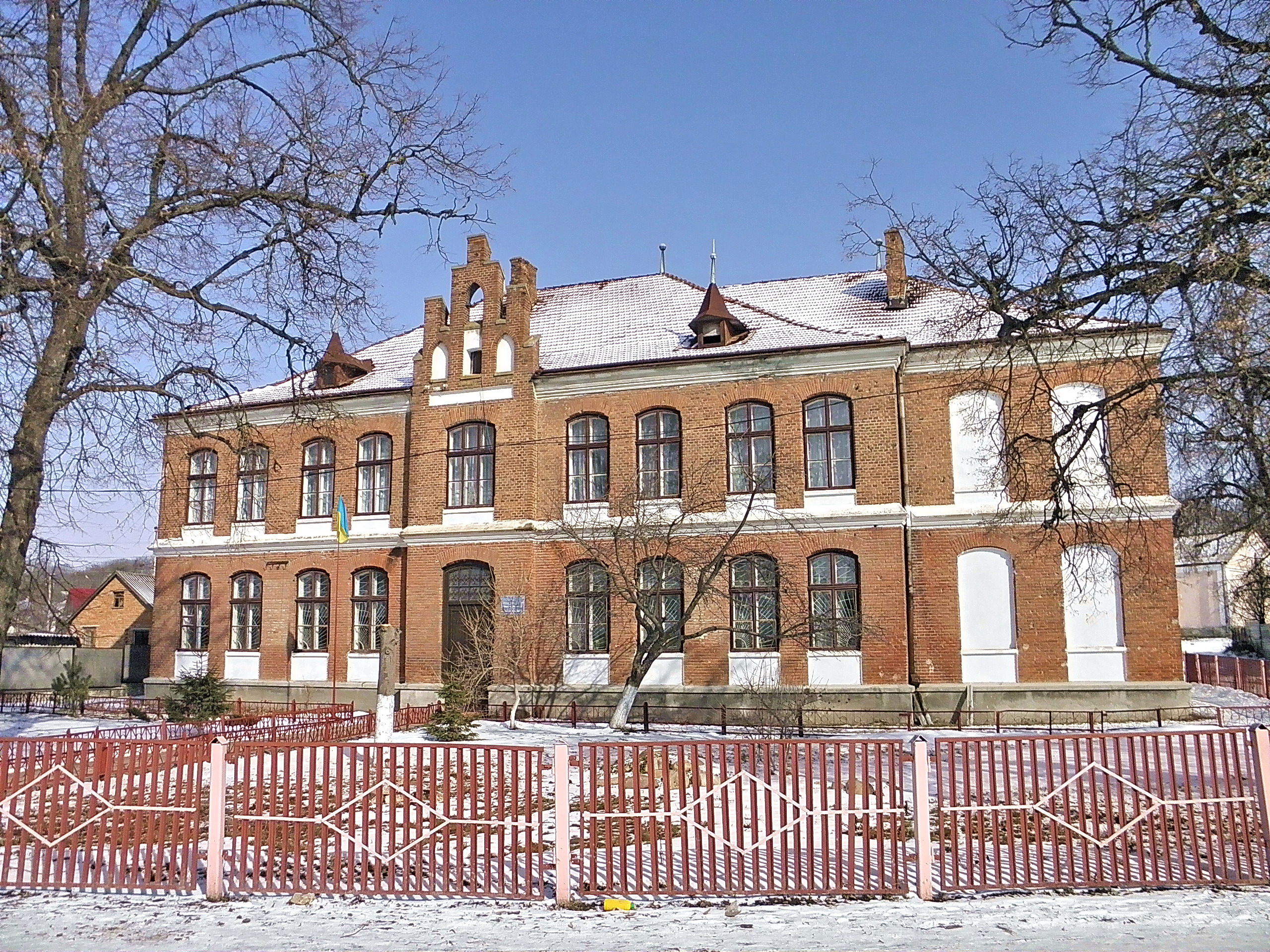
Craft School

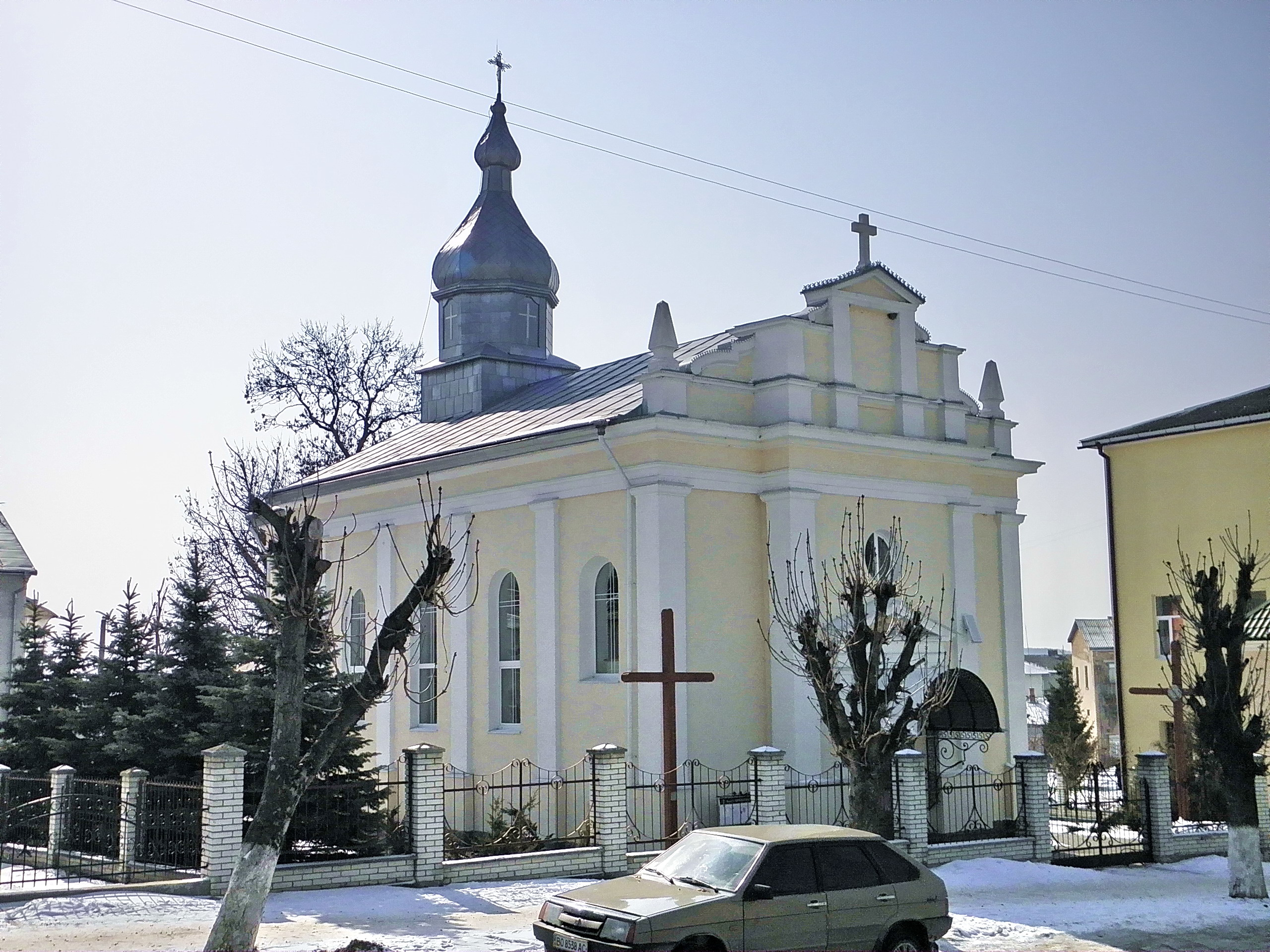
Greek-catholic Trinity Church in Pidvolochysk
