= Lidia Winniczuk =

Polish classical philologist

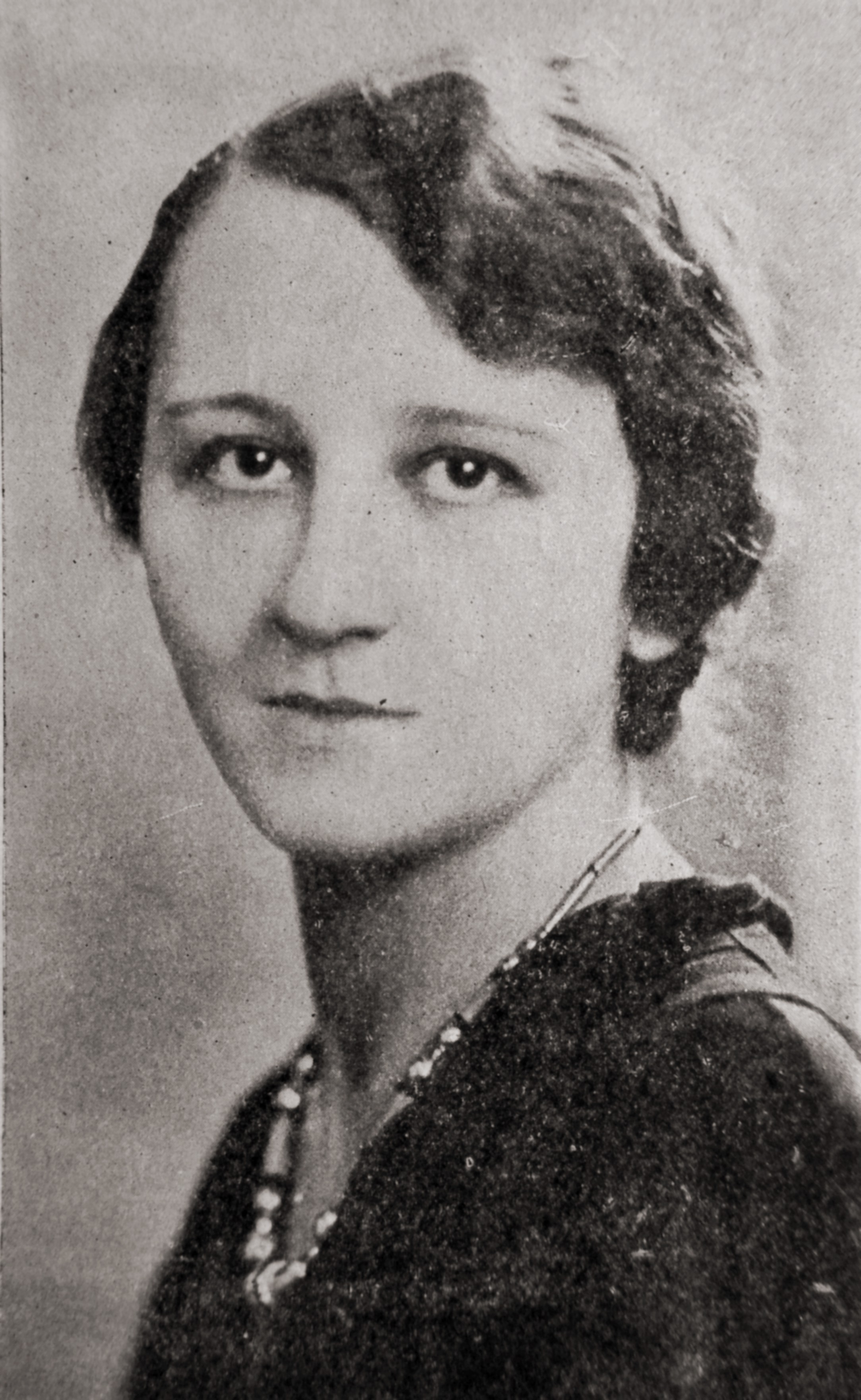
- Winniczuk, c. 1933
- Born: 17 September 1904; Podwołoczyska, Kingdom of Galicia and Lodomeria, Austria-Hungary
- Died: 31 October 1993 (aged 89); Warsaw, Warsaw Voivodeship, Third Polish Republic
- Resting place: Powązki Cemetery
- Awards: Medal of the 10th Anniversary of People's Poland

Academic background
- Education: University of Warsaw
- Thesis: Idea państwa rzymskiego u poetów augustowskich (1927)
- Doctoral advisor: Gustaw Przychocki

Academic work
- Discipline: Classics
- Sub-discipline: Philology
- Institutions: Dzerzhinsky Political-Military Academy

Lidia Winniczuk (September 17, 1904 – October 31, 1993) was a Polish classical philologist, best remembered for her textbook Lingua Latina (1975).
