= Pawlo Humeniuk =

Ukrainian American fiddler from the early 20th century

- Павло Гуменюк
- Humeniuk (bottom left) as part of the Ukrainian orchestra in 1909
- Born: June 18, 1883; Podwołoczyska, Austria-Hungary (now Pidvolochysk, Ukraine)
- Died: January 24, 1965 (aged 81)
- Other names: Paweł Humeniak
- Occupation: Fiddler
- Years active: 1925–1940
- Known for: Ukrainian American and Polish music
- Notable work: "Kanarek" (polka)
- Spouse: Antoinette Szczepanik
- Children: Walter, Mitchel, Sophie, Lucy

Pawlo Humeniuk (Note: Ukrainian: Павло Гуменюк, romanized: Pavlo Humeniuk, anglicized: Paul Homenick, polonized: Paweł Humeniak) (June 18, 1883 – January 24, 1965) was a Ukrainian American fiddler from the early 20th century who became one of the biggest stars of the era's ethnic music.

== Biography ==
Humeniuk was born on June 18, 1883 in Pidvolochysk, a village that was then known as Podwołoczyska, Austria-Hungary, and is now in Ukraine. His native languages were Ukrainian and Polish. He arrived in the United States on December 8, 1908, where he found work as a violin maker. He performed at various celebrations, such as weddings, in the New York City area.

Humeniuk was signed to Okeh Records in 1925, and began recording on December 3 of that year. His early records sold well, and included kolomyikas, kozachoks and polkas. He was the undisputed king of Ukrainian American popular music, until Columbia Records began promoting Ewgen Zukowsky. The two occasionally worked together, such as on "Ukrainske Wesilia", which is said to have sold more than 100,000 copies (though reliable records are not available from this era).

After 1926, Humeniuk began recording traditional Polish music under the name Paweł Humeniak. His influence in this field is important, as he helped develop the genre of American polka and inspired future bandleaders like Edward Krolikowski and Ignacy Podgorski. His 1928 "Kanarek" was the best-selling polka of the era, and set the standard for eastern-style polka.

Humeniuk's last recording was in 1940.

He was married to Antoinette Szczepanik. They had four children: Walter (1914–1990), Mitchel 'Mieczysław' (1916–2003), Sophie 'Zofia' (1922–1930) and Lucy (1925–1993).
