= Dzerzhinsky Political-Military Academy =

Polish Soviet style military academy

- Wojskowa Akademia Polityczna im. Feliksa Dzierżyńskiego; WAP
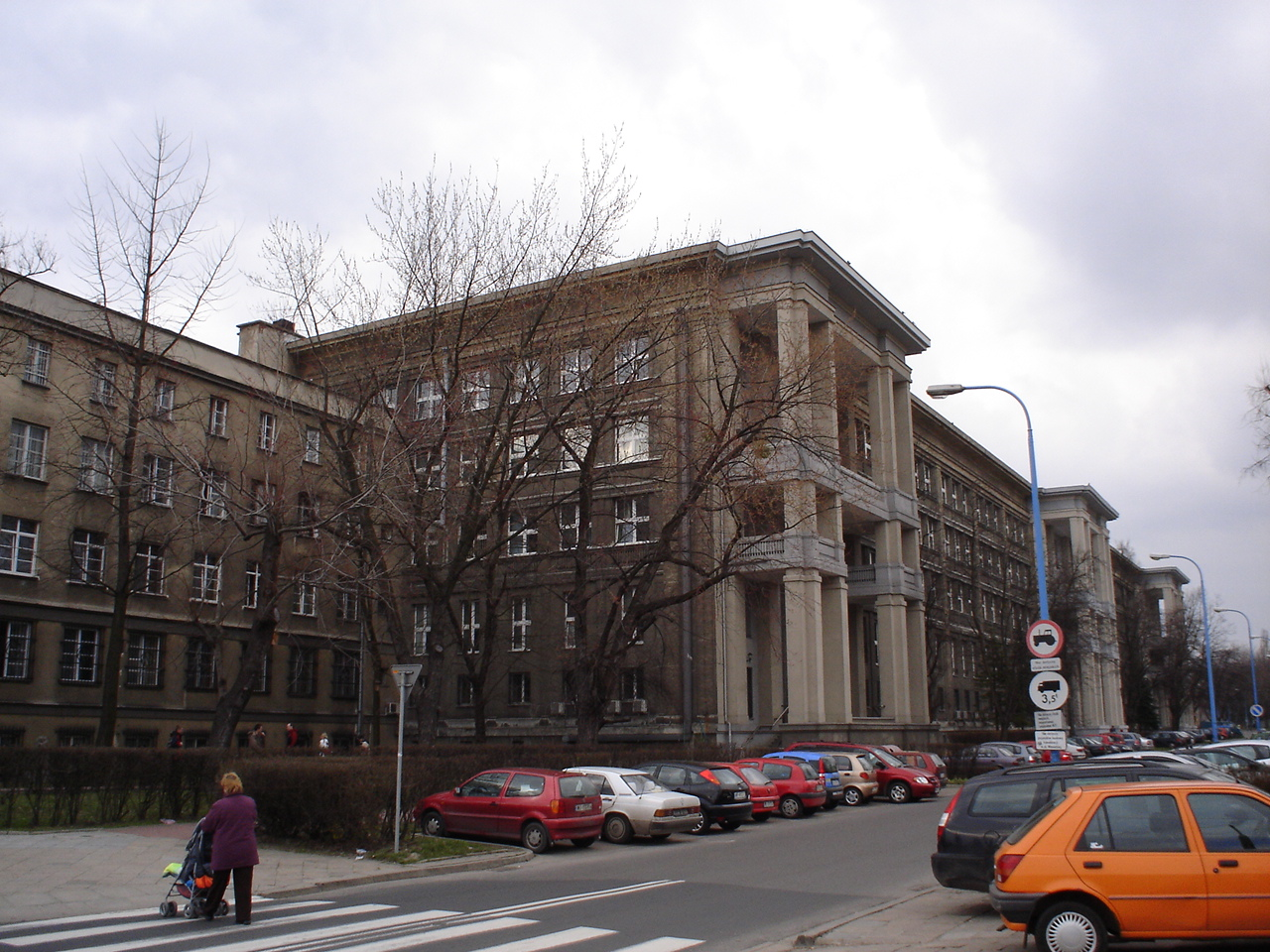
- Academy graduates on the background of the university in 1989
- Latin: Wojskowa Akademia Polityczna im. Feliksa Dzierżyńskiego
- Type: Military academy
- Active: March 22, 1951–May 21, 1990
- Location: 2 Banacha street, Ochota, Warsaw, Poland

The Felix Dzerzhinsky Political-Military Academy (Polish: Wojskowa Akademia Polityczna im. Feliksa Dzierżyńskiego, WAP) was a military academy established by the communist government, in the People's Republic of Poland. It operated in Warsaw from 1951 until 1990, and was an institution with high school status, founded for the training of higher command of military forces of Communist Poland. The alumni of the Political-Military Academy became political commissars in the Army.

== History ==
The academy was opened on March 22, 1951, in the campus that had been used by the Academy of Political Officers at Rembertów. On July 18, 1951, it was named after Felix Dzerzhinsky. Soon afterwards, it was moved to former Europejski Hotel in the center of Warsaw, and in 1954 it was moved again, to the campus of Academy of Polish Army Headquarters, located on Opaczewska Street.

The academy's structure was based on Moscow's V.I. Lenin Political-Military Academy, as the WAP's founder, Colonel Jan Hoffman, was a graduate from it. Most of its staff were officers of the former Academy of Political Officers, as well as a group of Red Army political officers. Among its lecturers were Stanislaw Kania, Tadeusz Kotarbinski, Stefan Michnik, Jerzy Wiatr, and Lidia Winniczuk.

In the first years of existence, the academy had eight faculties:

- History of Poland and Polish Workers’ Movement,
- History of the World and International Workers’ Movement,
- History of Wars and Warfare,
- History of Tactics and Headquarters,
- History of War Geography,
- History of Political Economics,
- History of Marxism–Leninism,
- History of Party and Political Work.

In 1954, the Military-Legal Faculty was added. In December 1958, the faculties of History and Pedagogy were added, and in early 1961, the Military Legal Institute was opened within the academy. In 1966, the Center of Social Studies was opened.

The academy was dissolved on May 21, 1990, and most of its campus was transferred to Warsaw University.

== Structure ==
- Command
- Teaching units
  - Faculty of Education and Politics
  - Historical and Political Department
  - Economic and Military Department
  - Military Institute of Law
  - Foreign Language Center
- Center for Social Research
- Branch of Organization and Training Planning
- Science and Research Department
- HR Department
- Finance Department
- school Divisions
- Security Sub-units

== Commanders ==
- Michał Stankiewicz (1951-1954)
- Jan Hoffman (1954-1956)
- Adam Uziembło (1956-1958)
- Józef Urbanowicz (1958-1960)
- Eugeniusz Kuszko (1960-1965)
- Edward Braniewski (1965-1969)
- Henryk Koczara (1969-1972)
- Władysław Polański (1972-1989)
- Mieczysław Michalik (1989-1990)

== Notable Professors ==
- Czesław Madajczyk
- Julian Polan-Haraschin
- Stanisław Herbst
- Jerzy Wiatr
- Jan Szczepański

== Notable alumni ==
- Janusz Bojarski
