= Members of the 2nd Sejm of the Polish People's Republic =

Polish parliament members

The Members of the 2nd Sejm of the Polish People's Republic were elected during the 1957 Polish parliamentary election, which took place on January 20, 1957. The first session was held on February 20, 1957, and the last, the 59th session, on February 17, 1961. The term of office of the Sejm lasted from February 20, 1957 to February 20, 1961.

Re-elections:

- in the electoral district no. 37 in Nowy Sącz - March 17, 1957

Bye-elections:

- in the electoral district no. 54 in Wieluń - May 5, 1957
- in the electoral district no. 36 in Myślenice - October 19, 1958
- in the electoral district no. 108 in Oleśnica - October 19, 1958

Political party affiliations at the first session of the Sejm of the second term and the status at the end of the term.

Political grouping	2nd Sejm in 1957	2nd Sejm in 1961	+/−
Polish United Workers' Party	239, (Note: Including Zbigniew Gertych (PZPR), re-elected on March 17, 1957.)	238	1
United People's Party	118 (Note: Including Wincenty Baranowski (ZSL), elected in the 1957 elections. He died before the beginning of the term.)	117	1
Democratic Party	39	39	0
Znak	8	8	0
Unaffiliated (Note: Non-party MPs who did not represent any association.)	55	52	3
Total	459	454	

== Presidium of the Sejm of the 2nd term ==
Member	Title	Party	Time in office	
Member	Title	Party	Took office	Left office
Bolesław Drobner	Senior Marshal	Polish United Workers' Party	February 20, 1957	
The Senior Marshal presides over the sessions of the Sejm before the election of the Presidium
Czesław Wycech	Marshal of the Sejm	United People's Party	February 20, 1957	February 20, 1961
Jerzy Jodłowski	Deputy Speaker of the Sejm	Democratic Party	February 20, 1957	February 20, 1961
Zenon Kliszko	Deputy Speaker of the Sejm	Polish United Workers' Party	February 20, 1957	February 20, 1961

== Party affiliation ==
=== As at the end of the term ===
Deputies of the second term were associated in the following parliamentary parties:

- Polish United Workers' Party - 238 deputies, the party chairman was Zenon Kliszko
- United People's Party - 117 deputies, the party chairman was Bolesław Podedworny,
- Democratic Party - 39 MPs, the party chairman was Jan Wende,
- Znak - 8 MPs, the party chairman was Stanisław Stomma,
- Non-partisan MPs – 52 MPs.

Members of the Polish United Workers' Party
Eugeniusz Ajnenkiel; Jerzy Albrecht; Feliks Baranowski; Władysław Bieńkowski; Stanisław Binek; Jan Bobro; Leon Brudziński; Piotr Brzóska; Eugeniusz Bula; Andrzej Burda; Aleksander Burski; Stefan Cichosz; Tadeusz Cynkin; Józef Cyrankiewicz; Antoni Czech; Paweł Dąbek; Kazimierz Dąbrowski; Witold Dąbrowski; Makary Demianovich; Ostap Dłuski; Janina Doliwa; Wit Drapich; Bolesław Drobner; Edward Drozniak; Antoni Dulemba; Józef Farny; Stanisław Fenert; Teofil Fleischer; Józef Florczak; Jan Frey-Bielecki; Janusz Fudalej; Piotr Gajewski; Jan Gałązka; Feliks Gawroński; Zbigniew Gertych (Note: March 22, 1957.); Edward Gierek; Teofil Głowacki; Władysław Gomułka; Lucjan Gonciarz; Józef Grzecznarowski; Antoni Grzywa; Ryszard Hajduk; Wit Hanke; Stanisław Hasiak; Jan Hebda; Stanisław Hertel; Ryszard Hill; Julian Hochfeld; Zygmunt Horowski; Stanisław Hudak; Jan Izydorczyk; Henryk Jabłoński; Mieczysław Jagielski; Jan Jagodziński; Zbigniew Jakus; Adam Jakuszko; Marian Jamka; Włodzimierz Janiurek; Zbigniew Januszko; Józef Jarmuł	Witold Jarosiński; Piotr Jaroszewicz; Bolesław Jaszczuk; Helena Jaworska; Marian Jaworski; Henryk Jendza; Emil Jerzyk; Stefan Jędrychowski; Tadeusz Jóźwiak; Józef Kachel; Stefan Kamiński; Franciszek Karłowski; Ludwik Karolczak; Franciszek Kempa; Feliks Kędzierski; Józef Kieszczyński; Andrzej Kisielski; Zenon Kliszko; Stanisław Klusek; Zygmunt Kluza; Jan Kłoczko; Bogusław Kogut; Wincenty Kołtun; Stefan Koper; Józef Korniluk; Edmund Kowalski; Władysław Kozdra; Kazimierz Koziołek; Edward Kozyra; Wincenty Kraśko; Stanisław Krauss; Leon Kruczkowski; Władysław Krym; Władysława Krzeszowska; Zygmunt Kucharek; Józef Kulesza; Jan Kumosz; Józef Kuropieska; Stanisław Kurowski; Alfred Kusiak; Tadeusz Kutek; Stanisław Kuziński; Kazimierz Kwiatkowski; Jerzy Lamuzga; Oskar Lange; Antoni Laskowski; Józef Lassota; Henryk Leliński; Ignacy Loga-Sowiński; Józef Łabuz; Henryk Łukaszkiewicz; Władysław Machejek; Józef Makhno; Józef Macichowski; Jan Maciejuk; Jan Maciela; Stanisław Maj; Leonard Małecki; Marian Marchlik; Stanisław Marczak	Władysław Matwin; Henryk Michalski; Władysław Mika; Stanisław Miłostan; Eugeniusz Miniszewski; Jan Miozga; Jan Mirek; Władysław Misterski; Marian Miśkiewicz; Andrzej Mnichowski; Mieczysław Moczar; Jerzy Morawski; Lucjan Motyka; Jerzy Mroczkowski; Alicja Musiałowa; Józef Nagórzański; Stanisław Niedzielski; Ryszard Nieszporek; Roman Nowak; Tadeusz Nowakowski; Kazimierz Nowicki; Wiktor Obolewicz; Edward Ochab; Jan Oliskiewicz; Jan Olszewski; Jerzy Olszewski; Józef Olszewski; Stanisław Opałka; Stefan Orczykowski; Stanisław Osiński; Bronisław Ostapczuk; Adam Palczak; Stanisław Pawlak; Władysław Pawlak; Stefan Pechcin; Jan Pernal; Zdzisław Piętka; Jan Polski; Wit Prusinowski; Edmund Pszczółkowski; Tadeusz Puskarczyk; Jerzy Putrament; Adam Rapacki; Marian Rawicki; Aleksander Reszelski; Tadeusz Robak; Wacław Rózga; Władysław Rudnicki; Edmund Rudolf; Marian Rybicki; Jan Sabik; Dymitr Sańko-Sawczenko; Balbina Semczuk; Zygmunt Seroczyński; Stefan Siekierski; Aleksy Sieradzki; Gerard Shock; Henryk Skowron; Lucjan Słowik; Dionysius Smolenski	Józef Spychalski; Marian Spychalski; Roman Stachoń; Artur Starewicz; Jan Starzyk; Eugeniusz Stawiński; Edmund Stuczyński; Władysław Surmacki; Franciszek Szałach; Włodzimierz Szczepanik; Andrzej Szczudlik; Wilhelm Szewczyk; Stanisław Szot; Ronald Szpakowski; Jerzy Sztachelski; Michał Szulc; Jan Szymański; Józef Szymański; Kazimierz Śliwa; Edmund Taszer; Michalina Tatarkówna-Majkowska; Józef Tejchma (Note: Married on November 5, 1958.); Walenty Titkow; Stanisław Tomaszewski; Leopold Topczewski; Roman Tuchowski; Wacław Tułodziecki; Franciszek Twardawa; Stanisław Ulicki; Jan Vogt; Franciszek Wachowicz; Stanisław Wais; Józef Wanat; Franciszek Waniołka; Leon Warchał; Paweł Warchoł; Jan Warzecha; Stanisław Wasilewski; Zofia Wasilkowska; Florian Wichłacz; Feliks Widy-Wirski; Tadeusz Wieczorek; Paweł Wilk; Władysław Wilk; Jan Wiśniewski; Leon Wiśniewski; Paweł Wojas; Czesław Wójtowicz; Michał Woźniak; Roman Zambrowski; Janusz Zarzycki; Aleksander Zawadzki; Stanisław Ziarkiewicz (Note: Married on February 26, 1957.); Stanisław Zieliński; Jerzy Ziętek; Stanisław Żarek; Stefan Żółkiewski; Mieczysław Żurawski
Members of the United People's Party (Poland)
Aleksander Aleksandrovich; Antoni Andreasik; Roman Arendarski; Józef Balcerzak; Kazimierz Banach; Józef Baron; Roman Bartkiewicz; Józef Berenc; Edward the White; Alojzy Biłko; Jan Bonowicz; Stanisław Cieślak; Józef Ciuba; Jan Dąb-Kocioł; Jan Drożdziuk; Bronisław Drzewiecki; Jan Dusza; Władysław Fołta; Marcin Galek; Bolesław Galiński (Note: Married on May 28, 1957.); Czesław Garbacik; Zygmunt Garstecki; Władysław Gawlik; Stanisław Gawrych; Roman Sung; Władysław Giemza; Andrzej Głowacki; Ignacy Grzywacz; Zygmunt Hagedorny; Julian Horodecki	Czesław Hudowicz; Stefan Ignar; Tadeusz Ilczuk; Władysław Jagusztyn; Bronisław Jakubiak; Albin Jakubowski; Henryk Jaroszyk; Aleksander Jaźwiński; Julian Kadlof; Kazimierz Kaniuga; Tomasz Karkowski; Tadeusz Kazimierski; Stefan Klejnik; Julian Kliś; Ignacy Konkolewski; Franciszek Korga; Antoni Korzycki; Wacław Kowalczyk; Emil Kozioł; Jan Król; Aleksander Kubicki; Łukasz Kumor; Stanisław Lejwoda; Leon Lutyk; Ferdynand Łukaszek; Bolesław Machut; Franciszek Maj; Kazimierz Maj; Eugeniusz Makowski; Tadeusz Makowski	Tomasz Malinowski; Maria Maniak; Antoni Metynowski; Kazimierz Milejski; Ludwik Naglik; Jan Porora; Stanisław Nędza-Kubiniec; Zdzisław Nowak; Józef Olszyński; Bronisław Owsianik; Józef Ozga-Michalski; Mieczysław Paczkowski; Antoni Paczoska; Jan Pasiak; Piotr Paulina; Władysław Pawlina; Franciszek Pawłowski; Wojciech Piłat; Bolesław Podedworny; Bohdan Podhorski-Piotrowski; Leon Monday; Mieczysław Porzuczek; Walter the Late; Zygmunt Prowęcki; Stanisław Rokicki; Stanisław Romanowski; Jerzy Rumianek; Jan Ryznar; Tadeusz Rześniowiecki; Wojciech Samek	Jan Schneider; Wojciech Stanowski; Ludomir Stasiak; Tadeusz Stefaniak; Władysław Stojański; Zbigniew Strzemiecki; Władysław Szatkowski; Józef Szczachor; Piotr Sznajder; Piotr Szymanek; Ludwik Szymoniak; Franciszek Śliwa; Wacław Śliwiński; Stanisław Świdurski; Anna Tarniewicz; Tadeusz Toczek; Józef Trzaska; Bronisław Warownia; Bohdan Wilamowski; Piotr Wrzeszcz; Czesław Wycech; Franciszek Zabielski; Władysław Zalewski; Zygmunt Załęski; Józef Zastawny; Stanisław Zimny; Jan Żurek
Members of the Democratic Party
Andrzej Benesz; Mieczysław Bogusławski; Józef Borecki; Stefan Brzezinski; Leon Chajn; Józef Czapski; Paweł Dubiel; Stanisław Gabryl; Władysław Gawlas; Tadeusz Gierzyński	Stefan Górecki; Michał Grendys; Jerzy Jodłowski; Jan Kowal; Eugenia Krassowska; Stanisław Kulczyński; Antoni Lebiedź; Włodzimierz Lechowicz; Zygmunt Moskwa; Marceli Najder	Zygmunt Olczak; Józef Piskorski; Jadwiga Prawdzicowa; Józef Rźny; Maria Regent-Lechowicz; Aleksander Rozmiarek; Jan Rychel; Edward Sokołowski; Stanisław Sowiński; Władysław Spychalski	Stanisław Stefański; Zofia Stypułkowska; Czesław Szczepaniak; Bolesław Szlązak; Jan Wende; Józef Wydra; Aleksander Wyrobek; Stanisław Zajączek; Kazimierz Zawadzki
Members of Znak
Stefan Kisielewski; Miron Kołakowski	Paweł Kwoczek; Zbigniew Makarczyk	Wanda Pieniężna; Kazimierz Skowroński	Stanisław Stomma; Jerzy Zawieyski
Non-partisan MPs
Ignacy Bacia; Wacław Balcerski; Stefan Batorski; Stanisław Bednarowicz; Irena Białówna; Remigiusz Bierzanek; Jan Brzoza; Jerzy Bukowski; Feliks Dobrowolski; Magdalena Dubiel; Paweł Fojcik; Mirosław Foltynowicz; Jan Frankowski	Marian Garlicki; Karol Garwoliński; Antoni Gładysz; Stefan Gołębiowski; Jerzy Hryniewiecki; Jarosław Iwaszkiewicz; Bolesław Jackiewicz; Irena Jankiewicz; Marian Jaworski; Zuzanna Josińska; Bronisław Juźków; Wincenty Karuga; Józef Kędzierski	Wacław Kiełczewski; Maciej Kononowicz; Jan Kopec; Adolf Korus; Kazimierz Król; Stanisław Kwirynowicz; Eligiusz Lasota (Note: Elected for the Polish United Workers' Party.); Elżbieta Liszka; Marian Lityński; Konstanty Łubieński; Tadeusz Meissner; Henryk Milczarek; Jan Miodoński	Konstanty Morawski; Zygmunt Nowakowski; Edmund the Ottoman; Zygmunt Piątkowski; Jan Szczepański; Konstanty Szczepański; Kazimierz Tomaszewski; Franciszek Wasążnik; Antoni Wojtysiak; Paweł Wróbel; Adam Zawadzki; Stanisław Zawadzki; Stanisław Ziemba

=== MPs whose mandate ended during the 2nd Sejm of the Polish People's Republic (8 MPs) ===
Member of the Sejm	End date of the mandate	Cause	Successor
Wincenty Baranowski (Note: The mandate expired before taking the oath.)	February 5, 1957	Died in office	Bolesław Galiński
Ignacy Skowroński	December 14, 1957	Died in office	seat left vacant
August Pieczonka	May 27, 1958	Died in office	Stefan Żółkiewski
Józef Marek	June 3, 1958	Died in office	Józef Tejchma
Michał Zając	July 13, 1958	Died in office	seat left vacant
Józef Bruski	November 5, 1958	Resigned office	seat left vacant
Aleksander Skronik	December 20, 1958	Resigned office	seat left vacant
Antoni Włudarski	June 7, 1960	Died in office	seat left vacant

== See also ==
- 1957 Polish parliamentary election

== Bibliography ==
- "Archive of Data about MPs". sejm.gov.pl.
