= Adam Rapacki =

Polish politician and diplomat

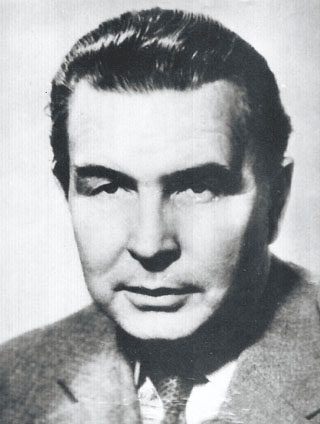

25th Minister of Foreign Affairs
- In office 27 April 1956 – 22 December 1968
- Prime Minister: Józef Cyrankiewicz
- Preceded by: Stanisław Skrzeszewski
- Succeeded by: Stefan Jędrychowski

1st Minister of Higher Education
- In office 15 May 1950 (Note: Minister of Education and Science until 31 December 1951.) – 27 April 1956
- Prime Minister: Józef Cyrankiewicz; Bolesław Bierut
- Succeeded by: Stefan Żółkiewski

2nd Minister of Shipping
- In office 16 April 1947 – 15 May 1950
- Prime Minister: Józef Cyrankiewicz
- Preceded by: Stefan Jędrychowski (Note: Jędrychowski was Minister of Shipping and Foreign Trade.)
- Succeeded by: Mieczysław Popiel

Personal details
- Born: 24 December 1909 Lviv, Austria-Hungary
- Died: 10 October 1970 (aged 60) Warsaw, Polish People's Republic

Adam Rapacki (24 December 1909 – 10 October 1970) was a leading Polish Communist politician and diplomat from 1947 to 1968. He started in the socialist movement but in 1948 joined the Central Committee of the new Polish United Workers' Party (PZPR), and became a member of its Politburo. It had very close ties to the Kremlin. He is best known for his 1957 proposal for the creation of nuclear-free zones in Europe; it was never adopted. He maintained good relations with East Germany while warning against West German expansionism. Piotr Wandycz considers that he was well educated, cosmopolitan, pragmatic, liberal and ambitious, and imbued with a sense of patriotism and belief in cooperation with the left in Western Europe.

== Biography ==
Rapacki was born by Marian Rapacki and Maria Rapacka in Lemberg, Austria-Hungary (modern Lviv, Ukraine) on 24 December 1909. Due the start of World War I, he and his parents moved to Piotrków Trybunalski, and to Warsaw in 1919. During his early life in the city, he attended gymnasium from 1920 to 1929, and the SGH Warsaw School of Economics from 1929 to 1931. In 1931, he joined the Union of Independent Socialist Youth, a Socialist group operating in Warsaw.

After graduating university in 1932, he joined the 28th Infantry Division, and continuing his career in the Union, he shortly became a member of its council. He often took part in fights with the National Radical Camp and demonstrations. Recruited to the army on 24 August 1939, he fought in the invasion of Poland by Germany as a second lieutenant and the leader of a platoon in the 36th Infantry Regiment of the Academic League. He was taken into captivity on 22 September near the Modlin Fortress and spent the rest of World War II in prisoner-of-war camps. Rapacki engaged in many rebellious activities, such as writing anti-Nazi books and secret newspapers, joined leftist groups and learnt Russian. Freed in April 1945, he returned to Poland in July.

He joined the Polish Socialist Party in August 1945 and moved to Warsaw in January 1946. In August, along with a group of Polish socialists, he entered the party's Central Committee. He joined the preparation for the upcoming elections to the Legislative Sejm, and during the 1947 Polish legislative election, he was appointed an envoy. He was appointed Minister of Shipping on 16 April 1947. From 11 January to 15 December 1948, he played an important role in the PSP. He then was elected as part of the Politburo of the Polish United Workers' Party.

During his term as the Minister of Shipping, he focused mainly on rebuilding and expanding the trading fleet. He was Minister of Higher Education (Higher Education and Science to 1951) from 1950 to 1956.

From 1956 to 1968, he was the foreign minister in the cabinet of Józef Cyrankiewicz. As a Foreign Minister, he was especially close to the director-general of the Foreign Ministry, Przemysław Ogrodziński, a man whose background as a socialist turned communist was precisely as same as his. Ogrodziński served as his principal adviser.

As Foreign Minister, Rapacki was considered be one of the leaders of the liberalising wing of the United Workers' Party that was known for favouring an ease of repression and censorship, which gave him a certain popularity.

Radio Free Europe, a radio station owned by the American government had making claims throughout the 1950s that the US stood behind the "rollback" of Communism and promised the peoples of Eastern Europeans that if they rose up against their communist regimes, the Americand would intervene with military force. In 1956, the Hungarians followed the advice of Radio Free Europe and rose up, only to be crushed by the Red Army: the US did not intervene for fear of causing a nuclear war with the Soviet Union. From the Polish perspective, the hollowness of the claims of Radio Free Europe, together with crushing of the Hungarian uprising, showed there was no point in trying to overthrow the communist regime, and the best that could be done at present was to improve the it. At the same time, the Polish October uprising, which seen the Stalinist leadership in Warsaw overthrown by a reformist faction of the United Workers's People over the face of Soviet objections, gave hope that Poland would become more independent.

The principal concerns of Polish foreign policy in the 1950s was the rejection by the West German government of the Oder-Neisse line as Germany's eastern frontier and the claim that all areas of Poland that had been part of Germany in 1937 were being illegally occupied by Poland. In 1955, at a meeting of the NATO Council, the West German government requested for the Bundeswehr to be armed with nuclear weapons, a request that caused much alarm in Warsaw.

The 1956 Suez Crisis revealed the unity of the West were less than what it had proclaimed. That certainly gave Rapacki hope that disagreements between Britain and France with the United States might be exploited by Polish diplomacy to achieve its goals, the most important of which was to prevent West Germany from acquiring nuclear weapons, which might someday be used against Poland.

On 2 October 1957, he presented at the United Nations his plan for a nuclear-free zone in Central Europe (comprising Czechoslovakia, Poland, East and West Germany), known as the "Rapacki Plan". The West rejected the plan because it feared the massive conventional forces in the East.

Rapacki died in Warsaw, aged 60, on 10 October 1970.

== Awards and decorations ==
- Order of the Builders of People's Poland (1964)
- Order of the Banner of Labour, 1st Class
- Medal of the 10th Anniversary of People's Poland
- Badge of the 1000th Anniversary of the Polish State
- Grand Cross of the Order of the Southern Cross (Brazil)
- Grand Cross of the Ordre national du Mérite (France, 1967)
- Grand Officer of the Order of Merit of the Italian Republic (Italy, 1965)
- Order of the National Flag, 1st Class (North Korea, 1954)
- Order of the People's Republic of Bulgaria, 1st Class (Bulgaria, 1967)

== See also ==
- List of Poles

== Bibliography ==
- Ozinga, James R., The Rapacki Plan: the 1957 Proposal to Denuclearize Central Europe, and an Analysis of Its Rejection, Jefferson, NC, McFarland & Co, 1989, ISBN 0-89950-445-0.
- Rapacki, Adam. "The Polish Plan for a Nuclear-Free Zone Today" International Affairs 39#1 pp. 1–12 online, a primary source.
- Stefancic, David. "The Rapacki Plan: A Case Study of European Diplomacy." East European Quarterly 21.4 (1987): 401–412.
- Wandycz, Piotr (1994). "Adam Rapacki and the Search for European Security". In Craig, Gordon A.; Loewenheim, Francis L. (eds.). The Diplomats, 1939-1979. Princeton: Princeton University Press. pp. 289–318. doi:10.2307/j.ctv8pz9nc.15. ISBN 0691194467. S2CID 188856833.
