= Politburo of the Polish United Workers' Party =

The Politburo was the highest political organ of the Central Committee of the Polish United Workers' Party, which existed from 1948 to 1990. The Politburo typically had between 9 and 15 members at any one time. Usually, several alternates (or candidates) were also elected to the Politburo, but unlike members, alternates did not possess voting rights.

The predecessor of the PUWP was the Polish Workers' Party (Polska Partia Robotnicza). In 1948, it merged with the Polish Socialist Party to form the PUWP. A chronological list of Politburo membership is provided below.

== Politburo of the Polish Workers' Party, 1944–1948 ==
Date	Member	From	To
Initial Committee August 1944 – December 1945	Władysław Gomułka	August 1944	
Initial Committee August 1944 – December 1945	Bolesław Bierut	August 1944	
Initial Committee August 1944 – December 1945	Jakub Berman	August 1944	
Initial Committee August 1944 – December 1945	Hilary Minc	August 1944	
Initial Committee August 1944 – December 1945	Aleksander Zawadzki	August 1944	
Initial Committee August 1944 – December 1945	Marian Spychalski	May 1945	
Initial Committee August 1944 – December 1945	Roman Zambrowski	August 1945	
1st Party Congress 6–13 December 1945	Władysław Gomułka	12 December 1945	3 September 1948
1st Party Congress 6–13 December 1945	Bolesław Bierut	12 December 1945	
1st Party Congress 6–13 December 1945	Jakub Berman	12 December 1945	
1st Party Congress 6–13 December 1945	Hilary Minc	12 December 1945	
1st Party Congress 6–13 December 1945	Aleksander Zawadzki	12 December 1945	
1st Party Congress 6–13 December 1945	Marian Spychalski	12 December 1945	
1st Party Congress 6–13 December 1945	Roman Zambrowski	12 December 1945	
1st Party Congress 6–13 December 1945	Stanisław Radkiewicz	12 December 1945	
1st Party Congress 6–13 December 1945	Franciszek Jóźwiak	3 September 1948	
1st Party Congress 6–13 December 1945	Hilary Chełchowski (A)	3 September 1948	
1st Party Congress 6–13 December 1945	Franciszek Mazur (A)	3 September 1948	
1st Party Congress 6–13 December 1945	Edward Ochab (A)	3 September 1948	

== Politburo of the Polish United Workers Party, 1948–1990 ==
Date	Member	from	to
1st Party Congress 15–22 December 1948	Bolesław Bierut	21 December 1948	
1st Party Congress 15–22 December 1948	Jakub Berman	21 December 1948	
1st Party Congress 15–22 December 1948	Hilary Minc	21 December 1948	
1st Party Congress 15–22 December 1948	Aleksander Zawadzki	21 December 1948	
1st Party Congress 15–22 December 1948	Marian Spychalski	21 December 1948	13 November 1949
1st Party Congress 15–22 December 1948	Roman Zambrowski	21 December 1948	
1st Party Congress 15–22 December 1948	Franciszek Jóźwiak	21 December 1948	
1st Party Congress 15–22 December 1948	Józef Cyrankiewicz	21 December 1948	
1st Party Congress 15–22 December 1948	Stanisław Radkiewicz	21 December 1948	
1st Party Congress 15–22 December 1948	Adam Rapacki	21 December 1948	17 March 1954
1st Party Congress 15–22 December 1948	Henryk Świątkowski	21 December 1948	10 May 1950
1st Party Congress 15–22 December 1948	Franciszek Mazur	10 May 1950	
1st Party Congress 15–22 December 1948	Konstantin Rokossovsky	10 May 1950	
1st Party Congress 15–22 December 1948	Hilary Chełchowski (A)	21 December 1948	
1st Party Congress 15–22 December 1948	Franciszek Mazur (A)	21 December 1948	10 May 1950
1st Party Congress 15–22 December 1948	Edward Ochab (A)	21 December 1948	17 March 1954
1st Party Congress 15–22 December 1948	Stefan Matuszewski (A)	21 December 1948	17 March 1954
1st Party Congress 15–22 December 1948	Zenon Nowak (A)	10 May 1950	17 March 1954
1st Party Congress 15–22 December 1948	Władysław Dworakowski (A)	15 May 1952	17 March 1954
2nd Party Congress 10–17 March 1954	Bolesław Bierut	17 March 1954	12 March 1956
2nd Party Congress 10–17 March 1954	Jakub Berman	17 March 1954	4 May 1956
2nd Party Congress 10–17 March 1954	Hilary Minc	17 March 1954	10 October 1956
2nd Party Congress 10–17 March 1954	Aleksander Zawadzki	17 March 1954	
2nd Party Congress 10–17 March 1954	Roman Zambrowski	17 March 1954	
2nd Party Congress 10–17 March 1954	Franciszek Jóźwiak	17 March 1954	21 October 1956
2nd Party Congress 10–17 March 1954	Józef Cyrankiewicz	17 March 1954	
2nd Party Congress 10–17 March 1954	Stanisław Radkiewicz	17 March 1954	19 April 1956
2nd Party Congress 10–17 March 1954	Edward Ochab	17 March 1954	
2nd Party Congress 10–17 March 1954	Konstantin Rokossovsky	17 March 1954	21 October 1956
2nd Party Congress 10–17 March 1954	Zenon Nowak	17 March 1954	21 October 1956
2nd Party Congress 10–17 March 1954	Franciszek Mazur	17 March 1954	21 October 1956
2nd Party Congress 10–17 March 1954	Władysław Dworakowski	17 March 1954	21 October 1956
2nd Party Congress 10–17 March 1954	Adam Rapacki	28 July 1956	
2nd Party Congress 10–17 March 1954	Edward Gierek	28 July 1956	21 October 1956
2nd Party Congress 10–17 March 1954	Roman Nowak	28 July 1956	21 October 1956
2nd Party Congress 10–17 March 1954	Adam Rapacki (A)	17 March 1954	28 July 1956
2nd Party Congress 10–17 March 1954	Hilary Chełchowski (A)	17 March 1954	21 October 1956
Composition from 21 October 1956	Władysław Gomułka	21 October 1956	
Composition from 21 October 1956	Aleksander Zawadzki	21 October 1956	
Composition from 21 October 1956	Roman Zambrowski	21 October 1956	
Composition from 21 October 1956	Józef Cyrankiewicz	21 October 1956	
Composition from 21 October 1956	Edward Ochab	21 October 1956	
Composition from 21 October 1956	Adam Rapacki	21 October 1956	
Composition from 21 October 1956	Stefan Jędrychowski	21 October 1956	
Composition from 21 October 1956	Ignacy Loga-Sowiński	21 October 1956	
Composition from 21 October 1956	Jerzy Morawski	21 October 1956	
3rd Party Congress 10–19 March 1959	Władysław Gomułka	19 March 1959	
3rd Party Congress 10–19 March 1959	Aleksander Zawadzki	19 March 1959	
3rd Party Congress 10–19 March 1959	Roman Zambrowski	19 March 1959	July 1963
3rd Party Congress 10–19 March 1959	Józef Cyrankiewicz	19 March 1959	
3rd Party Congress 10–19 March 1959	Edward Ochab	19 March 1959	
3rd Party Congress 10–19 March 1959	Adam Rapacki	19 March 1959	
3rd Party Congress 10–19 March 1959	Stefan Jędrychowski	19 March 1959	
3rd Party Congress 10–19 March 1959	Ignacy Loga-Sowiński	19 March 1959	
3rd Party Congress 10–19 March 1959	Jerzy Morawski	19 March 1959	October 1959
3rd Party Congress 10–19 March 1959	Edward Gierek	19 March 1959	
3rd Party Congress 10–19 March 1959	Marian Spychalski	19 March 1959	
3rd Party Congress 10–19 March 1959	Zenon Kliszko	19 March 1959	
4th Party Congress 15–20 June 1964	Władysław Gomułka	20 June 1964	
4th Party Congress 15–20 June 1964	Aleksander Zawadzki	20 June 1964	7 August 1964
4th Party Congress 15–20 June 1964	Józef Cyrankiewicz	20 June 1964	
4th Party Congress 15–20 June 1964	Edward Ochab	20 June 1964	9 July 1968
4th Party Congress 15–20 June 1964	Adam Rapacki	20 June 1964	16 November 1968
4th Party Congress 15–20 June 1964	Stefan Jędrychowski	20 June 1964	
4th Party Congress 15–20 June 1964	Ignacy Loga-Sowiński	20 June 1964	
4th Party Congress 15–20 June 1964	Edward Gierek	20 June 1964	
4th Party Congress 15–20 June 1964	Marian Spychalski	20 June 1964	
4th Party Congress 15–20 June 1964	Zenon Kliszko	20 June 1964	
4th Party Congress 15–20 June 1964	Eugeniusz Szyr	20 June 1964	16 November 1968
4th Party Congress 15–20 June 1964	Franciszek Waniołka	20 June 1964	16 November 1968
4th Party Congress 15–20 June 1964	Ryszard Strzelecki	21 November 1964	
4th Party Congress 15–20 June 1964	Bolesław Jaszczuk	9 July 1968	
4th Party Congress 15–20 June 1964	Ryszard Strzelecki (A)	20 June 1964	21 November 1964
4th Party Congress 15–20 June 1964	Piotr Jaroszewicz (A)	20 June 1964	
4th Party Congress 15–20 June 1964	Mieczysław Jagielski (A)	20 June 1964	
4th Party Congress 15–20 June 1964	Bolesław Jaszczuk (A)	1964?	9 July 1968
5th Party Congress 11–16 November 1968	Władysław Gomułka	16 November 1968	20 December 1970
5th Party Congress 11–16 November 1968	Józef Cyrankiewicz	16 November 1968	
5th Party Congress 11–16 November 1968	Stefan Jędrychowski	16 November 1968	
5th Party Congress 11–16 November 1968	Ignacy Loga-Sowiński	16 November 1968	
5th Party Congress 11–16 November 1968	Edward Gierek	16 November 1968	
5th Party Congress 11–16 November 1968	Marian Spychalski	16 November 1968	20 December 1970
5th Party Congress 11–16 November 1968	Zenon Kliszko	16 November 1968	20 December 1970
5th Party Congress 11–16 November 1968	Ryszard Strzelecki	16 November 1968	20 December 1970
5th Party Congress 11–16 November 1968	Bolesław Jaszczuk	16 November 1968	20 December 1970
5th Party Congress 11–16 November 1968	Stanisław Kociołek	16 November 1968	
5th Party Congress 11–16 November 1968	Wladysław Kruczek	16 November 1968	
5th Party Congress 11–16 November 1968	Józef Tejchma	16 November 1968	
5th Party Congress 11–16 November 1968	Piotr Jaroszewicz (A)	16 November 1968	20 December 1970
5th Party Congress 11–16 November 1968	Mieczysław Jagielski (A)	16 November 1968	
5th Party Congress 11–16 November 1968	Mieczysław Moczar (A)	16 November 1968	20 December 1970
5th Party Congress 11–16 November 1968	Jan Szydlak (A)	16 November 1968	20 December 1970
Composition from 20 December 1970	Edward Gierek	20 December 1970	
Composition from 20 December 1970	Józef Cyrankiewicz	20 December 1970	11 December 1971
Composition from 20 December 1970	Stefan Jędrychowski	20 December 1970	11 December 1971
Composition from 20 December 1970	Ignacy Loga-Sowiński	20 December 1970	7 February 1971
Composition from 20 December 1970	Stanisław Kociołek	20 December 1970	7 February 1971
Composition from 20 December 1970	Władysław Kruczek	20 December 1970	
Composition from 20 December 1970	Józef Tejchma	20 December 1970	
Composition from 20 December 1970	Piotr Jaroszewicz	20 December 1970	
Composition from 20 December 1970	Mieczysław Moczar	20 December 1970	11 December 1971
Composition from 20 December 1970	Jan Szydlak	20 December 1970	
Composition from 20 December 1970	Edward Babiuch	20 December 1970	
Composition from 20 December 1970	Stefan Olszowski	20 December 1970	
Composition from 20 December 1970	Mieczysław Jagielski (A)	20 December 1970	11 December 1971
Composition from 20 December 1970	Wojciech Jaruzelski (A)	20 December 1970	11 December 1971
Composition from 20 December 1970	Henryk Jabłoński (A)	20 December 1970	11 December 1971
Composition from 20 December 1970	Józef Kępa (A)	20 December 1970	
6th Party Congress 6–11 December 1971	Edward Gierek	11 December 1971	
6th Party Congress 6–11 December 1971	Władysław Kruczek	11 December 1971	
6th Party Congress 6–11 December 1971	Józef Tejchma	11 December 1971	
6th Party Congress 6–11 December 1971	Piotr Jaroszewicz	11 December 1971	
6th Party Congress 6–11 December 1971	Jan Szydlak	11 December 1971	
6th Party Congress 6–11 December 1971	Edward Babiuch	11 December 1971	
6th Party Congress 6–11 December 1971	Stefan Olszowski	11 December 1971	
6th Party Congress 6–11 December 1971	Mieczysław Jagielski	11 December 1971	
6th Party Congress 6–11 December 1971	Wojciech Jaruzelski	11 December 1971	
6th Party Congress 6–11 December 1971	Henryk Jabłoński	11 December 1971	
6th Party Congress 6–11 December 1971	Franciszek Szlachcic	11 December 1971	12 December 1975
6th Party Congress 6–11 December 1971	Józef Kępa (A)	11 December 1971	12 December 1975
6th Party Congress 6–11 December 1971	Stanisław Kania (A)	11 December 1971	12 December 1975
6th Party Congress 6–11 December 1971	Zdzisław Grudzień (A)	11 December 1971	12 December 1975
6th Party Congress 6–11 December 1971	Kazimierz Barcikowski (A)	11 December 1971	
6th Party Congress 6–11 December 1971	Stanisław Kowalczyk (A)	April 1973	12 December 1975
7th Party Congress 8–12 December 1975	Edward Gierek	12 December 1975	
7th Party Congress 8–12 December 1975	Wladysław Kruczek	12 December 1975	
7th Party Congress 8–12 December 1975	Józef Tejchma	12 December 1975	15 February 1980
7th Party Congress 8–12 December 1975	Piotr Jaroszewicz	12 December 1975	15 February 1980
7th Party Congress 8–12 December 1975	Jan Szydlak	12 December 1975	
7th Party Congress 8–12 December 1975	Edward Babiuch	12 December 1975	
7th Party Congress 8–12 December 1975	Stefan Olszowski	12 December 1975	15 February 1980
7th Party Congress 8–12 December 1975	Mieczysław Jagielski	12 December 1975	
7th Party Congress 8–12 December 1975	Wojciech Jaruzelski	12 December 1975	
7th Party Congress 8–12 December 1975	Henryk Jabłoński	12 December 1975	
7th Party Congress 8–12 December 1975	Józef Kępa	12 December 1975	15 February 1980
7th Party Congress 8–12 December 1975	Stanisław Kania	12 December 1975	
7th Party Congress 8–12 December 1975	Zdzisław Grudzień	12 December 1975	
7th Party Congress 8–12 December 1975	Stanisław Kowalczyk	12 December 1975	
7th Party Congress 8–12 December 1975	Kazimierz Barcikowski (A)	12 December 1975	
7th Party Congress 8–12 December 1975	Tadeusz Wrzaszczyk (A)	12 December 1975	
7th Party Congress 8–12 December 1975	Jerzy Łukaszewicz (A)	12 December 1975	
8th Party Congress 11–15 February 1980	Edward Gierek	15 February 1980	6 September 1980
8th Party Congress 11–15 February 1980	Władysław Kruczek	15 February 1980	2 December 1980
8th Party Congress 11–15 February 1980	Jan Szydlak	15 February 1980	24 August 1980
8th Party Congress 11–15 February 1980	Edward Babiuch	15 February 1980	24 August 1980
8th Party Congress 11–15 February 1980	Mieczysław Jagielski	15 February 1980	19 July 1981
8th Party Congress 11–15 February 1980	Wojciech Jaruzelski	15 February 1980	
8th Party Congress 11–15 February 1980	Henryk Jabłoński	15 February 1980	19 July 1981
8th Party Congress 11–15 February 1980	Stanisław Kania	15 February 1980	
8th Party Congress 11–15 February 1980	Zdzisław Grudzień	15 February 1980	6 October 1980
8th Party Congress 11–15 February 1980	Stanisław Kowalczyk	15 February 1980	2 December 1980
8th Party Congress 11–15 February 1980	Tadeusz Wrzaszczyk	15 February 1980	24 August 1980
8th Party Congress 11–15 February 1980	Jerzy Łukaszewicz	15 February 1980	24 August 1980
8th Party Congress 11–15 February 1980	Aloizy Karkoszka	15 February 1980	19 November 1980
8th Party Congress 11–15 February 1980	Andrzej Werblan	15 February 1980	2 December 1980
8th Party Congress 11–15 February 1980	Stefan Olszowski	24 August 1980	
8th Party Congress 11–15 February 1980	Józef Pińkowski	24 August 1980	30, April 1981
8th Party Congress 11–15 February 1980	Kazimierz Barcikowski	6 September 1980	
8th Party Congress 11–15 February 1980	Andrzej Żabiński	6 September 1980	19 July 1981
8th Party Congress 11–15 February 1980	Mieczysław Moczar	2 December 1980	19 July 1981
8th Party Congress 11–15 February 1980	Tadeusz Grabski	2 December 1980	19 July 1981
8th Party Congress 11–15 February 1980	Gerard Gabryś	30 April 1981	19 July 1981
8th Party Congress 11–15 February 1980	Zygmunt Wroński	30 April 1981	19 July 1981
8th Party Congress 11–15 February 1980	Kazimierz Barcikowski (A)	15 February 1980	6 September 1980
8th Party Congress 11–15 February 1980	Józef Pińkowski (A)	15 February 1980	24 August 1980
8th Party Congress 11–15 February 1980	Zdzislaw Żandarowski (A)	15 February 1980	24 August 1980
8th Party Congress 11–15 February 1980	Tadeusz Pyka (A)	15 February 1980	24 August 1980
8th Party Congress 11–15 February 1980	Emil Wojtaszek (A)	15 February 1980	30, April 1981
8th Party Congress 11–15 February 1980	Andrzej Żabiński (A)	24 August 1980	6 September 1980
8th Party Congress 11–15 February 1980	Jerzy Waszczuk (A)	24 August 1980	19 July 1981
8th Party Congress 11–15 February 1980	Władysław Kruk (A)	6 October 1980	19 July 1981
8th Party Congress 11–15 February 1980	Roman Ney (A)	6 October 1980	19 July 1981
8th Party Congress 11–15 February 1980	Tadeusz Fiszbach (A)	2 December 1980	19 July 1981
8th Party Congress 11–15 February 1980	Józef Masny (A)	30 April 1981	19 July 1981
9th Party Congress 14–20 July 1981	Stanisław Kania	19 July 1981	Oct 1981
9th Party Congress 14–20 July 1981	Wojciech Jaruzelski	19 July 1981	
9th Party Congress 14–20 July 1981	Stefan Olszowski	19 July 1981	11 November 1985
9th Party Congress 14–20 July 1981	Kazimierz Barcikowski	19 July 1981	
9th Party Congress 14–20 July 1981	Zbigniew Messner	19 July 1981	
9th Party Congress 14–20 July 1981	Tadeusz Czechowicz	19 July 1981	3 July 1986
9th Party Congress 14–20 July 1981	Józef Czyrek	19 July 1981	
9th Party Congress 14–20 July 1981	Zofia Grzyb	19 July 1981	3 July 1986
9th Party Congress 14–20 July 1981	Hieronim Kubiak	19 July 1981	3 July 1986
9th Party Congress 14–20 July 1981	Jan Labecki	19 July 1981	16 July 1982
9th Party Congress 14–20 July 1981	Mirosław Milewski	19 July 1981	14 May 1985
9th Party Congress 14–20 July 1981	Stanisław Opałko	19 July 1981	3 July 1986
9th Party Congress 14–20 July 1981	Tadeusz Porębski	19 July 1981	
9th Party Congress 14–20 July 1981	Jerzy Romanik	19 July 1981	3 July 1986
9th Party Congress 14–20 July 1981	Albin Siwak	19 July 1981	3 July 1986
9th Party Congress 14–20 July 1981	Marian Woźniak	16 July 1982	
9th Party Congress 14–20 July 1981	Stanisław Kalkus	16 July 1982	3 July 1986
9th Party Congress 14–20 July 1981	Jan Głowczyk (A)	19 July 1981	3 July 1986
9th Party Congress 14–20 July 1981	Włodzimierz Mokrzyszczak (A)	19 July 1981	3 July 1986
9th Party Congress 14–20 July 1981	Florian Siwicki (A)	28 October 1981	3 July 1986
9th Party Congress 14–20 July 1981	Marian Woźniak (A)	25 February 1982	16 July 1982
9th Party Congress 14–20 July 1981	Czesław Kiszczak (A)	25 February 1982	3 July 1986
9th Party Congress 14–20 July 1981	Stanisław Bejger (A)	16 July 1982	
9th Party Congress 14–20 July 1981	Marian Orzechowski (A)	15 October 1983	3 July 1986
10th Party Congress 29 – 3 July 1986	Wojciech Jaruzelski	3 July 1986	29 July 1989
10th Party Congress 29 – 3 July 1986	Kazimierz Barcikowski	3 July 1986	29 July 1989
10th Party Congress 29 – 3 July 1986	Zbigniew Messner	3 July 1986	21 December 1988
10th Party Congress 29 – 3 July 1986	Józef Czyrek	3 July 1986	29 July 1989
10th Party Congress 29 – 3 July 1986	Tadeusz Porebski	3 July 1986	21 December 1988
10th Party Congress 29 – 3 July 1986	Marian Woźniak	3 July 1986	14 July 1988
10th Party Congress 29 – 3 July 1986	Jan Głowczyk	3 July 1986	21 December 1988
10th Party Congress 29 – 3 July 1986	Włodzimierz Mokrzyszczak	3 July 1986	14 July 1988
10th Party Congress 29 – 3 July 1986	Florian Siwicki	3 July 1986	
10th Party Congress 29 – 3 July 1986	Czesław Kiszczak	3 July 1986	
10th Party Congress 29 – 3 July 1986	Marian Orzechowski	3 July 1986	
10th Party Congress 29 – 3 July 1986	Józef Baryła	3 July 1986	21 December 1988
10th Party Congress 29 – 3 July 1986	Zofia Stepień	3 July 1986	21 December 1988
10th Party Congress 29 – 3 July 1986	Zygmunt Murański	3 July 1986	21 December 1988
10th Party Congress 29 – 3 July 1986	Alfred Miodowicz	3 July 1986	29 July 1989
10th Party Congress 29 – 3 July 1986	Mieczysław Rakowski	15 December 1987	
10th Party Congress 29 – 3 July 1986	Władysław Baka	14 July 1988	
10th Party Congress 29 – 3 July 1986	Kazimierz Cypryniak	21 December 1988	
10th Party Congress 29 – 3 July 1986	Iwona Lubowska	21 December 1988	
10th Party Congress 29 – 3 July 1986	Wiktor Pyrkosz	21 December 1988	
10th Party Congress 29 – 3 July 1986	Janusz Reykowski	21 December 1988	
10th Party Congress 29 – 3 July 1986	Zdzisław Świątek	21 December 1988	
10th Party Congress 29 – 3 July 1986	Stanisław Ciosek	21 December 1988	29 July 1989
10th Party Congress 29 – 3 July 1986	Zbigniew Michalek	21 December 1988	
10th Party Congress 29 – 3 July 1986	Gabriela Rembisz	21 December 1988	
10th Party Congress 29 – 3 July 1986	Stanisław Bejger (A)	3 July 1986	14 July 1988
10th Party Congress 29 – 3 July 1986	Bogumił Ferensztajn (A)	3 July 1986	15 December 1987
10th Party Congress 29 – 3 July 1986	Zbigniew Michałek (A)	3 July 1986	21 December 1988
10th Party Congress 29 – 3 July 1986	Gabriela Rembisz (A)	3 July 1986	21 December 1988
10th Party Congress 29 – 3 July 1986	Janusz Kubasiewicz (A)	3 July 1986	29 July 1989
10th Party Congress 29 – 3 July 1986	Manfred Gorywoda (A)	15 December 1987	29 July 1989
10th Party Congress 29 – 3 July 1986	Stanisław Ciosek (A)	14 July 1988	21 December 1988
10th Party Congress 29 – 3 July 1986	Zdzisław Balicki (A)	21 December 1988	
10th Party Congress 29 – 3 July 1986	Marek Holdakowski (A)	21 December 1988	
10th Party Congress 29 – 3 July 1986	Zbigniew Sobotka (A)	21 December 1988	
Composition from 29 July 1989	Mieczysław Rakowski	29 July 1989	29 January 1990
Composition from 29 July 1989	Florian Siwicki	29 July 1989	29 January 1990
Composition from 29 July 1989	Czesław Kiszczak	29 July 1989	29 January 1990
Composition from 29 July 1989	Marian Orzechowski	29 July 1989	29 January 1990
Composition from 29 July 1989	Władyslaw Baka	29 July 1989	29 January 1990
Composition from 29 July 1989	Kazimierz Cypryniak	29 July 1989	29 January 1990
Composition from 29 July 1989	Iwona Lubowska	29 July 1989	29 January 1990
Composition from 29 July 1989	Wiktor Pyrkosz	29 July 1989	29 January 1990
Composition from 29 July 1989	Janusz Reykowski	29 July 1989	29 January 1990
Composition from 29 July 1989	Zdzislaw Świątek	29 July 1989	29 January 1990
Composition from 29 July 1989	Zbigniew Michałek	29 July 1989	29 January 1990
Composition from 29 July 1989	Gabriela Rembisz	29 July 1989	29 January 1990
Composition from 29 July 1989	Janusz Kubasiewicz	29 July 1989	29 January 1990
Composition from 29 July 1989	Manfred Gorywoda	29 July 1989	29 January 1990
Composition from 29 July 1989	Leszek Miller	29 July 1989	29 January 1990
Composition from 29 July 1989	Zdzisław Balicki (A)	29 July 1989	29 January 1990
Composition from 29 July 1989	Marek Hołdakowski (A)	29 July 1989	29 January 1990
Composition from 29 July 1989	Zbigniew Sobotka (A)	29 July 1989	29 January 1990

(A) = Alternate (Candidate) Member
