= Ignacy Loga-Sowiński =

Polish trade union activist and politician

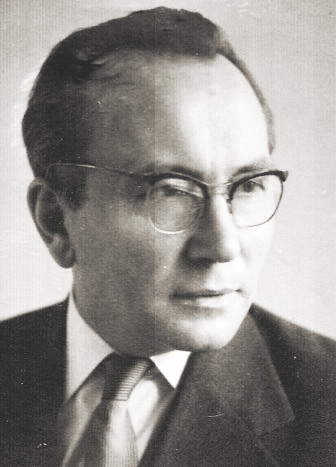

Deputy Chairman of the State Council
- In office June 24, 1965 – February 13, 1971

Member of the Polish State Council
- In office February 20, 1957 – February 13, 1971

Personal details
- Born: 20 January 1914 Varnkewitz
- Died: 10 December 1992 (aged 78) Warsaw
- Party: Polish United Workers' Party
- Awards: Medal im. Ludwika Waryńskiego

Ignacy Loga-Sowiński (January 20, 1914 – December 10, 1992) was a Polish trade union activist and politician. He was a member of the Central Committee and Politburo of the Polish United Workers' Party. He was a member of the State National Council from 1956 to 1971. He also served as the deputy chairman of the council and was an ambassador of the Polish People's Republic to Turkey from 1971 to 1978.

== Early life ==
He is the son of Władysław and Honorata née Misiak, his father being an agricultural laborer. He received elementary education. Ignacy's profession was a bricklayer in the pre-war period, he lived in Łódź during that time. He was involved in the Communist Youth Association (KZMP) and joined the Communist Party of Poland in 1935. In February 1938, he was arrested during a search that revealed a manuscript of communist appearance. During the years 1938–1939, he was imprisoned for political reasons. During the 1939 Invasion of Poland, he was released from prison.

== Career ==
=== 1940s ===
During the occupation of Poland, he was active in the underground resistance. He was together with Mieczysław Moczar a co-founder of the organization Front Fighting for Our and Your Freedom, which after the uprising of Polish Workers Party transforms into its cells. Afterward, he worked in the apparatus of the Central Committee of the Polish Workers' Party. He then became a Representative of the Central Committee of the PPR for the Lublin region from June to July 1944.

Starting from January 1945, he was a representative of the Provisional Government for Łódź Voivodeship. Following that month, he became First Secretary of the Provincial Committee of the Polish Workers Party in Łódź, and from 1946 he was a part of the Łódź Committee of the Polish Workers Party. In 1943, he served as a deputy member of the Central Committee of the PPR and in that same year, a member of the Central Committee of the PPR. He served these last two positions to the year, 1948. In the year 1944, he was made a member of the Krajowej Narodowej and in 1947, made a part of the Sejm Ustawodawczy of Poland.

From 1949, he was associated with trade unions: he was the chairman of the District Trade Union Commission and the Provincial Council of Trade Unions in Wrocław. He was also the secretary of the Association of Trade Unions, serving all of these roles until 1956.

=== 1950s ===
In 1956, he became chairman of the Central Council of Trade Union. The following year, he was elected to the State Council of Poland in 1957. Whilst he was a member. In the year 1958, he was the deputy chairman of the National Committee National Unity Front and would serve that role until 1971.

=== 1960s ===
He was elected to the position of Deputy Chairman of the State Council of Poland in 1965. In June 1968 he became a member of the Honorary Committee of the 500th anniversary of the birth of Mikołaj Kopernik.

=== 1970s ===
Loga-Sowiński joined the workers' uprising from December 14 to 22, 1970. During this time he was acting chairman of the central council of the trade union federation CRZZ, after which he was replaced by Władysław Kruczek. In the year 1971, he was made an ambassador of the People's Republic of Poland to Turkey until the year 1978.

== Death ==
He died in 1992 due to natural causes. He was buried next to his mother, Honorata, in Powązki Military Cemetery in Warsaw.

== Awards ==
- Order of the Builders of People's Poland
- Order of the Banner of Labour
- Gold Cross of Merit (Poland)
- Order of the Cross of Grunwald
- Medal of the 10th Anniversary of People's Poland
- Medal of Ludwik Waryński
- Badge "For Merits for Zbowid"

== Bibliography ==
- Leksykon Historii Polski, Wydawnictwo Wiedza Powszechna, Warszawa 1995
- A. Mazur, Order Krzyża Grunwaldu, Bellona Publishing House, Warszawa 1988
- S. Kisielewski, Abecadło Kisiela, Oficyna Wydawnicza, Warszawa 1990
- T. Mołdawa, Ludzie władzy 1944–1991, Wydawnictwo Naukowe PWN, Warszawa 1991
- B. Syzdek, Władysław Gomułka we wspomnieniach, Wydawnictwo Lubelskie, Lublin 1989
- A. Werblan, Władysław Gomułka, sekretarz generalny PPR, Książka i Wiedza, Warszawa 1988
- VI Kongres ZBoWiD Warszawa 7–8 maja 1979, Wydawnictwo ZG ZBoWiD, Warszawa 1979
- VII Kongres ZBoWiD, Wydawnictwo ZG ZBoWiD, Warszawa 1985
- Za Wolność i Lud", nr 15 (1060) on April 14, 1984, s. 1
