= Kazimierz Barcikowski =

Polish politician

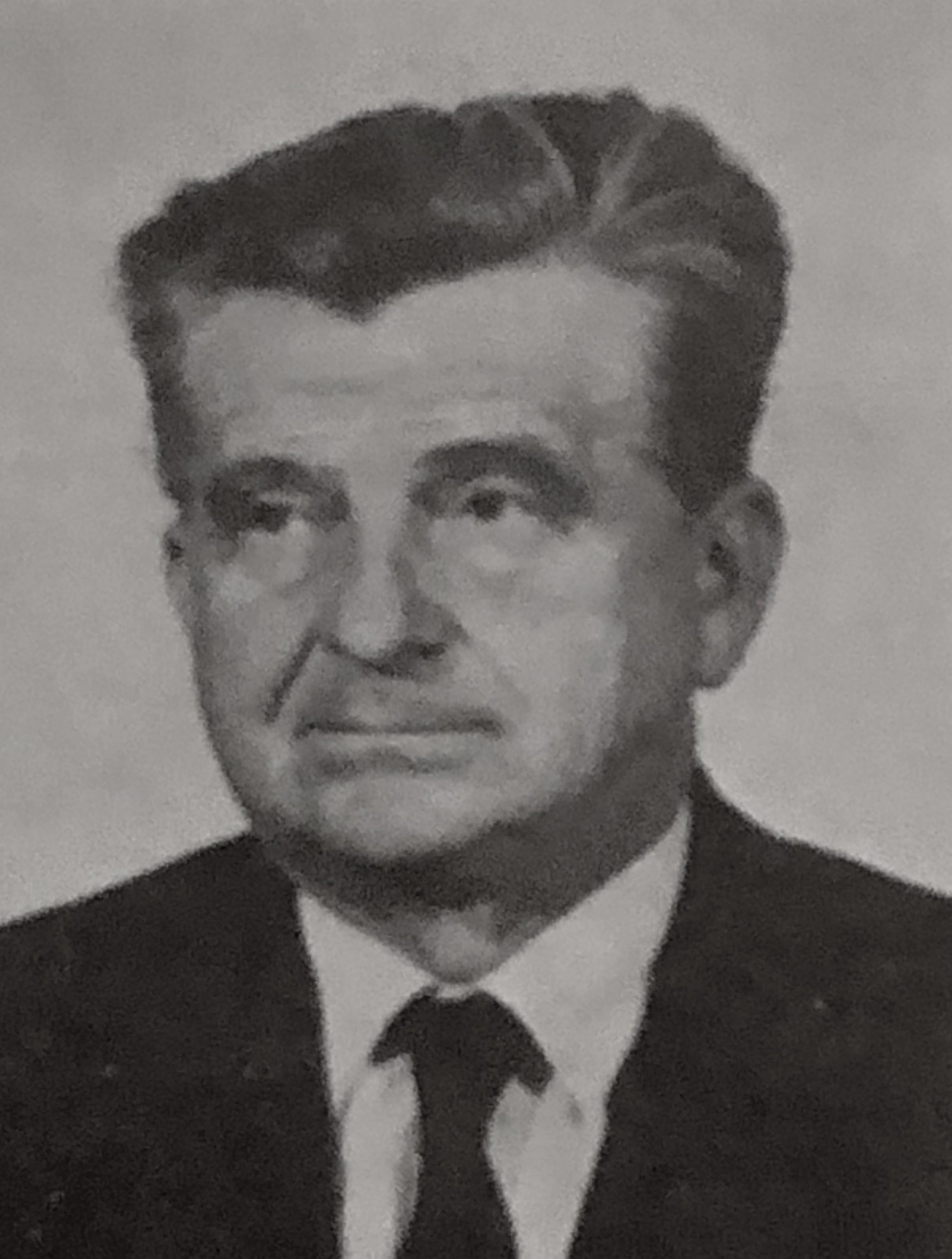
- Barcikowski in 1986

Member of the State Council
- In office 8 October 1980 – 19 July 1989

Deputy Chairman of the State Council
- In office 6 November 1985 – 19 July 1989

Deputy Prime Minister
- In office 18 February 1980 – 18 October 1980

Minister of Agriculture
- In office 16 February 1974 – 17 December 1977
- Preceded by: Józef Okuniewski
- Succeeded by: Leon Kłonica

Personal details
- Born: 22 March 1927 Zglechów, Masovian Voivodeship, Poland
- Died: 10 July 2007 (aged 80) Warsaw, Poland
- Party: Polish United Workers' Party
- Occupation: Politician
- Awards

Kazimierz Barcikowski (Polish pronunciation: [kaˈʑimjɛʐ bart͡ɕiˈkɔfskʲi]; 22 March 1927 – 10 July 2007) was a Polish politician. As a member of Polish United Workers' Party (PZPR), he served on the Central Committee and on the Politburo of the PZPR. Among his other posts were those of deputy to Sejm and minister of agriculture. Barcikowski served as head of government negotiations with striking workers in Szczecin in 1980 and was one of four deputy chairmen of the Polish Council of State from 1985 to 1989.

== Biography ==
Son of Jan and Stefania. During World War II he fought in the Home Army. In 1949 he graduated from the Higher School of Rural Economy in Łódź, in 1966 he obtained a doctorate in economics at the Higher School of Social Sciences at the Central Committee of the Polish United Workers' Party.

In 1946 he joined the Union of Rural Youth of the Republic of Poland Wici, and later the Union of Polish Youth. He was the organizational manager of the provincial board of Wici (1947–1948) and ZMP (1948–1949) in Łódź. He served as vice-chairman of the Provincial Board of ZMP in Bydgoszcz, and then until 1957 as secretary and vice-chairman of the main board of ZMP. From 1957 to 1960 he was vice-chairman of the main board of the Union of Rural Youth, and in the years 1963–1965 chairman.

He was a member of the People's Party and the United People's Party. Since 1954 member of the Polish United Workers' Party. In the years 1954-1956 he was deputy editor-in-chief of the State Publishing House "Iskry". He completed doctoral studies at the Higher School of Social Sciences at the Central Committee of the Polish United Workers' Party. In the years 1965-1968 deputy head of the Organizational Department of the Central Committee, at the same time editor-in-chief of the magazine "Życie Parti". In the years 1964-1968 deputy member of the Central Committee of the Polish United Workers' Party, in the years 1968-1990 member of the Central Committee, in the years 1971-1980 deputy member of the Political Bureau of the Central Committee, and in the years 1980-1989 member of the Political Bureau. From 1968 to 1970 he was the First Secretary of the Provincial Committee in Poznań, in the years 1970–1974 and 1980–1985 the Secretary of the Central Committee, and in the years 1977–1980 the First Secretary of the Kraków Committee and the Chairman of the Presidium of the Provincial National Council.

In the years 1974–1977 he was the Minister of Agriculture, and in 1980 he took the office of the Deputy Chairman of the Council of Ministers. In the period 1980–1985 he was a member, and in 1985–1989 he was the Deputy Chairman of the Council of State. He held a mandate as a Member of Parliament in the Sejm of the Polish People's Republic of the 4th, 5th, 6th, 7th, 8th and 9th term (1965–1989), in the years 1980–1985 he was the Chairman of the PZPR Deputies' Club in the Sejm of the 8th term. In 1980 he became the representative of Poland in the Executive Committee of the Council for Mutual Economic Assistance, in the same year he also became co-chairman of the Joint Commission of the Government and the Episcopate.

He chaired the government commission conducting negotiations with the Inter-Enterprise Strike Committee in Szczecin in August 1980. He signed the agreement between the government and the Inter-Enterprise Strike Committee, whose chairman in Szczecin was Marian Jurczyk. It contained consent to the establishment of independent trade unions. In the years 1981-1983 he was a member of the Commission of the Central Committee of the Polish United Workers' Party, established to explain the causes and course of social conflicts in the history of the People's Republic of Poland[3]. On September 2, 1982, by decision of the Political Bureau of the Central Committee of the Polish United Workers' Party, he joined the Honorary Committee of the funeral ceremony of Władysław Gomułka.

Buried at the Powązki Military Cemetery in Warsaw.

== Awards and decorations ==
- Polish:
  - Order of the Builders of People's Poland (1977)
  - Order of the Banner of Labour, 1st Class
  - Order of the Banner of Labour, 2nd Class
  - Officer's Cross of the Order of Polonia Restituta (1964)
  - Gold Cross of Merit (1955)
  - Medal of the 30th Anniversary of People's Poland (1974)
  - Medal of the 40th Anniversary of People's Poland (1984)
  - Medal of the 10th Anniversary of People's Poland (1955)
  - Gold Medal of Merit for National Defence
  - Silver Medal of Merit for National Defence
  - Bronze Medal of Merit for National Defence
  - Badge of the 1000th Anniversary of the Polish State (1966)
- Foreign:
  - Order of Friendship of Peoples (USSR, 1987)
  - Jubilee Medal "Thirty Years of Victory in the Great Patriotic War 1941–1945" (USSR, 1975)
  - Jubilee Medal "Forty Years of Victory in the Great Patriotic War 1941–1945" (USSR, 1985)
  - 90th Anniversary of the Birth of Georgi Dimitrov Medal (Bulgaria)
  - 100th Anniversary of the Birth of Georgi Dimitrov Medal (Bulgaria)
  - Gold Star of Peoples' Friendship (East Germany, 1986)
