= Association of Trade Unions =

Symbol used by the Association of Trade Unions

The Association of Trade Unions (Polish: Zrzeszenie Związków Zawodowych, ZZZ) was a nominal national trade union federation in Poland, led by the Central Trade Union Council (Polish: Centralna Rada Związków Zawodowych, CRZZ).

The federation was founded in 1945. It claimed 4,000,000 members by 1956, and 12,000,000 in 1980. It was closely linked with the Polish United Workers' Party, although temporarily achieved some autonomy in 1956 during the short period of liberalisation.

In 1980, Solidarity was established as an independent trade union. It proved highly popular; the ZZZ lost most of its membership, and was dissolved in December. Its assets were later passed to the new All-Poland Alliance of Trade Unions.

== Affiliates ==
In 1956, the following unions were affiliates:

- Agricultural and Forestry Workers' Trade Union
- Chemical Industry Workers' Trade Union
- Communal Economy Employees' Trade Union
- Communication Workers' Trade Union
- Construction, Ceramics and Allied Trade Workers' Union
- Cultural Workers' Trade Union
- Electrical Power Workers' Trade Union
- Food Industry Workers' Trade Union
- Foundry Industry Workers' Trade Union
- Health Service Workers' Trade Union
- Metal Workers' Trade Union
- Miners' Trade Union
- Railway Workers' Trade Union
- Road and Air Transport Workers' Trade Union
- Shipping Workers' Trade Union
- State and Public Workers' Trade Union
- Textile, Clothing and Leather Industry Workers' Trade Union
- Wood Products and Local Industry Workers' Trade Union
- Trade Workers' Trade Union

== Presidents ==
1945: Kazimierz Witaszewski
1948: Edward Ochab
1949: Aleksander Zawadzki
1950: Wiktor Kłosiewicz
1956: Ignacy Loga-Sowiński
1971: Władysław Kruczek
1980: Jan Szydlak
1980: Romuald Jankowski
