= Matuszewski =

Matuszewski (feminine: Matuszewska; plural: Matuszewscy) is a Polish surname. It may refer to:

- Bolesław Matuszewski (1856–c. 1943), Polish photographer
- Ignacy Matuszewski (1891–1946), Polish politician
- Konrad Matuszewski (born 2001), Polish footballer
- Krzysztof Matuszewski (born 1953), Polish footballer
- Marek Matuszewski (born 1959), Polish politician
- Piotr Matuszewski (born 1998), Polish tennis player
- Richard Matuszewski (born 1964), American tennis player
- Stefan Matuszewski (1905–1985), Polish educator and politician
