= Dziennik Polska-Europa-Świat =

Polish daily newspaper (2006–2009)

Dziennik Polska-Europa-Świat (Daily Poland-Europe-World)
- A cover from September 2006
- Type: Daily newspaper
- Format: Compact (Tabloid)
- Owner(s): Axel Springer AG; Ringier
- Editor: Robert Krasowski
- Founded: 2006
- Ceased publication: 2009
- Political alignment: Conservative liberal
- Language: Polish
- Headquarters: Warsaw
- Circulation: 160,000

Dziennik Polska-Europa-Świat (Polish pronunciation: [ˈd͡ʑɛn.ɲik ˈpɔl.ska ɛwˈrɔ.pa ˈɕfjat]; English: Daily Poland-Europe-World) was a Polish nationwide daily newspaper published by Ringier Axel Springer, a joint venture between Germany's Axel Springer Verlag publishing company and Swiss media company Ringier.

== History ==
Dziennik Polska-Europa-Świat was modelled on Springer's Welt Kompakt, the Berliner-style edition of the Hamburg-published broadsheet Die Welt. The first issue was released on 18 April 2006, and in May 2006 it recorded a circulation of 211,610 copies, giving it the third largest circulation amongst national newspapers. Dziennik was envisaged as a competitor to Gazeta Wyborcza, therefore its political profile was more right-wing than its left-liberal rival. In most cases, however, it presented a broad spectrum of views on its pages.

On 14 September 2009 "Dziennik" was merged with Infor Bizness's "Gazeta Prawna" daily to form a new nationwide daily under the title "Dziennik Gazeta Prawna".

=== Columnists ===
- Jerzy Pilch
- Maciej Rybiński
- Jan Rokita
- Albin Siwak

== See also ==
- Official Website
