= Franciszek Mazur =

Polish lawyer of Ukrainian descent and communist politician

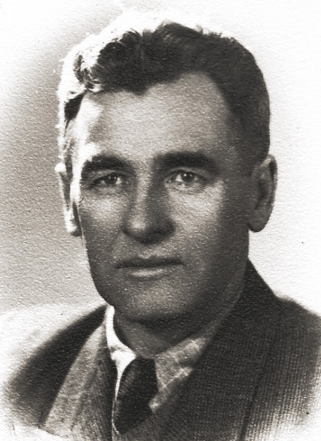
- Franciszek Mazur before 1938

Vice chairman of the Polish State Council
- In office 20 November 1952 – 20 February 1957

Deputy Speaker of the Sejm
- In office 20 November 1952 – 20 November 1956

Ambassador of the Polish People's Republic to Czechoslovakia
- In office 1957–1965
- Preceded by: Adam Cuber
- Succeeded by: Włodzimierz Janiurek

Personal details
- Born: Lewko Horodenko; 1 August 1895 Wowokiwci, Congress Poland (today Ukraine)
- Died: 7 March 1975 (aged 79) Warsaw, Poland
- Resting place: Powązki Military Cemetery
- Party: Polish United Workers' Party

Franciszek Andrzej Mazur (born Lewko Horodenko), also known as Stanisław Gajsler (August 1, 1895 – March 7, 1975) was a Polish lawyer of Ukrainian descent, a communist politician. President of the Supreme Court of the USSR (1926–1928), member of the Central Committee of the Communist Party of Poland (1930–1938). After 1945 he joined the Polish Workers' Party, then deputy member and member of the Politburo of the Central Committee of the Polish United Workers' Party (1948-1956). Member of the State National Council, the Sejm of the People's Republic of Poland of the 1st term, in the years 1952-1957 deputy chairman of the State Council, deputy marshal of the Sejm of the 1st convocation.

== Biography ==
The son of a farm worker. He came from a Ukrainian-speaking Catholic family. In 1915 he was mobilized for military service in the Black Sea Fleet of the Imperial Russian Navy. After the February Revolution and the overthrow of the tsar, while serving in the navy in Sevastopol in 1917, he joined the Polish Socialist Party - Left and collaborated with the Bolsheviks. After the October Revolution he took part in the Russian Civil War, in June 1919 he joined the Russian Communist Party (Bolsheviks), as a soldier of the Red Army he took part in the Polish–Soviet War in Ukraine.

After graduating from law studies, he held positions in the state apparatus of the USSR. From March 1923 to the end of 1925 he was the chairman of the Governor's Court of the Kiev Governorate, then from November 1925 a judge of the Supreme Court of the USSR, and from April 1926 to August 1928 the President of the Supreme Court of the USSR in Kharkov. Then, in the years 1928–1930, he was the head of the department of higher and vocational schools in the People's Commissariat of Education of the Ukrainian SSR (1928-1930), and finally the first secretary of the Regional Committee of the WKP(b) Shepetówka-Berdyczów (1930).

In 1930, by the decision of the Comintern, he was sent to underground party work in Poland. He was included in the Central Committee of the Communist Party of Poland (1930–1938), and at the same time he was the head of the Secretariat of the Communist Party of Western Ukraine. At the same time, from June 15, 1930, to January 18, 1934, he was formally a deputy member of the Central Committee of the Communist Party (Bolsheviks) of Ukraine. Arrested by the State Police, he was sentenced to six years in prison, of which he served approximately five. He served his sentence in prisons in Lviv, Rawicz, Wronki and Koronowo, then emigrated to Czechoslovakia and France. After the outbreak of World War II, he moved to the USSR.

In June 1940 he was arrested by the NKVD, imprisoned in Lubyanka and tortured. On March 15, 1941, he was sentenced to five years in a labor camp for anti-Soviet propaganda - in conversations in the prison commune in Koronowo in 1937, he was supposed to negate the counter-revolutionary nature of Trotskyism and support the Trotskyists during his activities in the 1920s in Ukraine. He was released from the concentration camp in 1945 at the personal intervention of Bolesław Bierut.

=== Communist Poland ===
In mid-1945 he came to Poland, a member of the Polish Workers' Party, a member of the Central Committee and the Secretariat of the Central Committee of the Polish Workers' Party; in 1948 he became a deputy member of the Politburo of the Central Committee of the Polish Workers' Party and a member of the Organizational Bureau of the Central Committee of the Polish Workers' Party. He was also permanently associated with the Polish Workers' Party as the head of the Organizational Department of the Central Committee of the Polish Workers' Party in the years 1946–1948.

From December 1948, a member of the Polish United Workers' Party; promoted to full member of the Politburo; until 1956). In the years 1950-1954 a member of the Secretariat of the Organizational Bureau of the Central Committee, in the years 1950-1956 secretary of the Central Committee. Considered an influential figure among the Natolin faction during factional fights in the leadership of the Polish United Workers' Party in the 1950s. In the years 1959–1964, he was a member of the Central Audit Committee of the Polish United Workers' Party.

In 1946–1956, he was a member of the National Council of Poland, the Legislative Sejm and the Sejm of the People's Republic of Poland of the first term; in 1948 (from October to December) chairman of the Polish Workers' Party Club of Deputies. In the Sejm of the first term, he was Deputy Speaker of the Sejm and in the years 1952–1957 Deputy Chairman of the Council of State, the body that replaced the presidency. In the years 1957–1965, the ambassador of the People's Republic of Poland in Czechoslovakia. He retired in 1965.

He was buried on March 11, 1975, with honors in the Aleja Zasłużonych at the Powązki Military Cemetery in Warsaw. The funeral was attended by representatives of the leadership of the Polish United Workers' Party, including Stanisław Kania, deputy member of the Politburo of the Central Committee of the Polish United Workers' Party, Zygmunt Stępień, head of the Personnel Department of the Central Committee of the Polish United Workers' Party, Henryk Żebrowski, first deputy head of the Foreign Department of the Central Committee of the Polish United Workers' Party. Arkadiusz Łaszewicz, chairman of the Central Audit Committee of the Polish United Workers' Party, spoke on behalf of the party authorities.
