= Stanisław Kociołek =

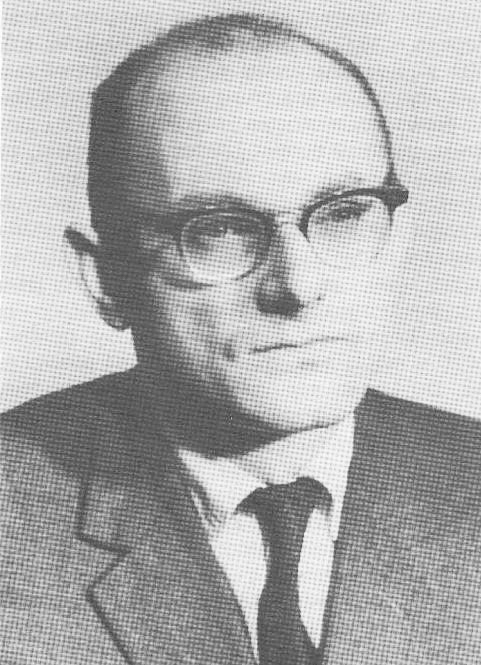

Deputy Prime Minister of Poland
- In office 30 June 1970 – 23 December 1970

Personal details
- Born: 13 March 1929 Warsaw, Second Polish Republic
- Died: 1 October 2015 (aged 82) Warsaw, Poland
- Party: Polish United Workers' Party
- Education: Warsaw University
- Profession: Economist

Stanisław Kociołek (3 May 1933, Warsaw – 1 October 2015), often referred to as the "butcher of Tri-City", was a Communist official who served as deputy prime minister of Poland for six months in 1970. After the fall of Communism, he was charged with crimes committed in Gdańsk and Gdynia during the Polish 1970 protests. Kociołek personally approved the Polish United Workers' Party (PZPR) order issued with Zenon Kliszko, for the regular Army to fire at striking workers in Polish shipyards, which resulted in at least tens of people being killed indiscriminately and hundreds wounded.

== Career ==
Initially, Kociołek worked as head-master at an elementary school near Iława following World War II, and in 1957 graduated from Warsaw University. He joined the communist party at his alma mater, and served as leader of its own PZPR party-cell. He quickly rose to become the first secretary of the Warsaw Committee of PZPR (1958–1960 and 1963–1964), as well as the secretary of Socialist Youth Association. Between December 1967 and July 1970 he was the first secretary of communist party in Gdańsk. During the massacre of shipyard workers in 1970 he served as deputy prime minister. Afterwards, he was sent abroad to various diplomatic posts, for his own safety. He was brought back to Warsaw as the first secretary of the Warsaw Committee of PZPR for the crushing of the Solidarity trade union in November 1980, but during the Martial law in Poland resided in Moscow as ambassador (1982-1985). He returned to Poland in 1985, and was charged with communist crimes in 1995, after the collapse of communism. On 1 October 2015, he died at the age of 82.

== Awards and decorations ==
- Order of the Banner of Labour, 1st Class
- Officer's Cross of the Order of Polonia Restituta
- Gold Cross of Merit
