= Edward Ochab =

Polish politician (1906–1989)

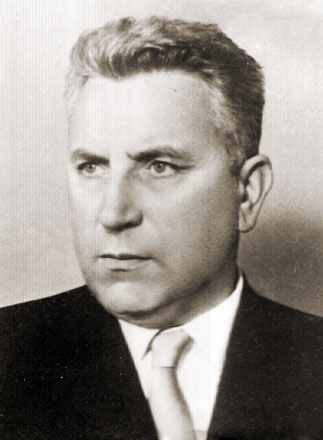
- Ochab c. 1950s

First Secretary of the Polish United Workers' Party
- In office 20 March 1956 – 21 October 1956
- Prime Minister: Józef Cyrankiewicz
- Chairman: Aleksander Zawadzki
- Preceded by: Bolesław Bierut
- Succeeded by: Władysław Gomułka

Chairman of the Council of State of the People's Republic of Poland
- In office 12 August 1964 – 10 April 1968
- Prime Minister: Józef Cyrankiewicz
- First Secretary: Władysław Gomułka
- President in-exile: August Zaleski; Council of Three
- Preceded by: Aleksander Zawadzki
- Succeeded by: Marian Spychalski

Personal details
- Born: 16 August 1906 Kraków, Galicia, Austria-Hungary (now Poland)
- Died: 1 May 1989 (aged 82) Warsaw, Polish People's Republic
- Resting place: Powązki Military Cemetery, Warsaw
- Party: Communist Party of Poland (1929–1938); Polish Workers' Party (1942–1948); Polish United Workers' Party (1948–1968)
- Spouse: Rachela née Silbiger (1907–1996)
- De facto leader of the PPR: ← Bierut; Gomułka →

Edward Ochab (Polish: [ˈɛdvart ˈɔxap]; 16 August 1906 – 1 May 1989) was a Polish communist politician and top leader of Poland between March and October 1956.

As a member of the Communist Party of Poland from 1929, he was repeatedly imprisoned for his activities under the Polish government of the time. In 1939, Ochab participated in the Defense of Warsaw but afterwards moved to the Soviet Union, where he became an early organizer and manager in the Union of Polish Patriots. In 1943, he joined General Berling's Polish Army on the Eastern Front as a political commissar and quickly advanced in its ranks. From 1944 he was a member of the Central Committee of the Polish Workers' Party (PPR) and a deputy in the State National Council. In 1945, he became minister of public administration and held the successive positions of propaganda chief in the PPR (1945–1946), chief of cooperative associations (1947–1948), and chief of the Association of Trade Unions (ZZZ) (1948–1949). From December 1948, he was a deputy member of the (communist) Polish United Workers' Party (PZPR) Politburo, and a full member from 1954.

Between 1949 and 1950, General Ochab was deputy minister of defence and led the political branch of the Armed Forces. In Stalinist Poland, he was responsible for enlisting the so-called enemies of the people to forced labour in the mines of southern Poland. These units were called "battalions of labour". After Bolesław Bierut's death, Ochab became First Secretary of the Polish United Workers' Party and served in that capacity between 20 March and 21 October 1956.

During Ochab's rule, the process of the post-Stalinist "thaw" was well under way, but the first secretary also played a role in authorizing the violent suppression of the worker revolt in Poznań in June. In October, Ochab stood his ground against the Soviet leadership and is credited with helping to prevent a Soviet military intervention. He relinquished power during the VIII Plenum of the Party Central Committee, complying with the wishes of the majority of the Politburo members to promote Władysław Gomułka. Ochab remained a member of the Politburo until 1968 and also worked as minister of agriculture from 1957 to 1959, and later as the secretary of the Central Committee for agricultural affairs. Ochab was deputy chairman of the Polish Council of State (a collective head of state organ) in 1961–1964. He served as chairman of the Council of State in 1964–1968. In 1965–1968 he also chaired the Front of National Unity.

Edward Ochab resigned all of his party and state offices, and withdrew from politics in 1968, in protest of the antisemitic campaign conducted by factions within the Communist Party with First Secretary Gomułka as its head. In his retirement, he remained a dedicated hardline communist, but also a vocal critic of the policies pursued by the regimes of his successors.

== Early life and career ==
Edward Ochab was born in Kraków on 16 August 1906. His father was a clerical official at the central offices of Kraków police. In Kraków, Edward completed elementary and, in 1925, secondary (the Trade Academy) education. In 1926–1927, he attended and graduated from a higher course in cooperative science at the Agricultural Department of the Jagiellonian University. From September 1925, he was employed in a cooperative rural association in Wieliczka. In 1928 became manager in a cooperative enterprise in Radom.

Ochab was drafted and in June 1928 sent to a military school, but was judged there to be of a subversive attitude, apparently a declared communist, permanently employed in worker cooperatives. The school released him in October. Ochab returned to manage his Radom cooperative until February 1930.

== Activist in the Communist Party of Poland ==
Ochab became a member of the Communist Party of Poland in the summer of 1929. In the next ten years, he was arrested five times and spent six and a half years as a political prisoner in Sanation prisons, intermittently released for health reasons (suffered from tuberculosis). When not in prison, he worked in the party executive in Radom, Kraków, Katowice, Warsaw, Łódź, Toruń, Gdynia and Włocławek, frequently relocating or in hiding. Ochab was among the organizers of the miner strikes in Zagłębie Krakowskie (1932), in Zagłębie Dąbrowskie (1935) and the textile worker general strike in Łódź (1936).

Ochab married a fellow communist activist, Rachela Silbiger, a nurse from a "poor and simple" Jewish family. They had four daughters, born in the 1930s and 1940s.

On 7 September 1939, the German forces were approaching Warsaw and the guards in the Warsaw prison where Ochab was held fled. Released by fellow inmates, he traveled toward Garwolin, but having found out about Warsaw's defense preparations, returned to the capital to participate. On 11 September, Ochab joined a workers' defense regiment and fought in the poorly armed unit until the city's capitulation.

To continue his party work and to protect his wife, Ochab then decided to move into the territories controlled by the Soviet Union. He had met "thousands of comrades" (although many perished in Stalin's purges), was thoroughly familiar with the situation on the Polish Left and was ready to get engaged in the rebuilding of the Polish revolutionary movement. With others who shared their point of view, the Ochabs on 2 October embarked on a trip to Siedlce, and from there went to Lwów.

== In the Soviet Union ==
Ochab lived and worked in Lwów until June 1941. He organised there a small circle of Polish communist sympathisers, but in June approached the Soviet authorities, declaring readiness to return to Nazi-occupied Poland for conspiratorial work. However, Germany attacked the Soviet Union, Ochab volunteered for the Red Army and was assigned to an auxiliary unit. In winter, his health problems reappeared and caused him to return to civilian work in the Polish section of a Soviet foreign language publishing institute. In May 1943, the enterprise was moved to Moscow. Ochab became active in the newly formed Union of Polish Patriots there, leading its administrative-economic department.

As the pro-Soviet and communist controlled Polish armed forces were being formed in the Soviet Union, in June 1943, Ochab joined the 1st Tadeusz Kościuszko Infantry Division and was enlisted as a political officer with the rank of second lieutenant. In October 1943, he fought valiantly in the Battle of Lenino, for which he was decorated with both the Polish and Soviet medals for valor. In the summer of 1944, Lieutenant Colonel Ochab was already a member of the Central Committee of the Polish Workers' Party.

== Party and state official 1944–1956 ==
In July 1944 in Lublin, Ochab became an official plenipotentiary of the command of the First Polish Army. In September, he was promoted to the post of the Army's deputy commander for political affairs. He claimed to have participated in the military struggle for Warsaw and in the drive to push across the Vistula at that time. In November, Ochab was discharged from the army and directed to work for the Polish Committee of National Liberation, the nascent communist government, where he became deputy chief of the Public Administration Department. From the beginning of 1945, the PKWN was turned into the Provisional Government and Ochab was an undersecretary in the Ministry of Public Administration, advancing in April to the post of minister. As the plenipotentiary general for the Recovered Territories (previously German lands assumed by Poland), on 25 June 1945, Ochab issued a directive banning and threatening penalties for persecution of Germans still present there or applying repressions like the ones used by the Nazi Germany against Poles. He left the government at the end of June, when it became the Provisional Government of National Unity.

Afterwards, Ochab was a member of the Secretariat and held the position of propaganda chief of the PPR (1945–1946) and of first secretary of the regional PPR branch in Katowice (1946–1948). He returned to his cooperative and worker activities, as chief of worker cooperative associations in 1947–1948, and chief of the Central Council of Trade Unions in 1948–1949. In December 1948, the PPR and the Polish Socialist Party became the single Polish United Workers' Party (PZPR), which was to rule Poland until 1989. In the new party, Ochab became a deputy member of the Politburo (1948–1954).

In one more turn of Ochab's military career, on 1 April 1949, President Bolesław Bierut named him a general and first deputy minister of defense. Minister Michał Rola-Żymierski was replaced in November 1949 by Konstantin Rokossovsky, a Soviet marshal of Polish origin. From January 1950, at the time of increasing Sovietization of the Polish military, Ochab led the political division of the armed forces. In June, Rokossovsky discharged him from active military service and from his assignments at the Ministry of Defense.

In 1950–1952, Ochab chaired the Polish–Soviet Friendship Society. He was secretary of the Central Committee from 1950, responsible for the area of ideology. From 1952, he also led the Central Committee's supervision of the military's political division.

At that time and later in his career, Ochab had a tendency to express his views in radical and uncompromising terms. When Cardinal Stefan Wyszyński was arrested on 25 September 1953, Ochab published an article fiercely critical of the primate in Trybuna Ludu, the party's official newspaper. In regard to the persecution and imprisonment of Władysław Gomułka, Ochab later blamed Stalin and Beria, rather than Bierut or Jakub Berman.

At the PZPR's Second Congress in March 1954, Ochab finally became a full Politburo member. By many in the party, he was considered an "heir apparent" and was ready to take over when First Secretary Bierut died in Moscow in March 1956.

== First secretary of the Polish United Workers' Party ==
First Secretary Nikita Khrushchev of the Communist Party of the Soviet Union attended Bierut's funeral and stayed in Warsaw to participate in the deliberations of the PZPR Central Committee's 6th Plenum, charged with electing a new first secretary. Aleksander Zawadzki was the other major candidate, but in the end Edward Ochab was chosen unanimously on 20 March 1956. Ochab was seen as a compromise candidate by the rival Puławy and Natolin factions of the party. Soon, he was perceived as connected with the more liberal Puławy group.

In June 1956, Ochab attended a Comecon gathering of leaders in Moscow. He displayed his confrontational style when responding to accusations of the supposedly inadequate supplies of coal from Poland. But the encounter also made him doubt his long term suitability as a first secretary.

After the PZPR's 6th Plenum and Ochab's election, the processes of de-Stalinization in Poland entered their accelerated phase. The press critically discussed the previously prohibited subjects. The party was split and preoccupied with its internal affairs. The Sejm (national legislature), until then unable to exercise any real influence, used the opportunity and declared a wide amnesty, which included, in the first place, the trespasses of political nature. By 20 May, half of the 70,000 prisoners nationwide found themselves free. Numerous officials deemed responsible for the Stalinist abuses were removed from their positions, including Berman, who resigned as a Politburo member in early May. Segments of Polish society, including intellectuals, youth (especially academic), and even heavy industry workers, were in a state of agitation and reclaiming their inherent and sovereign rights, known in Polish as podmiotowość.

What was happening under Ochab's watch turned out not to be a semi-controlled evolution of the system, because on 28 June workers in Poznań's Cegielski industrial enterprise, frustrated with their inability to redress grievances through official channels, went on strike and rioted. Other workers and Poznań residents joined and violence ensued. Ochab gave Minister of Defense Rokossovsky permission to bring military units to the city and use the force necessary to bring the "counterrevolutionary" revolt under control. Several dozens of mostly civilians were killed and massive damage sustained during the two days of fighting.

The Central Committee's 7th Plenum deliberated in the second half of July. It placed partial blame for the Poznań protests on bureaucratic and economic errors. Liberalization and democratization were discussed and the decision was made to readmit to the party the previously expelled Gomułka, Spychalski and Kliszko. Gomułka's "right-wing nationalist deviation" charge was upheld, but both the Puławy and Natolin factions were promoting the idea of his return to power. Ochab, who in 1948 strongly attacked Gomułka, was now overcoming his personal objections and evolving toward entrusting the former PPR chief a high office. On 31 July, delegated by the Politburo, Ochab and Zawadzki had their initial meeting with Gomułka that lasted several hours. Subsequently, the Polish Radio broadcast the information of Gomułka's return to the party.

In September, Ochab told Józef Cyrankiewicz to offer Gomułka a position that Cyrankiewicz would be competent to offer. Cyrankiewicz offered Gomułka his own job, that of prime minister. Gomułka thought the move was premature and rejected the proposition. It became apparent to the PZPR establishment that Gomułka was aiming at replacing Ochab as first secretary. Gomulka was invited to participate in Politburo conferences that took place on 12, 15 and 17 October.

The 8th Plenum was summoned for 19 October. The public was informed of the date and of Gomułka's participation in the Politburo meetings by the Polish Press Agency. A statute Ochab submitted to be presented to the Plenum was criticized by Roman Zambrowski and Zawadzki. The majority of the Politburo members voted to reduce the body to nine members and the proposed list did not include Minister Rokossovsky.

The Soviets were increasingly worried by the plans of the leadership of the PZPR and the Soviet ambassador presented on 17 October Nikita Khrushchev's "invitation" for the Polish leaders to immediately visit Moscow. Ochab objected to the timing and refused to make the trip. The Soviets reacted with the announcement (18 October) of Khrushchev's and the Soviet delegation's arrival in Warsaw on 19 October, the day the 8th Plenum was set to begin its deliberations. On 18 October, the Polish Politburo, unhappy with the prospect of Soviet meddling (or the appearance of such meddling) with the Plenum debate, designated Ochab, Cyrankiewicz, Zawadzki and Gomułka to greet the Soviets at the airport.

Their arrival was preceded by ominous military moves. Soviet formations present in Poland were moving toward Warsaw and were stopped less than one hundred kilometers from the capital. Units in East Germany were put in a state of readiness and a number of Soviet warships approached the Bay of Gdańsk. Under the direction of Ochab, who "stood firmly in defense of Poland's sovereignty", the Polish Army and internal security forces were placed in defensive positions on the approaches to Warsaw, and the buildings where the PZPR Plenum and the meetings with the Soviet delegation were to take place were secured. It is not clear what the intentions of the formations controlled by Minister of Defense Rokossovsky and commanders loyal to him were. An even greater crisis was not far off, because the Soviets did not inform the Polish air defenses of their coming and Polish fighter jets scrambled to confront the plane entering the Polish air space. At the military airfield, Khrushchev first greeted a separate group of Soviet generals, then approached the Polish comrades, shaking his fist and shouting derogatory comments.

The 8th Plenum conducted some introductory business and suspended deliberations to allow the leadership to attend the separate talks with the Soviet leaders. The negotiations with the Soviets were very difficult and lasted until 1 AM. Khrushchev objected to the planned Politburo changes and the lack of "fraternal consultations", including the removal of Marshal Rokossovsky, noticed the increased activity of anti-Soviet elements in Poland and threatened an active military intervention. Ochab replied that the Soviet leaders themselves would not consult changes in their leadership with the Poles. He, Gomułka, Cyrankiewicz and Zambrowski tried to reassure the Soviets that their interests were not under threat. During a break, the Soviet delegation went to its embassy for internal talks and took Minister Rokossovsky with them.

After their return, the Soviets displayed a more friendly approach, but Khrushchev was worried that Gomułka, the presumed next Polish communist party leader, might be a social democrat. Gomułka, replied Cyrankiewicz, combined Polish patriotism with loyalty to the Soviet Union. Ochab told Khrushchev that under the circumstances, Gomułka was the best choice to lead the country, denying the Soviets the hope of taking advantage of a split within the Polish party. The conciliatory but unyielding attitude displayed by the Polish negotiators and the widespread popular support they were obviously enjoying convinced the Soviet Presidium to cancel the military moves in progress and defer further negotiations to Gomułka's agreed visit in Moscow in November. Early on 20 October, the Soviet delegation departed, letting the 8th Plenum continue its business undisturbed.

Ochab decided not to oppose Gomułka's rise to power because he realized that a divided party would give the Soviets a perfect excuse to intervene. He could have easily allied himself with Marshal Rokossovsky and other discarded Politburo members, but he placed Poland's interests over his own career. In his own mind, Ochab rightfully submitted to the will of the Politburo and the Central Committee. He was no fan of Gomułka and felt that promoting Gomułka as the savior of Poland, unavoidably in the making, would be demeaning to the entire Polish party. But Edward Ochab did all he could to save Poland from tragic events on a mass scale, like the ones that were soon experienced by Hungary.

== Work in agriculture and as head of state ==
Ochab remained a member of the new, reduced in size Politburo. He was seen as close to the factions of Zambrowski and Gomułka in the party. In May 1957, already after the previous collectivization of Polish agriculture had been largely reversed, he became the minister of agriculture. At that time, Ochab supported individual farmers and their small associations, not the large cooperatives previously favored by the state. The weaker of the state-owned State Agricultural Farms (PGR) Ochab turned into cooperative units. In October 1959, Ochab gave up his ministerial position, but continued his supervisory role in the same area as a secretary of the Central Committee responsible for agricultural affairs.

In addition, in 1961, Ochab became deputy chairman of the Council of State, a collective head of state organ. After the Fourth Congress of the PZPR (June 1964), he retained his membership in the Politburo and the position of the Central Committee secretary. However, in August, Chairman Aleksander Zawadzki died, and Ochab assumed the function of the chairman of the Council of State. He would now receive foreign leaders as the official representative of the Polish state. In March 1966, Ochab notified Primate Stefan Wyszyński that Pope Paul VI was being denied his request to visit Poland for the celebrations of the Millennium of Polish Christianity because of the Vatican's continuing diplomatic relations with the Polish government-in-exile.

== March 1968 ==
The events in Poland usually described under the March 1968 heading actually began after the Six-Day War between Israel and the Arab countries in June 1967. On 19 June, First Secretary Gomułka spoke in Warsaw to a labor union congress and implicitly referred to the Polish Jewish population as the fifth column. Ochab insisted that the term should be deleted from the published transcript of the speech, and it was.

The widely publicized student demonstrations in Warsaw took place on 8 March 1968. On 19 March, Gomułka delivered another major televised speech. Reviewing with other Politburo members its text in advance, Ochab objected to Gomułka's reference to "student youth of Jewish origin". The Jewish youth were justifiably sensitive because of the millions of Jews killed in Poland during World War II, he argued.

Ochab's and Gomułka's wives were Jewish, but unlike Gomułka, Ochab displayed no tolerance for the antisemitic excesses. To protest the policies pursued in 1967–1968 in Poland, he decided to resign all of his state and party offices, effectively retiring from political life. He wrote appropriate letters to the Politburo and the Sejm and had a final conversation with Gomułka, Cyrankiewicz and Kliszko. He wrote of the "antisemitic campaign organized by the various reactionary elements, yesterday's phalangists and their today's highly placed protectors" (Mieczysław Moczar's faction in the party). The Politburo accepted his resignation on 8 April and three days later, the Sejm replaced Ochab with Marian Spychalski as chairman of the Council of State. General Wojciech Jaruzelski, the armed forces chief of staff, replaced Spychalski as the minister of defense.

== In retirement ==
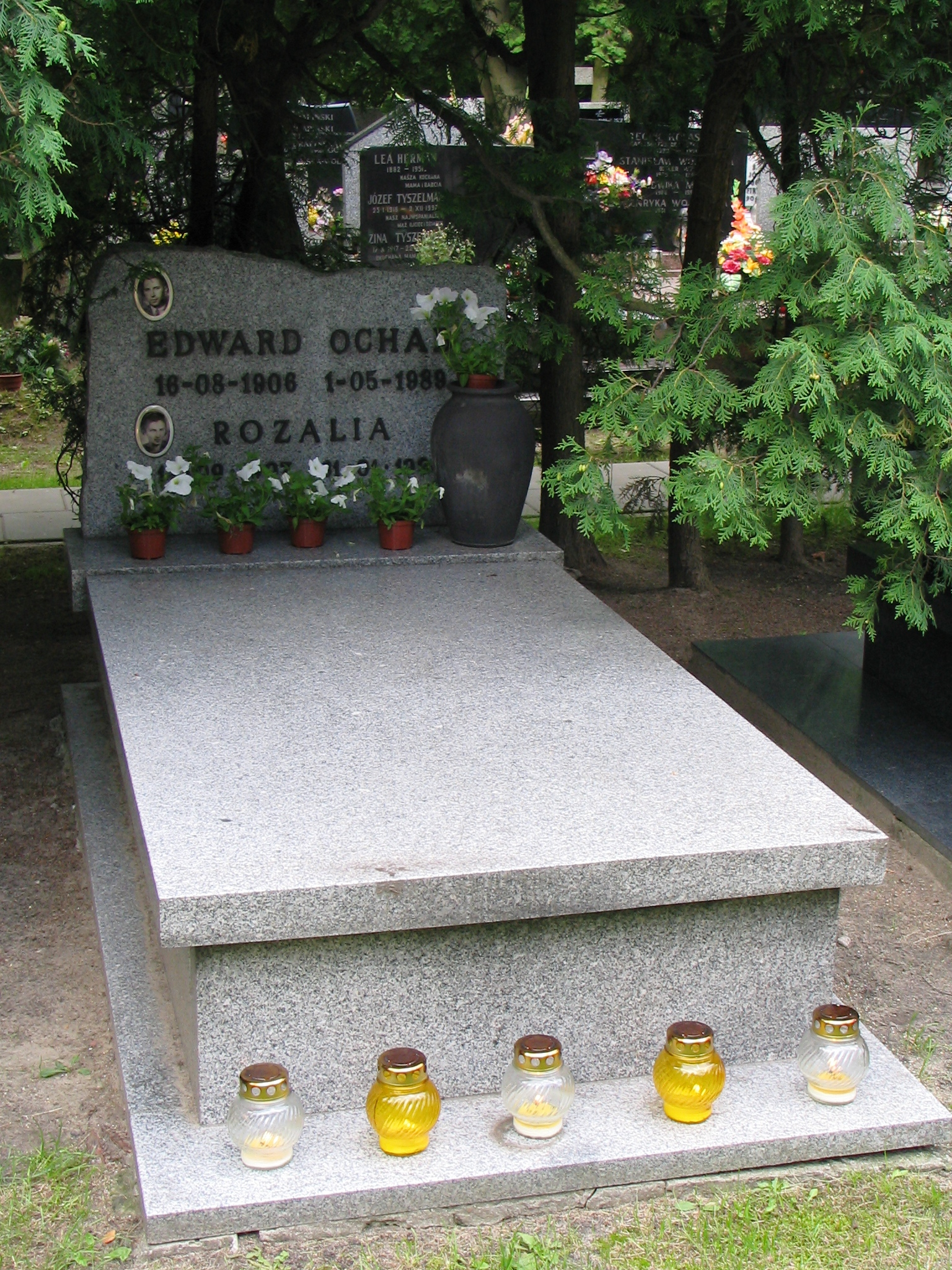
Grave of Edward Ochab and wife Rozalia at the Powązki Military Cemetery in Warsaw

Ochab first proceeded to safeguard the documents that secured his historical role, the forty years he had been active in the communist movement. He witnessed Gomułka's fall from power in 1970 and the generational change in the PZPR and later expressed highly critical opinions regarding the use of force against the protesting workers, even though he himself had made comparable decisions in 1956.

He carefully observed the dealings of the new leadership of Edward Gierek. When the Party's "Guidelines" were published before its Sixth Congress and the rank and file was asked to debate them, Ochab took advantage of the opportunity and typed up on 30 September 1971 several pages of Introductory Critical Comments. The letter, which included reformist, revisionist or social democratic ideas, caused an uproar because it was soon published by the Polish émigré Kultura journal in Paris under the title Edward Ochab in the Opposition.

The former first secretary criticized the advancing for managerial party and state jobs of cynical career-oriented people, serving only the autocrat (Gomułka) and his circle. He called for measures preventing such "deformations" now and in the future. He proposed a radical reduction in the scope and budget of the Ministry of Internal Affairs and a removal from positions of responsibility of "non-reformable bureaucrats, career-minded people, hooded ONR followers, anti-semites, nationalists and morally deprived people". The "completely inert" Sejm should be competitively elected from separate lists of the participating parties and activists not affiliated with any party (members in the Front of National Unity), which would be applauded by the electorate and "our brothers, the Western communists". The peculiarities of Ochab's proposed solutions included advocating the original "Leninist" ways, such as the establishment of Worker Delegate Councils in enterprises, and his belief that old comrades from the prewar Communist Party of Poland ought to be returned to power. Stripped of its Leninist phraseology, the idea of powerful Worker Councils could be interpreted as a call for a massive labor union movement (delegates elected in all institutions employing one hundred or more people would collectively constitute a second chamber of parliament), something attempted several years later by Solidarity. Such postulates (or their dissemination abroad) could not have been well received by the PZPR's new leadership and Ochab and his views were severely rebuked. During a dispute in his local party organisation, Ochab warned that the current investment policy was still wrong, "the economy will collapse, which will create a new December".

From 13 November 1971 to 19 January 1972, Ochab and his wife took a Western Europe coast and Mediterranean Sea cruise on board a Polish merchant ship. During the journey, they were closely followed by the Polish secret services, but the government picked up the entire cost.

In October 1977, Ochab was one of the signatories of the letter addressed to First Secretary Gierek and the Politburo. It was signed by a group of intellectuals and former party activists and was highly critical of Gierek's team's political and economic record. The letter referred to the protests of the previous year and called for fundamental political and democratizing reforms. Repressions and restrictions would only aggravate the crisis, the authors wrote, and an open societal dialogue was necessary. Free elections to the Sejm and local councils and especially close partnership with labor unions were urged as prerequisites to any real improvement in the country's precarious internal situation.

In November 1979, as the PZPR's Eighth Congress was approaching, Ochab wrote a ten-page letter To Comrades Communists, which Jerzy Eisler characterizes as highly ideological, detached from practical usefulness. Most of the current party leadership, wrote Ochab, referring to the events of prewar Poland, "had not participated in the fight against the fascist organs of the Polish bourgeoisie power", too many "did not appreciate the historic importance of the communists' fight against the shameful rule of the reactionary Polish bourgeoisie". Later in the letter, Ochab engaged in polemics with the recent works of Polish historians, which he interpreted as a creeping rehabilitation and legitimisation of the Sanation regime. "Such works clearly lead to a whitewashing of the reactionary rule of our capitalists and big landowners, to the slighting of the historic role of the communists in the fight against fascism and the hostile to the masses terrorist policies of the Piłsudskiites, National Democrats (ONR). The venerable professors negate the fascist character of the post-May governments". The former first secretary, who had spent a considerable part of his younger years in Sanation prisons, wrote also of the responsibility for the "spilled blood of thousands of workers and peasants murdered during the strikes and occupations, in antisemitic and anti-Ukrainian pogroms, prison and Bereza Kartuzka persecutions" resting with the "dull military regime, blinded by the hatred for the Soviet Union, the subjugated nations and the Polish masses". Finally Ochab denounced the current "anti-socialist groups", which slandered the people's democracy and Marxism; "they dream of anti-socialist activation of the Polish ayatollahs" (Catholic Church hierarchy). Ochab felt uneasy about both the emerging great independent worker movement, the future Solidarity, and his own "communist" party that he had found so much fault with.

Edward Ochab died on 1 May 1989, between the conclusion of the Round Table groundbreaking negotiations and the historic elections of 4 June, which marked the beginning of the systemic change in Poland. At Ochab's funeral on 8 May at the Powązki Military Cemetery, Stefan Jędrychowski stressed his role in the dissemination of Khrushchev's secret report among the PZPR members in March 1956. Ochab was deeply disappointed by the Sino-Soviet split, Jędrychowski said, and welcomed Mikhail Gorbachev's reforms as long-awaited and giving reasons for hope.

== Awards and honours ==
- Polish People's Republic:
  - Order of the Builders of People's Poland
  - Order of the Banner of Labour (1st class)
  - Order of the Cross of Grunwald (2nd class)
  - Order of the Cross of Grunwald (3rd class)
  - Silver Cross of the Virtuti Militari
  - Cross of Valour
  - Gold Cross of Merit
  - Medal "For Your and Our Freedom"
  - Silesian Uprising Cross
  - Medal of the 30th Anniversary of People's Poland
  - Medal of the 40th Anniversary of People's Poland
  - Medal for Warsaw 1939–1945
  - Medal of the 10th Anniversary of People's Poland
  - Medal of Ludwik Waryński
  - Badge of the 1000th Anniversary of the Polish State
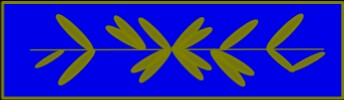
  - Honorary Badge of the City of Poznań
- Other countries:
  - Grand Cross of the Legion of Honour (France)
  - Grand Cross of the Order of the White Rose of Finland (Finland)
  - Knight Grand Cross with Collar of the Order of Merit of the Italian Republic (Italy)
  - Collar of the Order of Pahlavi (Imperial State of Iran)
  - Grand Cordon of the Order of the Queen of Sheba (Ethiopian Empire)
  - Grand Cordon of the Order of the Nile (Egypt)
  - Cross of Military Order of the White Lion (Czechoslovakia)
  - Order of the Red Star (Soviet Union)
  - Jubilee Medal "In Commemoration of the 100th Anniversary of the Birth of Vladimir Ilyich Lenin" (Soviet Union)

== See also ==
- Chaim Wolnerman, "Water Carriers"
- "Edward Ochab Is Dead; Poland Ex-Official, 83". The New York Times. 3 May 1989.
- Them: Stalin's Polish Puppets by Teresa Torańska

Political offices
Preceded by Aleksander Zawadzki	Chairman of the Polish Council of State; 12 August 1964 – 10 April 1968	Succeeded by Marian Spychalski
Party political offices
Preceded by Bolesław Bierut	General Secretary of the Polish United Workers' Party; 20 March 1956 – 21 October 1956	Succeeded by Władysław Gomułka
