= Stefan Matuszewski =

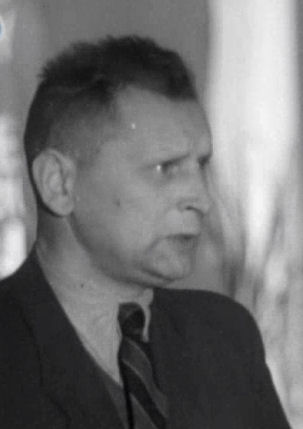

Minister of Information and Propaganda
- In office 31 December 1944 – 6 September 1946

Personal details
- Born: 1 August 1895 Giżyna
- Died: 21 March 1985 (aged 79) Warsaw, Poland
- Resting place: Powązki Military Cemetery
- Party: Polish United Workers' Party
- Education: University of Warsaw

Stefan Matuszewski (2 December 1905 – 21 March 1985) was a Polish educator and politician, educated theologist and philosopher, member of the presidium of the Main Board of the Polish–Soviet Friendship Society. Minister of Information and Propaganda (1944–1946), member of the State Council (1952–1957), member of the National Council of Poland and the Sejm of the People's Republic of Poland of the first convocation.

== Biography ==
He was born in Giżyna into a peasant family of Józef and Antonina. He was one of the founding members of the Society of Lovers of the City of Poznań. He graduated from the Faculty of Catholic Theology of the University of Warsaw in 1930 and was ordained a priest; from 1931 to 1937 vicar and prefect of schools in the following parishes: Kamieńczyk, Rembertów, Skierniewice and Warsaw. in 1937 he resigned from the priesthood and became a member of the Polish Socialist Party as well as its vice chairman, he was active in socialist circles and in the Society of the Workers' University, he was the editor of "Chłopska Prawda" and the chairman of the district committee of PPS Targówek. During World War II he stayed in the Soviet Union, from 1939 to 1943 he taught Latin and Greek at the Medical Institute in Donbas, in 1943–1944 an officer in the 1st Polish Army. In 1944, he belonged to the corps of political and educational officers of the 1st Tadeusz Kościuszko Infantry Division.

He was an ember of the authorities of the "Lublin" department of the Polish Socialist Party in the years 1944–1946 and in 1948 a member of the Supreme Council and the Central Executive Committee, in the years 1944–1945 secretary of the CEC, in 1945 secretary general of the CEC, in 1945 (in later months) vice-chairman of the CEC, in 1948 a member of the Commission Polityczna CKW and the chairman of the Provincial Committee of the PPS Warsaw Voivodship. In 1944 (September–December) he served as deputy head of the Ministry of Information and Propaganda of the Polish Committee of National Liberation, in the years 1944–1946 Minister of Information and Propaganda. In 1948 he was secretary of the Central Committee of Trade Unions. He was a vocal speaker for the merger of the PPS with the Polish Workers' Party on terms dictated by the communists.

From 1948 a member of the Polish United Workers' Party, in 1948–1954 a member of the Central Committee and deputy member of its Politburo, in 1948–1949 First Secretary of the Warsaw Voivodeship Committee of the Polish United Workers' Party, and in 1952–1954 head of the Administrative Department of the Central Committee. In the years 1954–1959, a member of the Central Audit Committee of the Polish United Workers' Party and its chairman in the years 1954–1958. Considered an influential figure among the Natolin faction during the struggle for power in the leadership of the Polish United Workers' Party in the 1950s.

In the years 1949–1952, the Government's plenipotentiary for the fight against illiteracy, in the years 1952–1957 he was a member of the State Council. From 1958, he was a research and teaching employee at the University of Warsaw. In 1944–1947, he was a member of the National Council of Poland, and in 1952–1956, he was a member of the Sejm of the People's Republic of Poland of the 1st convocation. In the years 1945–1953, he was the chairman of the Main Board of the later the League of Friends of the Soldier (Polish: Liga Przyjaciół Żołnierza). In 1951 he received the State Award (Polish: Odznaka Nagrody Państwowej) of the 3rd degree.

His wife was the historian Wilhelmina Matuszewska. He rests with his wife and daughter Joanna in the Avenue of Merit of the Powązki Military Cemetery.
