= Mieczysław Moczar =

Polish communist politician (1913–1986)

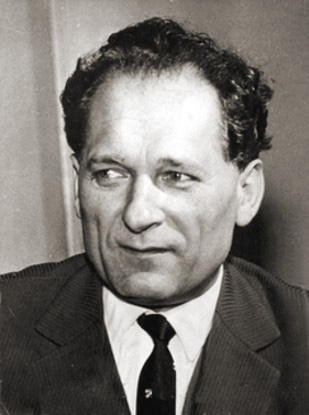
- Moczar c. 1965

Minister of Interior
- In office 12 December 1964 – 15 July 1968
- Prime Minister: Józef Cyrankiewicz
- Preceded by: Władysław Wicha
- Succeeded by: Kazimierz Świtała

Personal details
- Born: Mikołaj Diomko; 23 December 1913 Łódź, Congress Poland, Russian Empire (today Poland)
- Died: 1 November 1986 (aged 72) Warsaw, Poland
- Party: Polish United Workers' Party
- Other political affiliations: Communist Party of Poland (until 1938); Polish Workers' Party (1942–1948)
- Awards: Order of the Builders of People's Poland; Order of Polonia Restituta; Virtuti Militari; Order of the Cross of Grunwald; Order of the Banner of Labour; Cross of Valour; Partisan Cross

Military service
- Allegiance: Second Polish Republic, Soviet Union
- Branch/service: Gwardia Ludowa; Armia Ludowa
- Years of service: 1939–1948
- Rank: Major General
- Battles/wars: Second World War; Anti-communist resistance in Poland (1944–1953)

Mieczysław Moczar (Polish pronunciation: [mjɛˈt͡ʂɨswaf ˈmɔt͡ʂar]; birth name Mikołaj Diomko, pseudonym Mietek, 23 December 1913 – 1 November 1986) was a Polish communist politician who played a prominent role in the history of the Polish People's Republic. He is most known for his position Endo-Communism, which influenced Polish United Workers' Party politics in the late 1960s. Moczar was heavily involved in the March 1968 events in Poland against Polish Jews, in which he led the faction of hardliners inside the Communist Party.

== Biography ==
=== Early life ===
Moczar's father was Orthodox Belarusian and an activist of the Communist Party of Poland, and his mother was a Polish Catholic. Moczar was a member of the Communist Party before World War II. During the occupation, Moczar organized communist guerillas in the Lublin and Kielce regions. His active role in the Communist underground during the resistance allowed him to become known as "the leader of Poland's 'Partisans'" in the 1960s. Immediately following World War II, Moczar became the secret police chief in Łódź, but was dismissed from his position in 1952 on charges of "nationalist deviation." During this "period of widespread suspicion against the self-made Communist veterans of the Communist resistance," Moczar was briefly held in detention. When Władysław Gomułka returned to power as the First Secretary of the Polish United Workers' Party in 1956, Moczar started to work for the Interior Ministry.

In the early 1960s, Moczar served as Vice Minister of the Interior.

=== Minister of the Interior ===
In December 1964, he was named the Minister of the Interior, a position he retained until 1968.

Moczar's position as Minister of the Interior placed him in charge of the police. When Moczar was appointed to this position in 1964, it was perceived to be "a reaction to recent liberalizing trends in Poland." Gomułka, who was known for his centralist approach, was seen as trying to balance contending factions in the party and Government by appointing Moczar. Moczar was known for favoring stricter police controls and discouraging Poles from any foreign contacts. According to a New York Times article from the time, "General Moczar's promotion is... regarded by many Poles as symbolic of the increased police activity that has occurred since the great liberalization at the end of the Stalinist period in 1956." Lajos Lederer, a correspondent for the London Observer, called Moczar "a de Gaulle-type figure who is both an authoritarian Communist and a strong Polish nationalist."

A popular joke in Poland from the time period illustrates how the average citizen viewed Moczar. "What do you get when you take away the 'czar' from Moczar?" (Czar is pronounced like Char and means charm in Polish). The answer is "Mo," which were the initials for the Polish police, "Milicja Obywatelska".

=== The "Partisan" faction ===
Moczar's main power base was the communist party faction called the "Partisans". Most of the "Partisans" were men in their 40s and 50s, who were veterans of the Communist underground like Moczar himself. Moczar tended to play down the significance of the role of the Home Army while glorifying smaller pro-Communist resistance movements. The "Partisans" used Polish nationalism to gain support. Within the party, the enemy of the "Partisans" was the "Muscovite" faction: Poles who had escaped to the Soviet Union during World War II and then returned with the Red Army. Some of the "Muscovites" were Polish Jews trained and supported by the Soviet Union who held important roles in the party and the secret police during the period of Stalinist terror. Moczar took advantage of this in his campaign and in the mid-1960s, the nationalism of some of the "Partisans" began to take on antisemitic tones.

=== March 1968 ===
At that time, Moczar became the leader of an influential faction of "partisans" fighting for power in the Polish United Workers' Party. He consistently built his image of a partisan hero, the symbol of which was "The Colors of the Battle"—Moczar's quickly filmed memories of the war, which had as many as thirteen editions. To this day, it has not been possible to establish who their author was, because the suspected writer Wojciech Żukrowski categorically denied it. But it was certainly not Moczar himself, whose reluctance to express his thoughts in writing was legendary. He liked to speak for it, especially to his subordinates, and the preserved records of these speeches are an important testimony of the era. For example, in 1965 he lamented the excessive frequency of Poles' visits to Western embassies while boasting that 1.5 thousand citizens are monitored by the ministry in connection with their contacts with foreign diplomats. Another time he rebuked his opponents from the Puławy faction, saying: "... yesterday's organizers of evil, depravity, they became the organizers of renewal, humanism and, at the same time, the creators of anti-Soviet propaganda, despite the fact that until now without the words "with the Soviet Union at the fore"—they were unable to construct even the simplest sentence. Now the same people: Stefan Staszewski, Werfel, Woroszylski and quite a large group of them like them—consider themselves humanists. ... What a bottomless perfidy lies in them".

When student protests erupted in March 1968, Moczar wanted to suppress them by brute force. It was widely believed that Gomułka's reliance on Moczar during the 1968 events made Moczar "become too strong for [Gomułka's] safety." Moczar used the student uprising to initiate an antisemitic campaign, and he soon became a driving force in the 1968 purging of Jews from important party and government posts. He accused Jewish students of having instigated the demonstrations. Observers speculated two chief purposes for Moczar's antisemitic campaign: "to clear Jews out of responsible positions so those can be filled by General Moczar's supporters, and to fix responsibility on non-Jewish leaders, probably including Mr. Gomułka, for failure to act more decisively against what Moczar called 'the Zionist Infiltration'". The Moczar-driven campaign of antisemitism caused a mass emigration of Polish Jews in 1968, most of which were government operatives and officials as well as doctors, professors, lawyers, or engineers.

=== Gomułka versus Moczar ===
In 1968, Gomułka was re-elected First Secretary and thus prevented Moczar from gaining more power. Gomułka, whose wife was Jewish, began to isolate Moczar by removing anti-Semitic propagandists close to Moczar and by removing his supporters from key positions. A report from Radio Free Europe in 1971 refers to Gomułka's campaign as an attempt to "de-Moczarize" the security service and mass media. By 1969, Moczar was no longer Gomułka's main rival but remained a member of the Central Committee and a member of its Politburo. However, Moczar had a hand in the December 1970 shootings in Gdynia, which resulted from Grzegorz Korczyński's assessment of the situation and recommendations in the striking Gdansk region. The bloody December strikes brought down Gomułka and replaced him with Edward Gierek, a technocrat who emphasized economic progress. The Russians, who suspected Moczar of plotting, preferred Gierek rather than an ardent nationalist communist with illustrious wartime past. Moczar was eliminated from power by Gierek to return briefly in 1980 as a possible replacement for Stanisław Kania when he was eased out by General Wojciech Jaruzelski.

He wrote Barwy walki (The colours of a fight or Colors of Struggle or Color of Battle, first released in 1962) (1963, 1979, 1988) Published by Krajowa Agencja Wydawnicza, ISBN 83-03-02246-6.

This book is a personal memoir by General Moczar. It was made into a movie in 1965 and is viewed as an effort to strengthen the "Partisans" as it "depicts the Partisans as the spearhead of Polish resistance".

=== Subsequent life ===
Moczar was a highly placed member of the Polish United Workers' Party, a member of its Central Committee from 1965 to 1981 (one of its secretaries in 1968–1971) a candidate member of the Politburo in 1968–1970 and a full member from 1970 to 1971 and from 1980 to 1981. He was a general in the Polish People's Army and held many high level posts in the government, serving as Minister of the Interior (1964–1968) and chairman of the Supreme Chamber of Control of Poland (1971–1983).

== Promotions ==
- Porucznik (Lieutenant) – July 1943
- Omission of the rank of Kapitan (Captain)
- Major (Major) – September 1943
- Podpułkownik (Lieutenant colonel) – April 1944
- Pułkownik (Colonel) – October 1944
- Generał brygady (Brigadier general) – July 1947
- Generał dywizji (Major general) – 1963

== Awards and decorations ==
Polish:
Order of the Builders of People's Poland (1964)
Order of the Banner of Labour 2nd class (1954)
Order of the Cross of Grunwald 2nd class (1945)
Order of Polonia Restituta Commander's Cross (1947)
Order of Polonia Restituta Officer's Cross (1945)
Virtuti Militari Golden Cross (1945)
Cross of Valour (1946)
Partisan Cross (1946)
Medal for Warsaw 1939–1945 (1946)
Medal of Victory and Freedom 1945
Medal "For participation in the fights in defense of the people's power"
Medal of the 30th Anniversary of People's Poland
Medal of the 10th Anniversary of People's Poland
Medal of Ludwik Waryński
Foreign:
Order of the Red Banner (USSR)
Jubilee Medal "In Commemoration of the 100th Anniversary of the Birth of Vladimir Ilyich Lenin" (USSR)
Jubilee Medal "Twenty Years of Victory in the Great Patriotic War 1941–1945" (USSR)
Jubilee Medal "Thirty Years of Victory in the Great Patriotic War 1941–1945" (USSR)
Jubilee Medal "Forty Years of Victory in the Great Patriotic War 1941–1945" (USSR)

== See also ==
- Albin Siwak
