= Roman Nowak =

Polish politician (1900–1980)

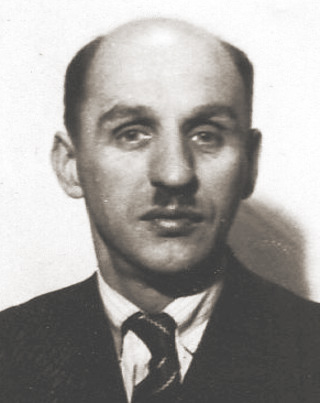

Member of the Polish State Council
- In office 1957–1969

Personal details
- Born: 21 July 1900 Chorzów, Kingdom of Prussia
- Died: 26 September 1980 (aged 80) Warsaw, Poland
- Resting place: Powązki Military Cemetery
- Party: Polish United Workers' Party
- Education: University of Warsaw

Roman Nowak (21 July 1900 – 26 September 1980) was a Polish locksmith and Communist politician. Member of the Legislative Sejm and the Sejm of the People's Republic of Poland of the 1st, 2nd, 3rd and 4th term, a member of the State Council in 1957–1969 as well as a member of the Politburo of the Polish United Workers' Party of the Central Committee of the Polish United Workers' Party.

== Biography ==
Nowak was born in Chorzów into working-class family of Jan and Agata. From 1914 to 1917 he was a train driver at the "Kościuszko" Steelworks, and then until 1924 a locksmith at the Chorzów Power Plant. He received secondary education. From 1921 he was a member of the Communist Party of Upper Silesia, then from 1922 the Communist Workers' Party of Poland (from 1925 the Communist Party of Poland). From 1925 to 1937 he was a party functionary in Silesia and Warsaw, he was a member of the secretariat of the Central Committee of the Communist Party of Poland. In the years 1924–1931 he belonged to the Communist Youth Union of Poland. He took part in the 2nd and 3rd Silesian Uprising. He stayed in the USSR at the Leninist school and aspirantura (in the years 1925–1926 and 1932–1934), from 1937 in Czechoslovakia, and in the years 1938–1946 in Bolivia, where he participated in the life of the emigration community.

He returned to Poland in November 1946 and became a member of the Polish Workers' Party, where he became an instructor of the Party Voivodeship Committee in Katowice, from where in 1947 he became the second secretary. He also became a deputy member of the Central Committee of the Polish Workers' Party. In 1948, together with the Polish Workers' Party, he joined the Polish United Workers' Party, in which he initially held the same functions (in the KW until 1950, and in the Central Committee until 1954). In the years 1950–1956 he was the first secretary of the Party Voivodeship Committee in Opole. He was also promoted to the highest authorities of the Polish United Workers' Party, sitting in the Central Committee in 1954–1968, and in 1956 (from July to October) in the Politburo of the Central Committee. In the 1950s, he was associated with the "Puławianie" faction. In the years 1956–1968, he was the chairman of the Central Commission for Party Control of the Polish United Workers' Party (in November 1968 he was replaced in this position by Zenon Nowak).

In the years 1947–1969 he was a member of the Legislative Sejm and the Sejm of the People's Republic of Poland of the 1st, 2nd, 3rd and 4th term. In 1957–1969 he served as a member of the State Council. He retired in 1969.

He was buried with military honors at the Powązki Military Cemetery in Warsaw. On behalf of the then authorities, the funeral was attended by a member of the Politburo of the Central Committee of the Polish United Workers' Party, chairman of the Central Party Control Commission, Władysław Kruczek. On behalf of the Central Committee of the PZPR, he was farewelled by vice-chairman of the, Henryk Marian.
