= Albin Siwak =

Polish politician (1933–2019)

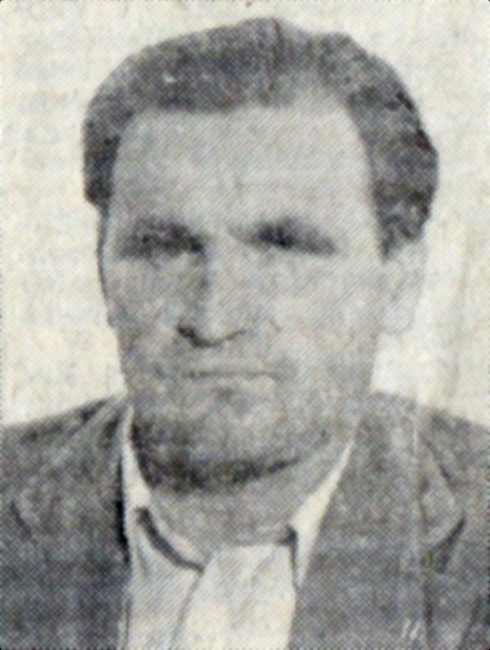
Albin Siwak in 1981

Albin Siwak (January 27, 1933 – April 4, 2019) was a Polish politician, construction worker and a trade union figure, who acted as a government-sponsored antagonist of opposition leader Lech Wałęsa during the 1980s. After his career in the People's Republic, Siwak held nationalist and antisemitic views, arguing that Solidarity had been a Jewish conspiracy. He was a national communist.

== Biography ==
Son of Józef and Czesława née Mielczarek. He was born in Wołomin. In 1935 he and his family moved to Praga. His father was a member of the Polish Socialist Party, his mother worked as a housewife. He spent World War II and occupation of Poland with his family in Warsaw. After the war, he and his father left for the Recovered Territories, where in the village of Lutry. He completed seven classes of elementary school.

In 1950 he went to Warsaw in search of work. He was directed to the masonry brigade. He quickly became a shock worker and then a foreman. He took part in the construction of Nowa Huta. From the 1950s he was an active activist in trade unions. From 1968 he belonged to the Polish United Workers' Party. He was delegate for the VIII, IX and X Congress of the Polish United Workers' Party. In 1979, the Congress of Trade Unions elected him a member of the World Federation of Trade Unions.

From July 1981 was a member of the Central Committee of the Polish United Workers' Party. From 1981 to 1986 was a member of the Politburo of the Polish United Workers' Party. In the 1980s, he was an opponent and critic of Solidarity movement. From 1986 he was a councilor of the Polish Embassy in Tripoli. Dismissed from his diplomatic position in March 1990 by Foreign Minister Krzysztof Skubiszewski.

After 1990, he was a member of the Social Democracy of the Republic of Poland. He was removed from the party after a conflict with Leszek Miller. Siwak later joined the Catholic nationalist National Party "Fatherland".

Siwak wrote nomerous autobiographic books after retirement, reflecting on his personal journey from mason to diplomat, his political conversion from communist and atheist to nationalist and Catholic, expatiating the socio-political changes in Poland during his lifetime. In 2001, a biopic was released. Towards the end of his life, he aligned with the radical panslavic movement and engaged in bogus archeology. He and his wife had three children.

== Publications ==
- Od łopaty do dyplomaty. Wydawnictwo Projekt, Warszawa 2000. ISBN 83-87168-21-1.
- Rozdarte życie. Wydawnictwo Projekt, Warszawa 2000. ISBN 83-87168-23-8.
- Trwałe ślady. Wydawnictwo Żywe Kamienie, Toruń 2002. ISBN 978-83-913800-2-4.
- Historie niewiarygodnie prawdziwe z zakątka Warmii. Wydawnictwo Regionalista, Olsztyn 2009. ISBN 978-83-927282-3-8
- Bez strachu, tom I, Printed by Europa, 2008.
- Bez strachu, tom II, Warszawa 2009. ISBN 978-83-930071-2-7.
- Bez strachu, tom III, Warszawa 2011. ISBN 978-83-930071-3-4.
- Chciałbym dożyć takich dni, Warszawa 2013. ISBN 978-83-930071-4-1.
- Syndrom gotowanej żaby, Warszawa 2015. ISBN 978-83-930071-1-0.
- Utajniony wyrok, Warszawa 2018. ISBN 978-83-930071-6-5.
