= Zygmunt Załęski =

Polish national movement activist, politician and publicist

Zygmunt Załęski (February 13, 1892 – January 12, 1966 in Warsaw), pseudonym Gnatowski, was a Polish national movement activist, politician and publicist. He was imprisoned during the years of 1950–1953, rehabilitated in 1956.

Załęski was a participant of Silesian Uprisings. He was also a member of Polish People's Party "Wyzwolenie" (Polskie Stronnictwo Ludowe "Wyzwolenie"; since 1918), co-creator and chairman (1928–1929) of Związek Młodzieży Wiejskiej Rzeczypospolitej Polskiej Wici, organiser and chairman of Slavic Union of Village Youth (Słowiański Związek Młodzieży Wiejskiej), managing director of Agriculture Department of Government Delegate's Office at Home (1941–1945), chairman of Society of People's Universities (Towarzystwo Uniwersytetów Ludowych), activist of Polish People's Party (Polskie Stronnictwo Ludowe) and United People's Party (Zjednoczone Stronnictwo Ludowe), deputy of State National Council (Krajowa Rada Narodowa) and Sejm Ustawodawczy (1947–1950), deputy of People's Republic of Poland Seym (1957–1965).
