= Aleksander Zawadzki =

Polish politician

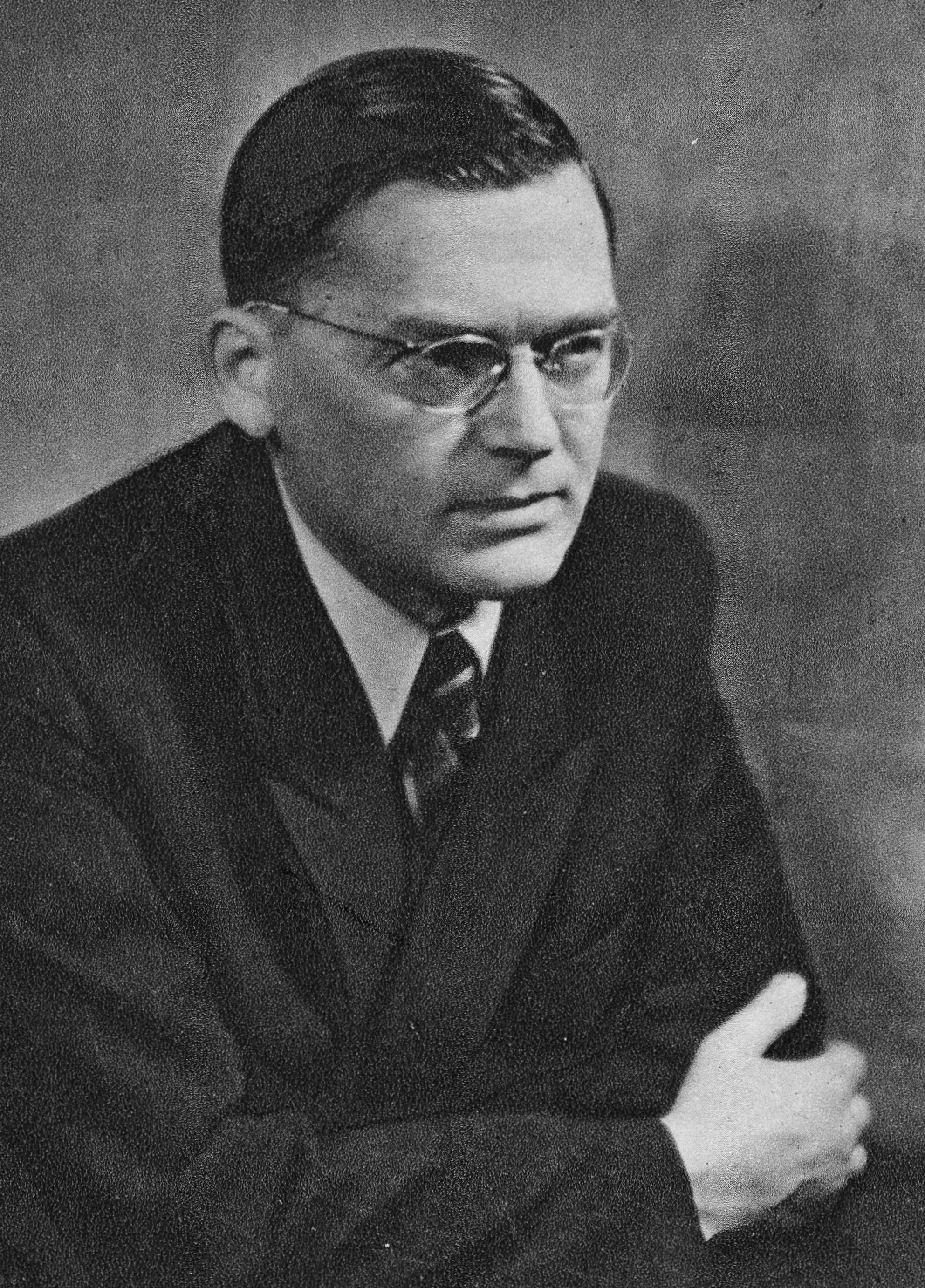
- Zawadzki c. 1950s

1st Chairman of the Council of State of the Polish People's Republic
- In office 20 November 1952 – 7 August 1964
- Prime Minister: Bolesław Bierut; Józef Cyrankiewicz
- First Secretary: Bolesław Bierut; Edward Ochab; Władysław Gomułka
- President in-exile: August Zaleski; Council of Three (1954 onwards)
- Preceded by: Bolesław Bierut (as President of Poland)
- Succeeded by: Edward Ochab

Deputy Prime Minister of the Polish People's Republic
- In office 28 April 1950 – 21 November 1952 Serving with See list: Antoni Korzycki Hilary Minc Hilary Chełchowski
- Prime Minister: Józef Cyrankiewicz
- Preceded by: Hilary Chełchowski
- Succeeded by: Władysław Dworakowski; Piotr Jaroszewicz; Konstanty Rokossowski; Józef Cyrankiewicz
- In office 20 January 1949 – 10 June 1949 Serving with See list: Antoni Korzycki Hilary Minc
- Prime Minister: Józef Cyrankiewicz
- Preceded by: Stanisław Mikołajczyk
- Succeeded by: Hilary Minc

Personal details
- Born: 16 December 1899 Będzin, Piotrków Governorate, Congress Poland
- Died: 7 August 1964 (aged 64) Warsaw, Polish People's Republic
- Party: Communist Party of Poland (1923–1938); Polish United Workers' Party (1948–1964)

Aleksander Zawadzki, alias Kazik, Wacek, Bronek, One (Polish: [alɛˈksandɛr zaˈvat͡skʲi]; 16 December 1899 – 7 August 1964), was a Polish communist politician, divisional general of the Polish Army, and the Chairman of the Council of State of the Polish People's Republic from 1952 until his death in 1964.

== Biography ==
Son of Wawrzyniec, a steelworker and Marianna née Chojkowska. He was born in the Ksawera working group between Będzin and Dąbrowa Górnicza. Thanks to the relatively good material position of the family, he studied at the local elementary school. As a result of an accident suffered by his father in 1913, he was forced to stop his education and take up a job. After the outbreak of World War I, he left for agricultural work in Thuringia. He worked there until 1917, when he was arrested for hitting his overseer and sent to the prisoners of war camp in Erfurt. After escaping from there, he found himself in Upper Silesia, where he worked in a coal mine in Bytom and in the steelworks in Siemianowice Śląskie. After the outbreak of the revolution in November 1918 in Germany, he crossed the German-Polish border and settled in Dąbrowa Górnicza, where in December 1918 he volunteered for the Polish Army. He took part in the battles in defense of Lviv, and then in war activities on the Lithuanian-Belarusian Front of the Polish-Bolshevik war. In 1921, he was demobilized as a non-commissioned officer of the Polish Army, after which he returned to Dąbrowa Górnicza. For participating in the fighting in 1920, he was awarded the Cross of Valor.

After returning from the war, he was initially unemployed, and then he worked at the coal mine "Paris" in Dąbrowa Górnicza. There, he also encountered the communist movement and joined the Young Communist League of Poland. In 1923, he became a member of the Communist Party of Poland. During this period, he was wanted by state police for communist activities. He operated in the Łódź District until 1924, after which he was sent to a party school in Moscow, where he stayed for several weeks. On 9 July 1925, he was arrested in Vilnius on charges of involvement in the murder of a supposed police informant. In December 1925, despite the lack of evidence for his involvement, he was sentenced to six years in prison. He served his sentence in Kielce, Łomża and Drohobych. He left prison on 2 March 1932, and because of illness, was sent to the Soviet Union for treatment. There, he healed and taught at the party school of the WKP (b) and the OGPU near Moscow.

He returned to Poland in 1934. On 27 May 1934, he was arrested in Warsaw. He was detained in custody until February 1935, when he was released on bail. On 13 January 1936, he was arrested again. He was then accused of acting to the detriment of the Republic of Poland. The trial took place on 4–21 April 1938. Along with Zawadzki, who was the main accused, 55 other people were tried. Zawadzki was sentenced to 15 years' imprisonment. After upholding the judgment of 23 November 1938 by the Court of Appeals, he was imprisoned in Brest. He stayed there until September 1939, when, after the Soviet invasion of Poland, the city was occupied by the Red Army. He took up work in the Byelorussian Soviet Socialist Republic in the Pinsk district office.

During World War II, he was active in the foundation of the Union of Polish Patriots and the Polish Workers' Party, being elected to the Politburo of the latter. He was also a political organiser of the Polish Army in the Soviet Union and was promoted to the rank of brigadier general.

After the war, he became the government representative in Silesia, then the voivode of the Silesian-Dąbrowskie Voivodeship. From December 1948, he became a member of the Politburo of the Central Committee of the Polish United Workers' Party. From 1949 to 1952 he was deputy chairman of the Council of Ministers.

Zawadzki was elected to the Sejm in 1947, and on 20 November 1952, he was appointed chairman of the Council of State of the Polish People's Republic, to replace Bolesław Bierut.

Zawadzki died on 7 August 1964 of cancer at the age of 64 and was buried at the Powązki Military Cemetery in Warsaw.

== Honours and awards ==
=== National honours ===
- Order of the Builders of People's Poland
- Grand Cross of the Order of Polonia Restituta
- Order of the Banner of Labour, 1st Class
- Order of the Cross of Grunwald, 2nd Class
- Knight's Cross of the Virtuti Militari
- Cross of Valour
- Partisan Cross (12 June 1946)
- Silesian Uprising Cross
- Medal for Warsaw 1939–1945
- Medal of Victory and Freedom 1945
- Medal of the 10th Anniversary of People's Poland
- Badge of the 1000th Anniversary of the Polish State

=== Foreign honours ===
- Gold Star of Military Order of the White Lion, 1st Class (1949) (Czechoslovakia)
- Knight Grand Cross of Royal Order of Cambodia (1956)
- Order of the National Flag, 1st Class (1959) (North Korea)
- Grand Cross of Order of the White Rose of Finland with Collar (1960)
- Star of the Republic of Indonesia, 1st Class (1961)
- Grand Collar of Order of the Southern Cross (1962) (Brazil)
- Collar of Order of the Aztec Eagle (1963) (Mexico)
- Order of the Yugoslav Great Star (1964)
- Medal "For the Victory over Germany in the Great Patriotic War 1941–1945" (Soviet Union)

Political offices
Preceded by Bolesław Bierut (as President of Poland)	Chairman of the Polish Council of State; 20 November 1952 – 7 August 1964	Succeeded by Edward Ochab
