= Zenon Kliszko =

Polish politician (1908–1989)

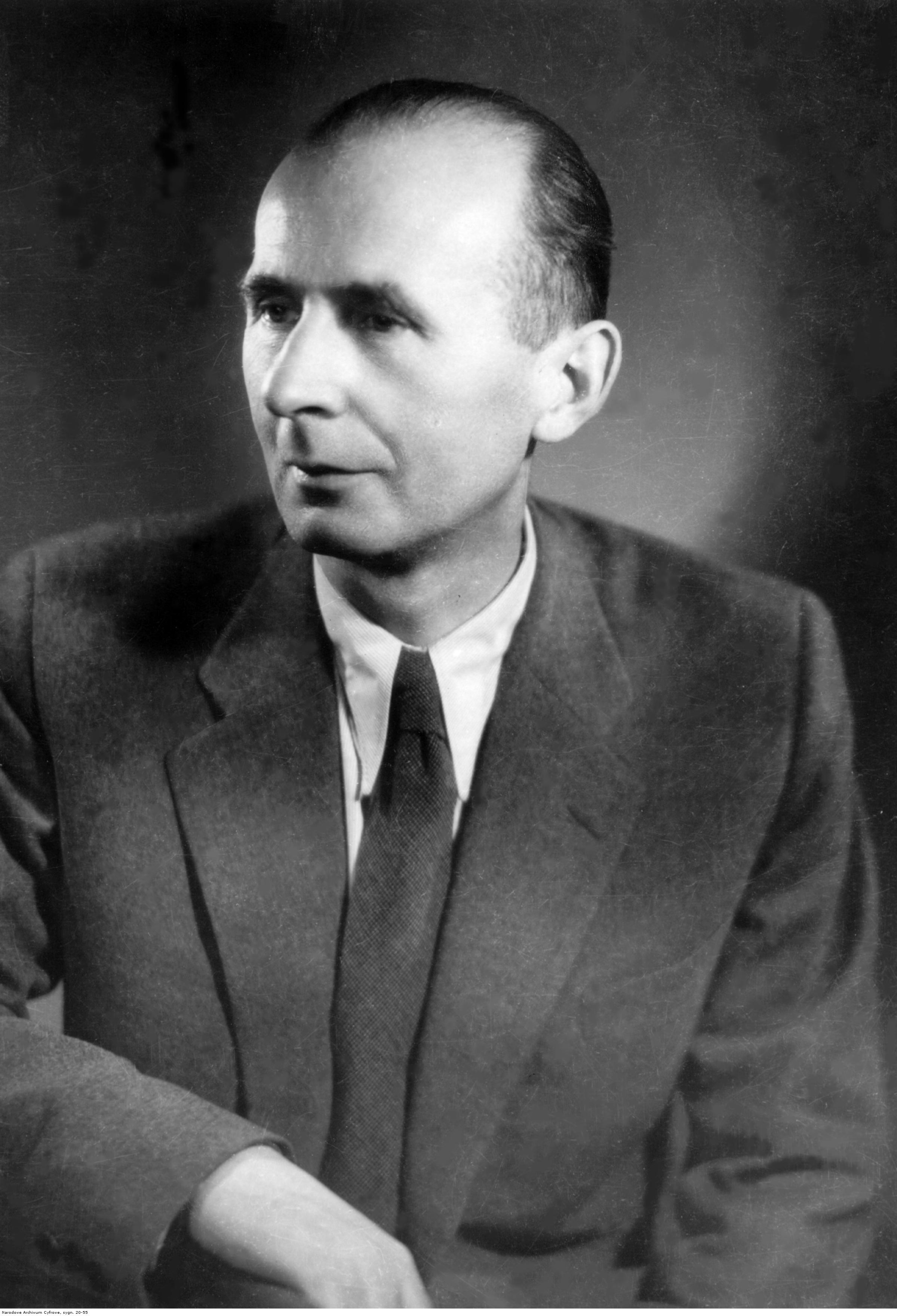

Member of the Politburo of the Polish United Workers' Party
- In office 1959–1970

Deputy Marshal of the Sejm
- In office 20 February 1957 – 13 February 1971

Personal details
- Born: 8 December 1908 Łódź, Congress Poland
- Died: 4 September 1989 (aged 80) Warsaw, Poland
- Party: Polish United Workers' Party
- Education: Warsaw University

Zenon Kliszko (8 December 1908 – 4 September 1989) was a politician in the Polish People's Republic, considered the right-hand man of Polish United Workers' Party (PZPR) leader Władysław Gomułka. He was born in Łódź and died in Warsaw.

== Biography ==
Kliszko graduated from Warsaw University and joined the Communist Party of Poland in 1931. He was arrested in 1934 for anti-state agitation and released after the courts established that he was mentally challenged. Kliszko took part in the Warsaw Uprising during Nazi Germany's occupation of Poland and escaped capture by swimming across the Vistula river. He met Gomułka in Lublin, befriended him, and became the KC PZPR functionary after the Soviet takeover in 1945.

On Kliszko's advice and recommendation, the communist party took down the production of Dziady by Mickiewicz at the Polish Theatre in Warsaw, leading to the 1968 Polish political crisis and student protests across the country, brutally suppressed by ORMO, as well as the expulsion from Poland of thousands of individuals of Jewish ancestry.

Kliszko was responsible for issuing an order to regular army units under General Bolesław Chocha to open fire on striking workers in Gdańsk and Gdynia during the Polish 1970 protests. The protests would lead to Gomułka's resignation in December 1970; shortly thereafter, Kliszko was fired from his position and removed from the PZPR by Edward Gierek.

== Awards and decorations ==
- Order of the Builders of People's Poland (1964)
- Order of the Banner of Labour (1959)
- Order of the Cross of Grunwald, 2nd Class (1959)
- Silver Cross of Virtuti Militari
- Medal for Warsaw 1939–1945 (17 January 1946)
- Medal of Ludwik Waryński (1986)
- Badge of the 1000th Anniversary of the Polish State (1963)
- Grand Officer of Order of Merit of the Italian Republic (Italy, 1965)
- Order of the People's Republic of Bulgaria, 1st Class (Bulgaria, 1967)
- Jubilee Medal "In Commemoration of the 100th Anniversary of the Birth of Vladimir Ilyich Lenin" (USSR, 1969))
