= Central Committee of the Polish United Workers' Party =

Central ruling body of the 1948–1990 Polish ruling party

- Komitet Centralny Polskiej Zjednoczonej Partii Robotniczej

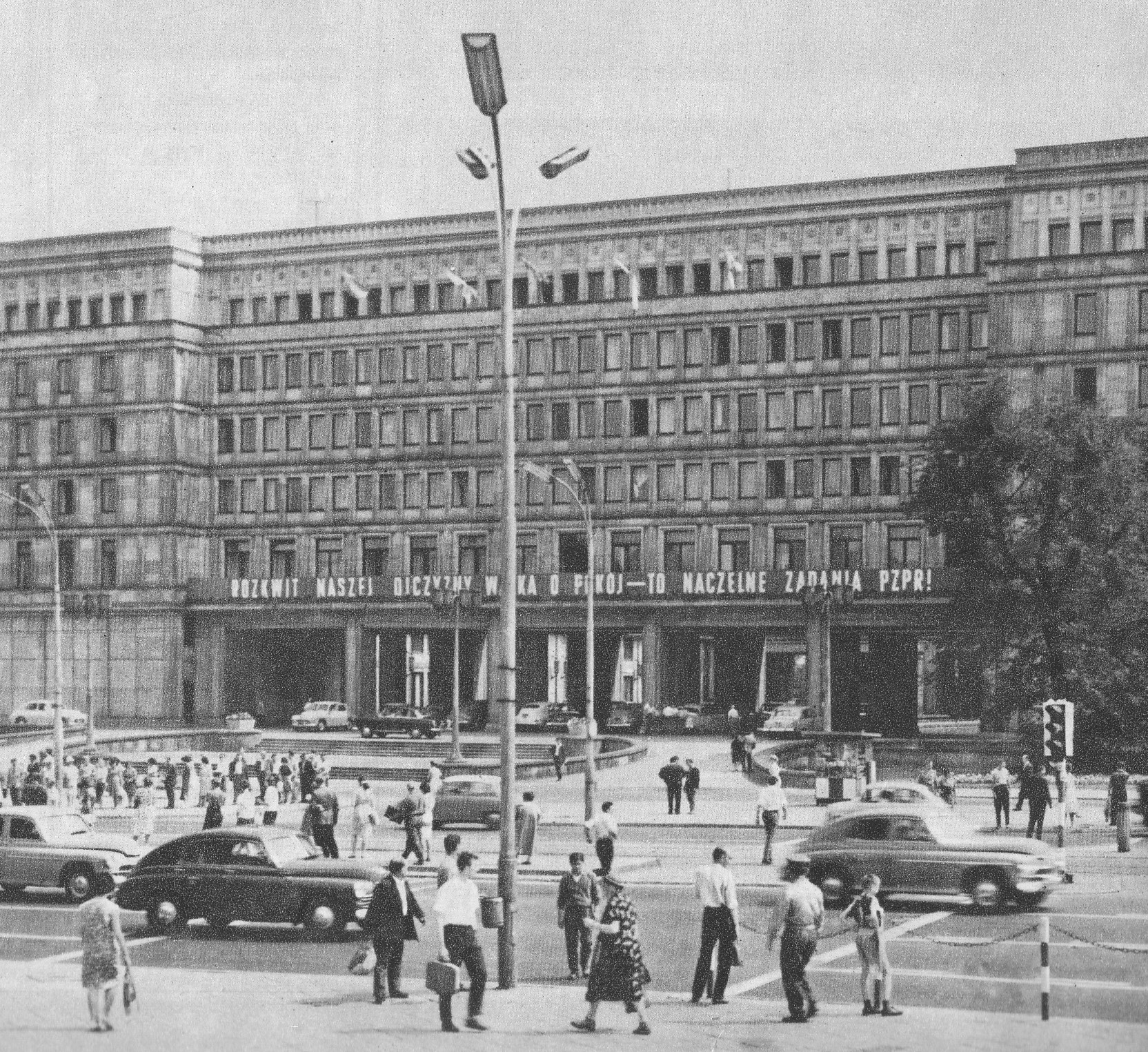
- Former headquarters of the Central Committee in Warsaw
- Abbreviation: KC PZPR
- Established: 1948
- Dissolved: 1990
- Headquarters: New World Street
- Location: Warsaw
- Main organ: Życie Partii
- Parent organization: PZPR
- Staff: 1297 (1977)

Central Committee of the Polish United Workers' Party (Polish: Komitet Centralny Polskiej Zjednoczonej Partii Robotniczej, KC PZPR) was the highest organ of the Polish United Workers' Party, the dominant political party in the People's Republic of Poland (1948-1990), which existed when congress is not in session.

== Functions ==
Members of the Committee convened about every four months. The Committee elected representatives to various bodies, among which the most important was the Politburo of the Polish United Workers' Party, which took actions between the conventions.

== Leaders ==
By the year 1954 the head of the party was the Chair of the Central Committee. They de facto replaced the abolished position of the President of Poland:

- Secretary General Bolesław Bierut (December 22, 1948 – March 12, 1956)
- First Secretary Edward Ochab (March 20, 1956 – October 21, 1956)
- First Secretary Władysław Gomułka (October 21, 1956 - December 20, 1970)
- First Secretary Edward Gierek (December 20, 1970 – September 6, 1980)
- First Secretary Stanisław Kania (September 6, 1980 – October 18, 1981)
- First Secretary Wojciech Jaruzelski (October 18, 1981 – July 29, 1989)
- First Secretary Mieczysław Rakowski (July 29, 1989 – January 29, 1990)

== Seat ==
By 1990 the decision-making center was situated in a building erected by obligatory subscription in the years 1948–1952. The shares, called ″little bricks" (in Polish "cegiełka") with nominal values of 50-, 100-, and 500 zlotys, were distributed among the entire society. The building was officially called the Party's House, and was also known as the White House or the House of Sheep. Since 1991 the Bank-Financial Center "New World" is located in this building. In 1991-2000 the Warsaw Stock Exchange had also its seat in this building.

From 1918 to 1931 a building with the seat of communication department was located in that place. Earlier – from the November Uprising to 1918 – there was also the seat of the Clearing-House.

== See also ==
- Central committee
- Democratic centralism
