= Order of the Builders of People's Poland =

Order of the Builders of People's Poland Order Budowniczych Polski Ludowej
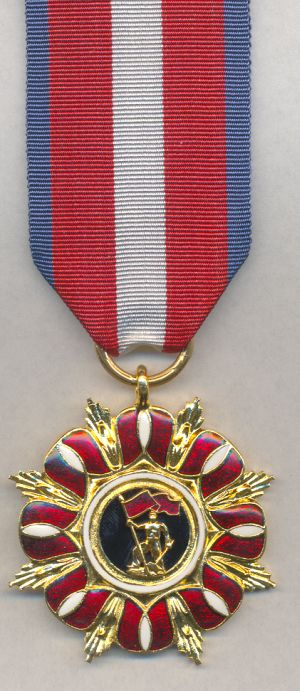
- Order of the Builders of People's Poland
- Type: State order
- Awarded for: "unique achievements in the task of building People's Poland"
- Presented by: the People's Republic of Poland
- Status: No longer awarded
- Established: 2 July 1949

Highlights
- Total recipients: 310 individuals 10 institutions
- Ribbon bar (1949–1960) Ribbon bar (1960–1990)

Precedence
- Next (higher): None
- Next (lower): Polonia Restituta

Order of the Builders of People's Poland (Polish: Order Budowniczych Polski Ludowej) was the highest civil decoration of Poland in the times of the People's Republic of Poland.

== History ==
The order was established by the Sejm on 2 July 1949 for "awarding unique achievements in the task of building People's Poland". It was designed by Michał Bylina and Wojciech Jastrzębski.

Unofficially, it replaced Poland's highest pre-war order, the Order of the White Eagle (the Order of the White Eagle was never officially disestablished, but it was not awarded in People's Poland).

The order was awarded by the president of Poland until the office was abolished in 1952; from then it was awarded by the Polish Council of State. It had only one class. A person decorated with the order had the title of a Builder of People's Poland (Budowniczy Polski Ludowej).

The order was awarded to many udarniks (supposedly high productivity workers), notable party members (including military personnel) and others.

The Order was last awarded on June 27th, 1993 (though formally abolished on October 16th, 1992 by the Sejm). Up to that time, about 310 individuals were awarded the Order, and 10 institutions (ex. Society of Fighters for Freedom and Democracy) and territorial units (cities and administrative entities - voivodeships, for instance). During the times of the People's Republic, 7 recipients had their orders revoked. It was officially disestablished 2 years after the People's Republic was replaced by the Third Republic

== Eligibility criteria ==
The order could be awarded to Polish individuals, enterprises, and institutions that performed exceptional deeds in the fields of:

- national economy, in particular through inventions, improving work organizations, and work inspiration and efficiency (see udarnik)
- education, science, culture and art
- national defense
- health and sport
- public service

== Description ==
The Order has a golden rosette, 53 mm in diameter. The rosette has eight petals enameled with white (inner) and red (outer). Petals are separated by gold rays. In the center is a white-encircled blue medallion, which depicts a gold male figure carrying a hammer and a red banner. The reverse has a red enameled medallion with, in gold, the letters PRL, standing for Polska Rzeczpospolita Ludowa - People's Republic of Poland (orders awarded before the state's name changed in 1952 have the letters RP for Rzeczpospolita Polska).

The ribbon is 40 mm wide and is red-white-red with blue edges.
