= Knyszyn Forest Landscape Park =

Protected forest area in Poland

- Polish: Park Krajobrazowy Puszczy Knyszyńskiej
- IUCN category V (protected landscape/seascape)
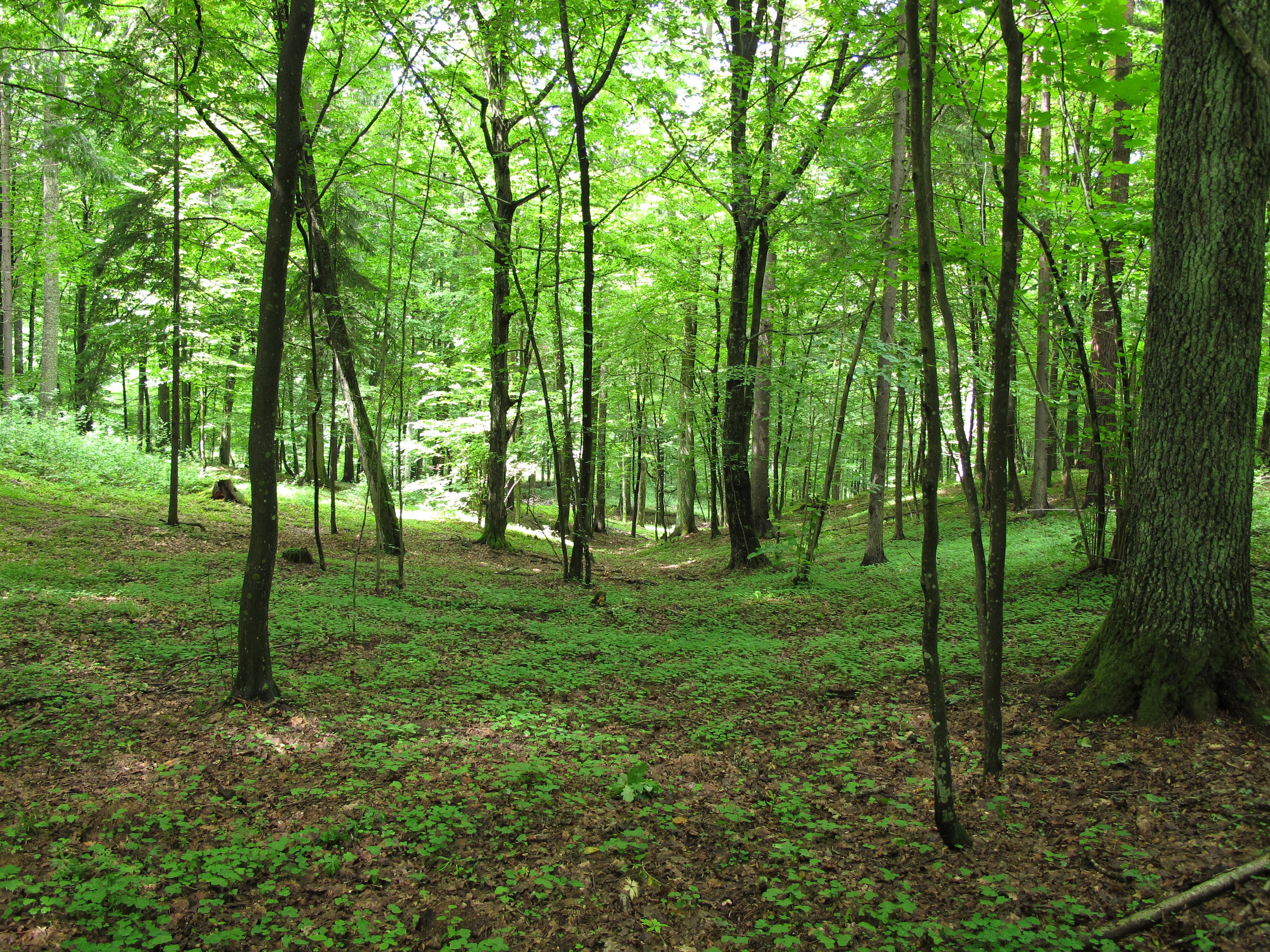
- The Góry Czumażowskie Hills in the Knyszyn Forest near Ożynnik Park logo

- Location within Poland
- Location: Podlaskie Voivodeship, Poland
- Nearest city: Supraśl
- Coordinates: 53°14′00″N 23°23′00″E
- Area: 744.47 km^{2} (287.44 sq mi)
- Established: 1988
- Governing body: Ministry of the Environment
- Website: www.pkpk.pl

Knyszyn Forest Landscape Park, also known as Puszcza Knyszyńska Landscape Park (Park Krajobrazowy Puszczy Knyszyńskiej) is a protected area (landscape park) in Knyszyn Forest which is located Podlaskie Voivodeship of northeastern Poland.

== Geography ==
It protects an area of 744.47 square kilometres (287.44 sq mi).

It was established in 1988, and is a Natura 2000 EU Special Protection Area.

The landscape park contains 20 nature reserves.

=== Counties and Gminas ===
The natural Landscape Park is within Podlaskie Voivodeship, and is located in:

- Białystok County (in Gmina Czarna Białostocka, Gmina Gródek, Gmina Michałowo, Gmina Supraśl, and Gmina Wasilków)
- Mońki County (in Gmina Knyszyn)
- Sokółka County (in Gmina Sokółka, Gmina Janów, Gmina Krynki, and Gmina Szudziałowo)

== See also ==
- Landscape parks in Poland
- Special Protection Areas in Poland
- Natura 2000 in Poland
