= Tadeusz Szelachowski =

Polish politician (1932–2020)

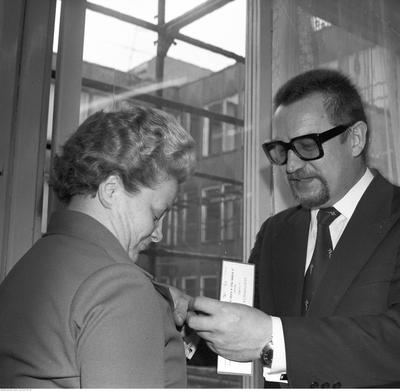
- Szelachowski as Minister of Health decorates with a badge "For exemplary work in the health service", April 7, 1982

Vice Chairman of the Polish Council of State
- In office 6 November 1985 – 19 June 1989

Minister of Health
- In office 12 February 1981 – 12 November 1985
- Prime Minister: Wojciech Jaruzelski
- Preceded by: Marian Śliwiński
- Succeeded by: Mirosław Cybulko

Personal details
- Born: 7 April 1932 (age 94) Sielachowskie, Second Polish Republic
- Died: 9 September 2020 (aged 88) Warsaw, Poland
- Resting place: Sw. Rocha Cemetery in Białystok
- Party: United People's Party
- Education: Medical Academy in Białystok
- Occupation: Physician, politician

Tadeusz Szelachowski (7 April 1932 – 9 September 2020) was a Polish politician who served as Minister of Health and Social Security.

== Biography ==
Son of Konstanty and Eugenia. In 1955, he graduated from the Medical Academy in Białystok. In the years 1949–1956 he was a member of the Union of Polish Youth. From 1957 he was a member of the United People's Party, a member of the party's leadership (in 1980–1989 a member of the Supreme Committee, in 1983–1989 a member of the Presidium of the NK, in 1988–1989 vice-president and member of the NK Secretariat, and in 1985–1989 chairman of the Deputies' Club ZSL in the Sejm of the 9th term).

From 1956, an employee of the health service administration, in the years 1956–1963 and 1969–1973 head of the Health and Social Welfare Department of the Presidium of the District National Council in Białystok, in the years 1963–1969 deputy head, and in the years 1973–1977 head of the corresponding department of the Presidium of the Voivodeship National Council in Białystok (from 1976 Provincial Office); in the years 1975–1977, provincial doctor in Białystok.

In the years 1977–1981, undersecretary of state at the Ministry of Health and Social Welfare, in the years 1980–1981, after the dismissal of Marian Śliwiński he was the minister of Health, in the years 1981–1985. From 1985 to 1989 he was deputy chairman of the Council of State and member of the Sejm of the Polish People's Republic of the 9th term. He unsuccessfully ran for re-election.

In the years 1983–1988, member of the presidium of the Citizens' Council for the construction of the Motherhood monument for the hospital of the Polish Mother's Health Center. In the years 1986–1988, a member of the presidium of the Social Committee for the Renewal of the Old Town of Zamość.

He died after a long illness on 9 September 2020 and was buried on 14 September 2020 at the cemetery of St. Roch in Białystok.
