= Klimaszewski =

Klimaszewski may refer to:

- Andrzej Klimaszewski (canoeist) (born 1954), Polish sprint canoer
- Andrzej Klimaszewski (athlete) (born 1960), Polish long jumper
- Mieczysław Klimaszewski (1908–1995), Polish geographer
- Jerzy Klimaszewski (1903–1945), Polish actor
- The Klimaszewski Twins, Elaine and Diane, also known as the Coors Light Twins
