= Zaścianek (disambiguation) =

Zaścianek was a type of settlement in the history of Poland and Grand Duchy of Lithuania.

Zaścianek may also refer to:

- Zaścianek, Podlaskie Voivodeship
- Zaścianek, Warmian-Masurian Voivodeship
