= Jerzy Ziętek =

Polish politician and general (1901–1985)

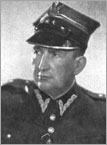
- Lieutenant colonel Jerzy Ziętek
- Born: 10 June 1901; Szobiszowice, German Empire
- Died: 20 November 1985 (aged 84); Zabrze, Polish People's Republic
- Military career
- Allegiance: Poland
- Branch: Polish People's Army
- Service years: 1943-1985
- Rank: Generał brygady (Brigadier general)
- Nickname: Jorg
- Commands: Deputy commander of the 3rd Pomeranian Infantry Division
- Awards
- Other work: Voivode of Silesia; Voivode of Katowice Voivodeship; Member of the State Council

Jerzy Jan Antoni Ziętek (10 June 1901 in Gleiwitz – 20 November 1985 in Katowice, Upper Silesia) was a Polish politician and general. A Silesian Insurrectionist in his youth, during the Second World War he joined the Polish armed forces in the USSR and later became an important politician representing Silesia in the People's Republic of Poland.

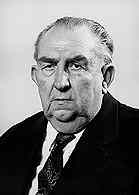
Jerzy Ziętek.

== Biography ==
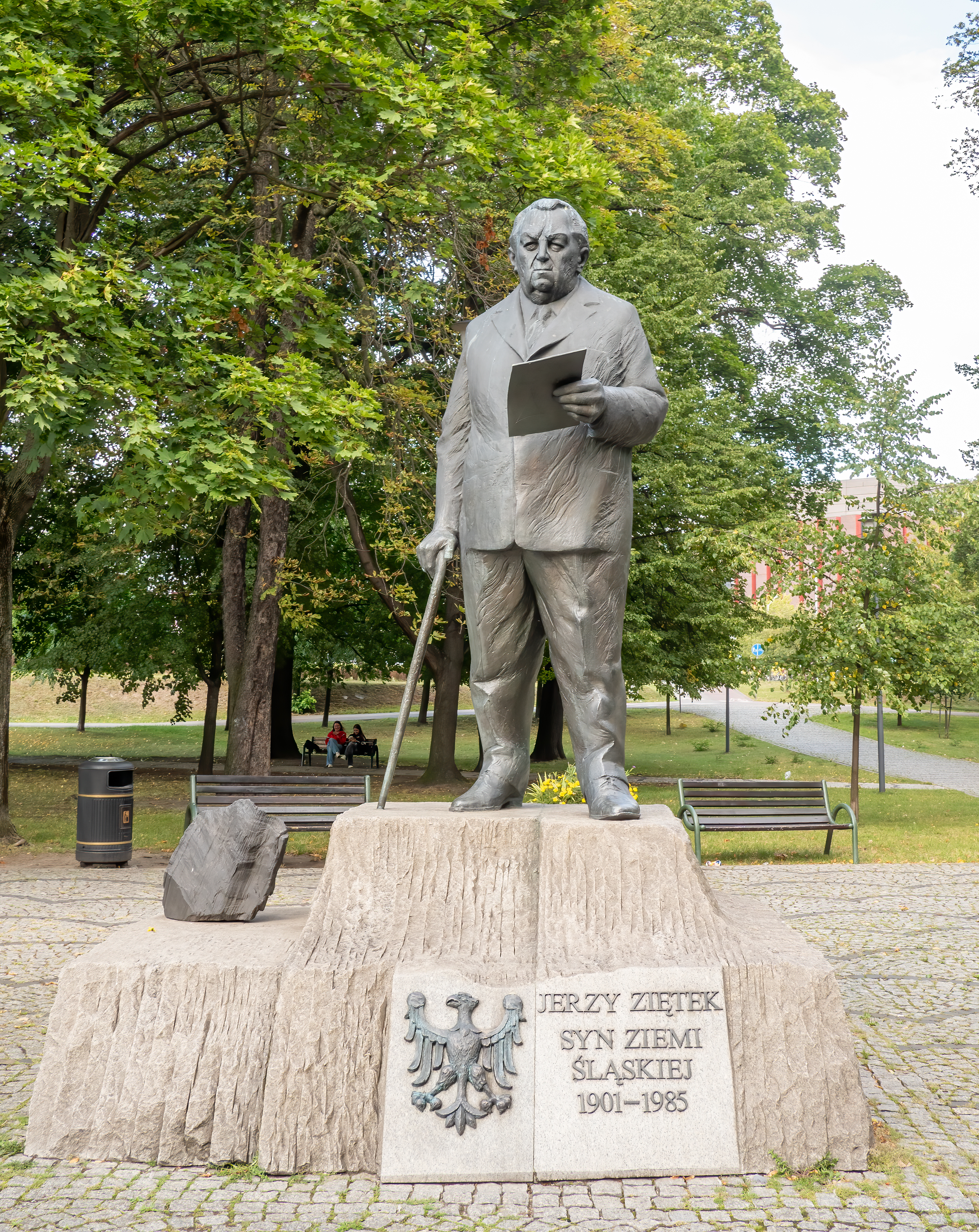
Statue of Ziętek in Katowice

Jerzy Ziętek was born in the city of Gleiwitz, Prussia (Upper Silesia), in the German Empire. He was active in various Polish cultural movements, for which he was discharged from gymnasium in 1919 and passed his matura exams in front of the provisional Polish commission in Bytom.

Ziętek was the advocate of Silesian independence and in the aftermath of the First World War he participated actively in the Silesian Uprisings (1919-1921) against the Germans. In 1920 he was introduced to Polish Military Organization. In the third Silesian Uprising (1921), he battled in the 8th Company of the 3rd Gliwice battalion. At first, he was commander of a platoon, and later of the entire company. On more occasions he was involved in direct fighting, in Łabędy, Stare Koźle, Januszkowice and Sławięcice. He was also involved in organizing the plebiscite in Silesia, under the guidance of the League of Nations, which eventually determined to award most of Silesia to the Second Polish Republic.

Nonetheless Ziętek in his memoirs was disappointed with the results of the peace agreement that was pushed through by the British: "Everywhere, our struggle for freedom was met with disdain, especially by British politicians. Lloyd George was the most infamous of them all, having said that you can not give a watch to a monkey because the animal will break it, implying that the watch was Silesia and the monkey Poland"

From 1922 until 1939 he was a mayor of Radzionków and took part in the autonomous government of Silesia and from 1930 to 1935 he was a deputy for the Polish parliament (Sejm) from the Nonpartisan Bloc for Cooperation with the Government (BBWR) party.

In 1939, after the Germans invaded Poland he fled the Nazis and found himself in the Polish areas annexed by the Soviet Union, (which joined the Germans in their invasion). In the Soviet Union he decided to cooperate with the Polish nationalists. In 1943 he enrolled in the Union of Polish Nationalists and joined the Polish Army, where he had the rank of pułkownik (colonel) and was the vice-commander of the Polish 3rd Infantry Division. In 1945 he became a member of the communist controlled Polish Workers Party (PPR), which later became the Polish United Workers' Party (PZPR).

In his political career, which lasted from 1945 until 1985, he occupied a number of different positions. First as the vice-voivod of the Silesian-Dąbrowa Voivodeship, from 1950 its first representative and from 1964 the leader of the voivodeship sejmik. In 1973 he became the voivod himself until 1975. He was also a representative in the Polish Sejm from 1947 until 1952 and from 1957 until 1985. From 1961 to 1969 he was the chairman of the Sejm Commission of Building and Communal Economy. From 1963 to 1980 he was a member of the Polish Council of State and from 1980 to 1985 one of its four deputy chairmen.

From 1949 until the end of his life he was the vice-president of Society of Fighters for Freedom. In 1959 the People's Republic of Poland awarded him the Order of the Builders of People's Poland. In 1971, at the 30th anniversary of the Third Silesian Uprising, he was also promoted to the rank of generał brygady. In 1977 he received honorary PhD diploma from Silesian University

In 1946 he wrote his memoirs about the times of Silesian Uprisings: "Powstańczy Szlak – rozważania powstańcze" (Insurgence trail - thoughts on uprising). His life was also the basis of the 1979 movie by Antoni Halor: Man with the cane (Człowiek z laską).

He was responsible for creation of the Silesian Park, Silesian Stadium, Katowice Rondo and many other buildings important for the region. There are monuments to him in the Park as well as on the Katowice Rondo (which is named after him). He is also the patron of Silesian School of Management in Katowice. The Gazeta Wyborcza named him as the second-most important Silesian person in the 20th century, coming second to Wojciech Korfanty and before director Kazimierz Kutz. He died on November 20, 1985, in Katowice.

== Awards and decorations ==
- Order of the Builders of People's Poland (1959)
- Order of the Banner of Labour, 1st Class
- Commander's Cross with Star of the Order of Polonia Restituta
- Order of the Cross of Grunwald, 3rd Class (24 April 1946)
- Officer's Cross of the Order of Polonia Restituta (22 July 1953)
- Knight's Cross of the Order of Polonia Restituta
- Silver Cross of Virtuti Militari
- Golden Cross of Merit (18 January 1946)
- Silesian Uprising Cross (1947)
- Silver Cross of Merit
- Bronze Cross of Merit (19 January 1928)
- Cross on the Silesian Ribbon of Valor and Merit, 1st Class
- Medal of the 30th Anniversary of People's Poland (1974)
- Medal of the 40th Anniversary of People's Poland
- Rodło Medal (posthumously, 1985)
- Medal of the 10th Anniversary of People's Poland (1954)
- Golden Medal of Merit for National Defence
- Silver Medal of Merit for National Defence
- Bronze Medal of Merit for National Defence
- Medal of the National Education Commission (1973)
- Golden Janek Krasicki Decoration
- Badge of the 1000th Anniversary of the Polish State (1966)
- Chevalier of Ordre national du Mérite (France, 1967)
- Order of the Red Banner (Czechoslovakia)
- Order of the Red Banner of Labour (USSR, 1968)
