= Edward Babiuch =

Polish politician (1927–2021)

Prime Minister of Poland
- In office 18 February 1980 – 24 August 1980 Serving with Kazimierz Sabbat (in-exile)
- Chairman: Henryk Jabłoński
- First Secretary: Edward Gierek
- Preceded by: Piotr Jaroszewicz
- Succeeded by: Józef Pińkowski

Personal details
- Born: 28 December 1927 Grabocin, Kielce Voivodeship, Poland
- Died: 1 February 2021 (aged 93)
- Party: Polish United Workers' Party

Edward Mikołaj Babiuch (['edvard ˈbabʲux]; 28 December 1927 – 1 February 2021) was a Polish Communist political figure. He was one of four deputy chairmen of the Polish Council of State 1976–1980. Babiuch served as the 34th Prime Minister of Poland from 18 February to 24 August 1980.

== Biography ==
Son of Mikołaj and Bronisława. In the years 1953–1955, he was a student at the Party School at the Central Committee of the Polish United Workers' Party. He studied at the Main School of Planning and Statistics in Warsaw.

Since 1948, a member of the Polish Workers' Party and then the Polish United Workers' Party. In the years 1949–1955, he worked in the Union of Polish Youth, then in the Central Committee of the Polish United Workers' Party (from 1955 to 1959, he was an instructor in the Organizational Department, including a senior instructor from 1958). In the years 1959–1963, secretary of the Warsaw Voivodeship Committee of the Polish United Workers' Party and head of the Organizational Department of this committee. Member of the Central Committee since 1964. In the years 1963–1965, he was a deputy head of the Organizational Department of the Central Committee, editor-in-chief of the newspaper "Życie Partii" (Party Life). In the years 1965–1970, head of the Organizational Department of the Central Committee. From December 1970, a member of the Political Bureau of the Central Committee (until August 1980) and secretary of the Central Committee (until February 1980).

In the years 1972–1976, a member, and in the years 1976–1980, deputy chairman of the Council of State. From February to August 1980, Prime Minister of Poland. From 1969, he held a mandate in the Sejm of the Polish People's Republic of the 5th, 6th, 7th and 8th term. In the Sejm, he was chairman of the National Defense Committee (1971–1972) and chairman of the PZPR MPs' Club (1972–1980). In the years 1971–1981, he was also a member of the presidium of the National Committee of the National Unity Front.

As a close associate of Edward Gierek, he was forced to resign from state and party positions in August 1980, dismissed from the Central Committee in October 1980, and expelled from the party by the 9th Congress of the Polish United Workers' Party in July 1981. At the call of the Central Committee plenum in December 1980, he also resigned from his parliamentary mandate. In July 1981, he was stripped of his two highest state decorations, the Order of the Builders of People's Poland and the Order of the Banner of Labour, 1st Class, by the State Council of the Polish People's Republic. From December 1981 to December 1982, during martial law, he was interned.

He died in February 2021 at the age of 93. He was the longest-lived former Polish prime minister, improving on the record of Adam Jerzy Czartoryski.

Political offices
Preceded by Piotr Jaroszewicz	Prime Minister of Poland; 1980	Succeeded by Józef Pińkowski
