= Jan Dembowski (biologist) =

Polish biologist and academic (1889–1963)

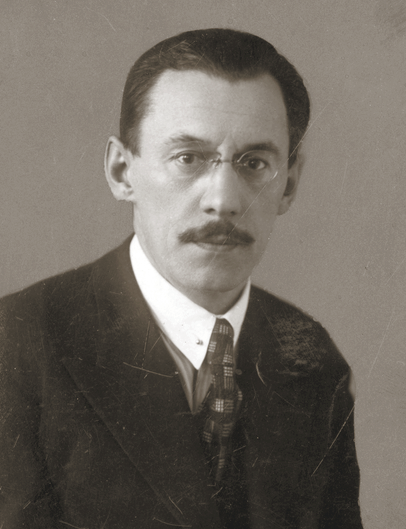
- Jan Bohdan Dembowski, before 1936

Vice chairman of the Polish State Council
- In office 22 November 1952 – 20 February 1957

Marshal of the Sejm of the Polish People's Republic
- In office 20 November 1952 – 20 November 1956
- Preceded by: Władysław Kowalski
- Succeeded by: Czesław Wycech

Personal details
- Born: 26 December 1889 Saint Petersburg, Russian Empire
- Died: 22 September 1963 (aged 73) Warsaw, Polish People's Republic
- Resting place: Powązki Military Cemetery
- Party: Front of National Unity

Jan Bohdan Dembowski (Polish pronunciation: [jan dɛmˈbɔf.ski]; 26 December 1889 – 22 September 1963) was a Polish biologist and academic who was the first President of the Polish Academy of Sciences.

== Biography ==
Dembowski was born in Saint Petersburg, Russian Empire and studied in the Saint Petersburg and Vienna universities.

From 1919 to 1934 a researcher at the Nencki Institute of Experimental Biology of the Polish Academy of Sciences in Warsaw. From 1920 to 1930 a professor at the Free Polish University and from 1922 to 1934 he was an associate professor at the University of Warsaw. He was a professor at the Vilnius University and after the Soviet annexation of Lithuania he became a lecturer at the University of Marxism-Leninism in Vilnius.

In years 1929–1939 he was the editor-in-chief of popular-science journal Wszechświat.

During World War II he became involved in the Polish Union of Patriots. He became the first president of the Polish Academy of Sciences (1952–1956), marshal of the Sejm (1952–1957) and Deputy Chairman of the Polish Council of State (1952–1957).

In the years 1948–1952 chairman of the Polish Committee of the Defenders of Peace. In November 1949 he became a member of the National Committee for the Celebration of the 70th anniversary of the birth of Joseph Stalin. In 1951–1953 chairman of the State Awards Committee, in 1952–1956 deputy chairman of the National Committee of the National Front. On 6 March 1953 he joined the National Committee to Commemorate Joseph Stalin.

Dembowski was a member of the Circle of Marxist Naturalists and was a leading figure for the promotion of Lysenkoism in Poland.

He was awarded the Order of the Builders of Polish People's Republic and also received the Commander's Cross with Star of the Order of Polonia Restituta. In 1949 and 1955 state winner of the first degree, a member of the Academy of Sciences and foreign - USSR Academy of Sciences (honorary member), the Hungarian Academy of Sciences, Academy of Sciences in New York.

Jan Dembowski died, aged 73, in Warsaw, he received a state funeral and was buried at the Powązki Military Cemetery.
