= Jurowce, Podlaskie Voivodeship =

Jurowce
- Village
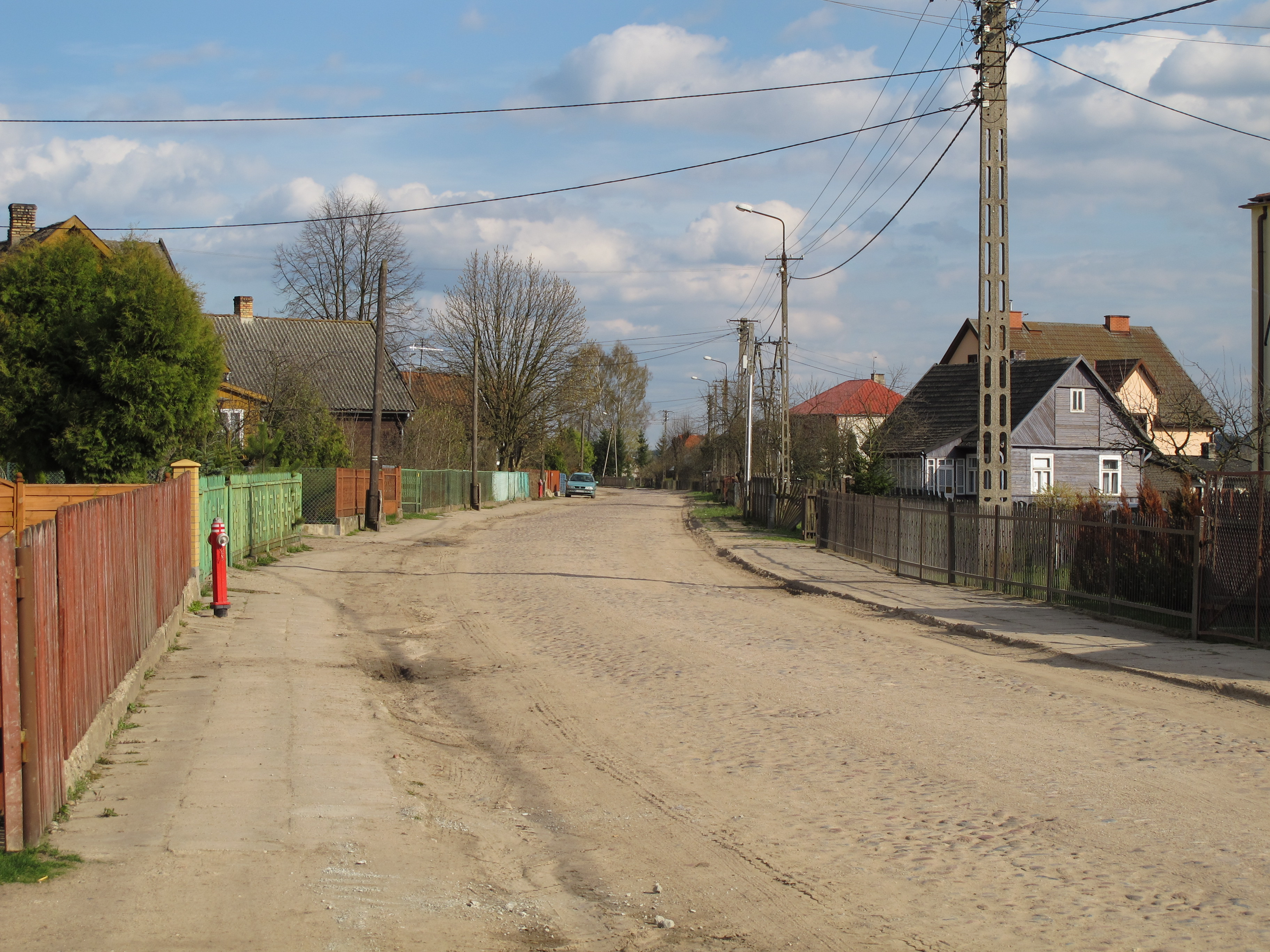

- Location within Poland
- Coordinates: 53°11′52″N 23°9′17″E
- Country: Poland
- Voivodeship: Podlaskie
- County: Białystok
- Gmina: Wasilków
- Population (approx.): 500

Jurowce [juˈrɔft͡sɛ] is a village in the administrative district of Gmina Wasilków, within Białystok County, Podlaskie Voivodeship, in north-eastern Poland.
