= Katrynka-Leśniczówka =

- Village
- Location within Poland
- Coordinates: 53°11′15″N 23°09′45″E
- Country: Poland
- Voivodeship: Podlaskie
- County: Białystok
- Gmina: Wasilków

Katrynka-Leśniczówka (Polish pronunciation: [kaˈtrɨŋka lɛɕɲiˈtʂufka]) is a village in the administrative district of Gmina Wasilków, within Białystok County, Podlaskie Voivodeship, in north-eastern Poland.
