= Studzianki, Podlaskie Voivodeship =

Studzianki
- Village
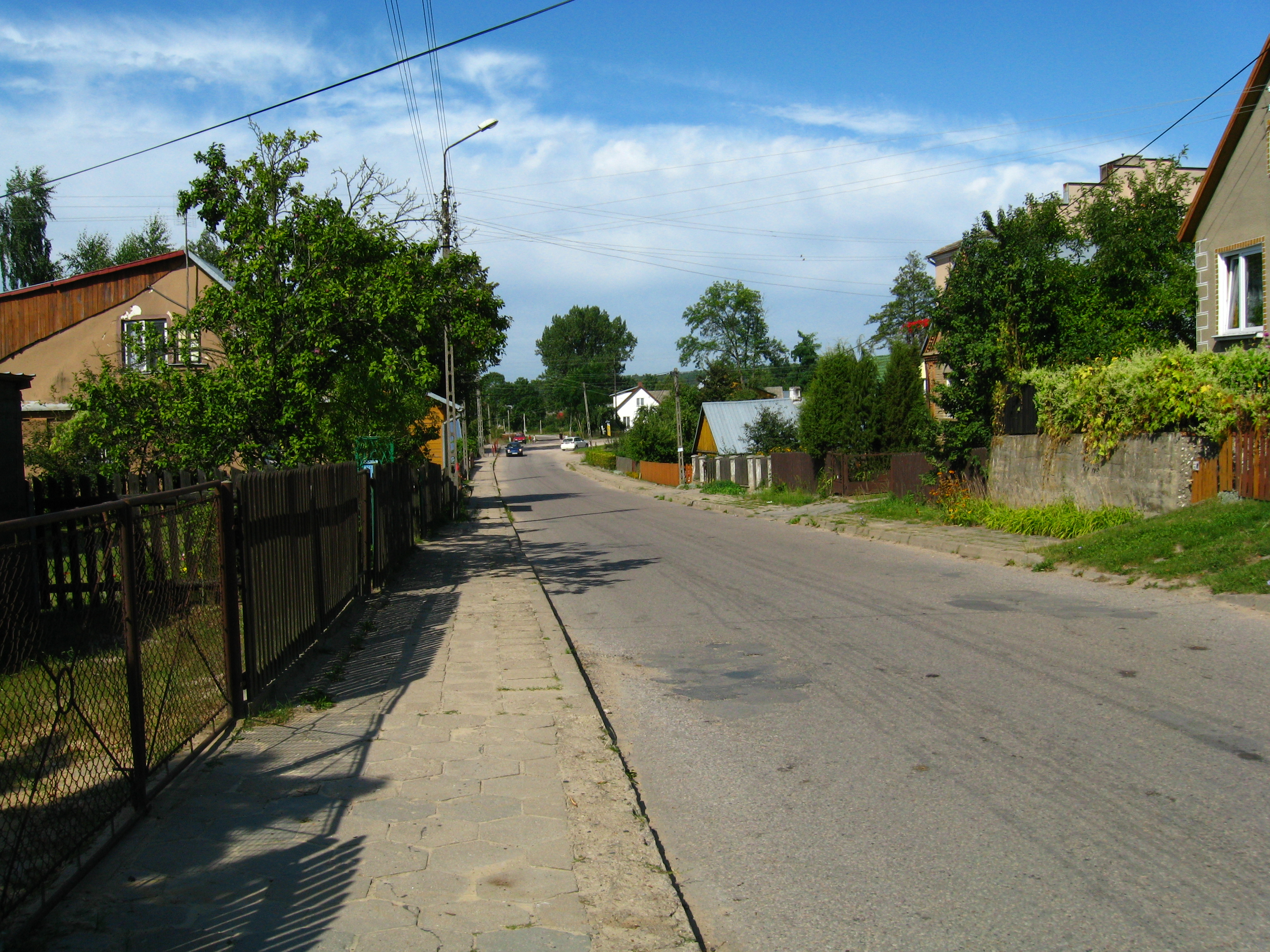

- Location within Poland
- Coordinates: 53°14′N 23°16′E
- Country: Poland
- Voivodeship: Podlaskie
- County: Białystok
- Gmina: Wasilków
- Population: 900

Studzianki [stuˈd͡ʑaŋkʲi] is a village in the administrative district of Gmina Wasilków, within Białystok County, Podlaskie Voivodeship, in north-eastern Poland.
