= Jurowce-Kolonia =

- Village
- Location within Poland
- Coordinates: 53°11′02″N 23°09′57″E
- Country: Poland
- Voivodeship: Podlaskie
- County: Białystok
- Gmina: Wasilków

Jurowce-Kolonia [juˈrɔft͡sɛ kɔˈlɔɲa] is a village in the administrative district of Gmina Wasilków, within Białystok County, Podlaskie Voivodeship, in north-eastern Poland.
