= Mieczysław Klimaszewski =

Polish geographer (1908–1995)

Mieczysław Marian Klimaszewski (26 July 1908 in Stanisławów – 27 November 1995 in Kraków) was a Polish geographer, geomorphologist and politician.

== Career ==
In June 1965, he was elected a member of the Polish Council of State. He was the deputy chairman of the Council from 1967–1972. As deputy chairman of the Council of State, he represented Poland at the 2,500 year celebration of the Persian Empire.

Klimaszewski was awarded honorary doctorates from several Universities, including those of Jena, Kiev and Bratislava and the University of Silesia in Katowice.

He also received the Order of Polonia Restituta in several grades (Grand Cross, Commander with Star, and Officer) and the Order of the Banner of Labour, 1st class (received twice), and the Commemorative Medal of the 2500th Anniversary of the founding of the Persian Empire (14/10/1971).
