= Rybniki, Podlaskie Voivodeship =

Rybniki
- Village
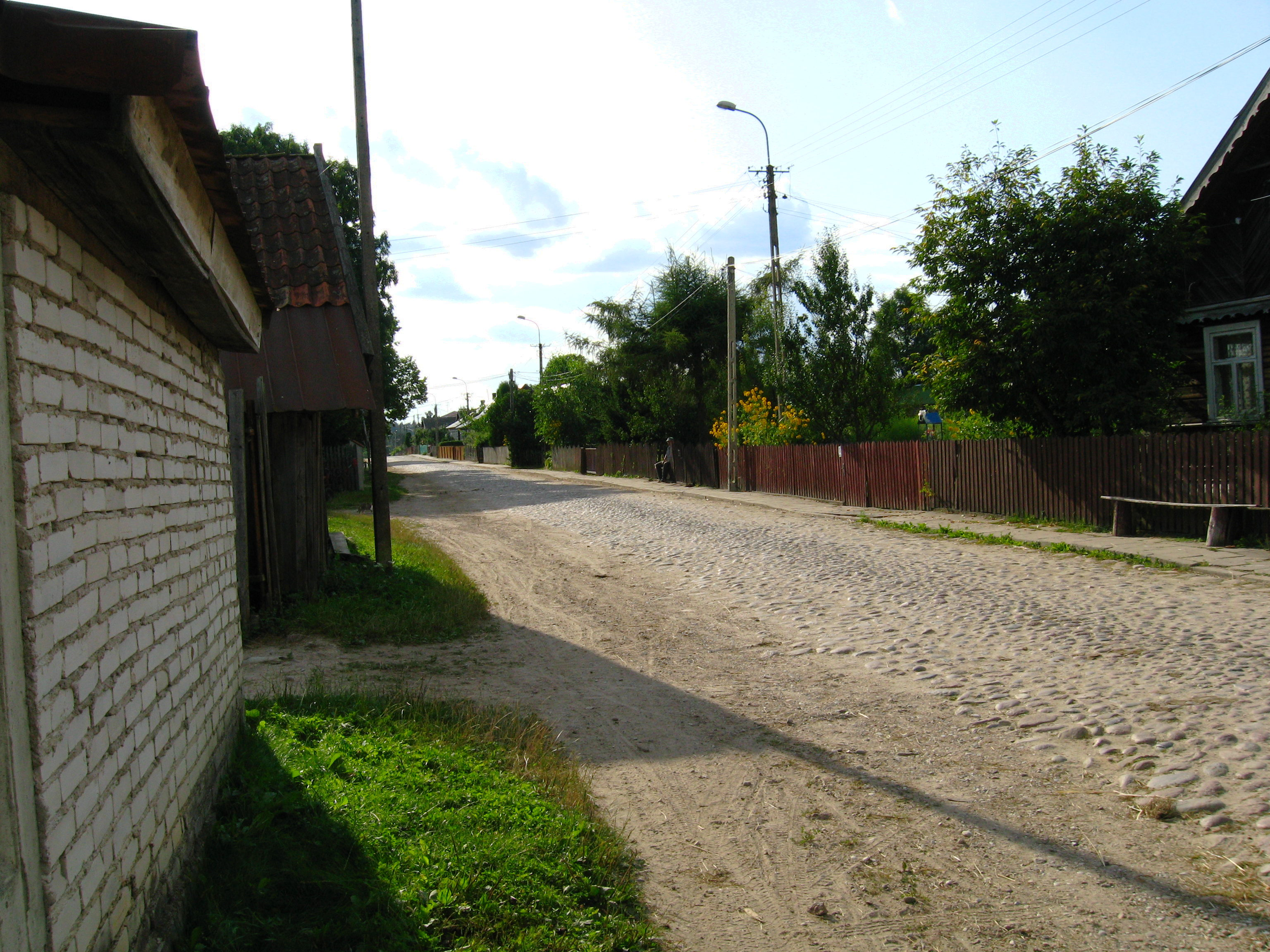

- Location within Poland
- Coordinates: 53°15′53″N 23°7′49″E
- Country: Poland
- Voivodeship: Podlaskie
- County: Białystok
- Gmina: Wasilków

Rybniki [rɨbˈɲikʲi] is a village in the administrative district of Gmina Wasilków, within Białystok County, Podlaskie Voivodeship, in north-eastern Poland.
