= Wólka-Przedmieście =

- Village
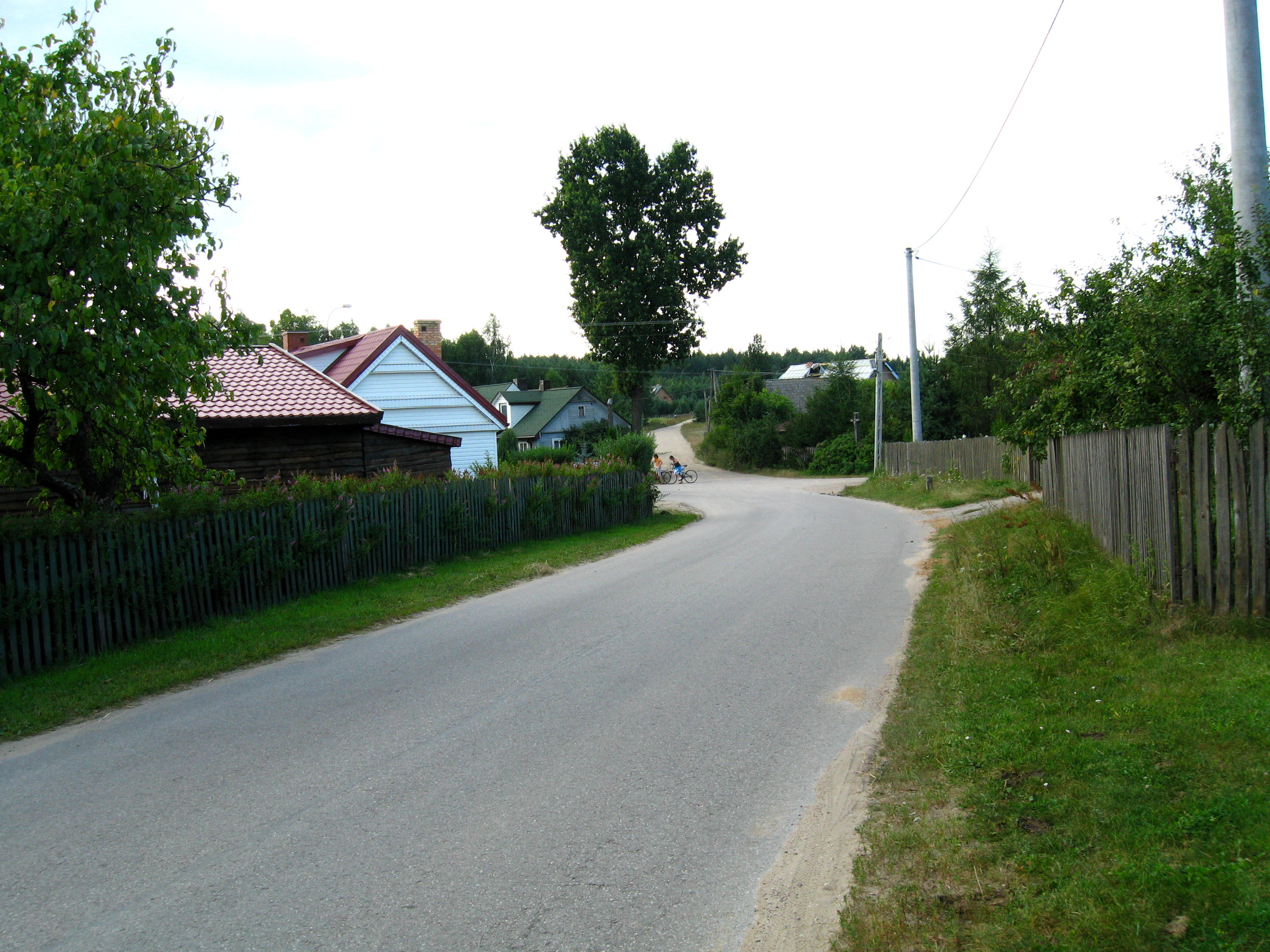

- Location within Poland
- Coordinates: 53°14′26″N 23°10′13″E
- Country: Poland
- Voivodeship: Podlaskie
- County: Białystok
- Gmina: Wasilków
- Population: 170

Wólka-Przedmieście [ˈvulka pʂɛdˈmjɛɕt͡ɕɛ] is a village in the administrative district of Gmina Wasilków, within Białystok County, Podlaskie Voivodeship, in north-eastern Poland.

== Climate ==
The climate is temperate, with mild winters and warm summers. The average temperature in January is -1 °C - -5 °C, and in July +17 °C - +19 °C.[3] Precipitation is 500-800 mm.
