= Nowodworce =

- Village
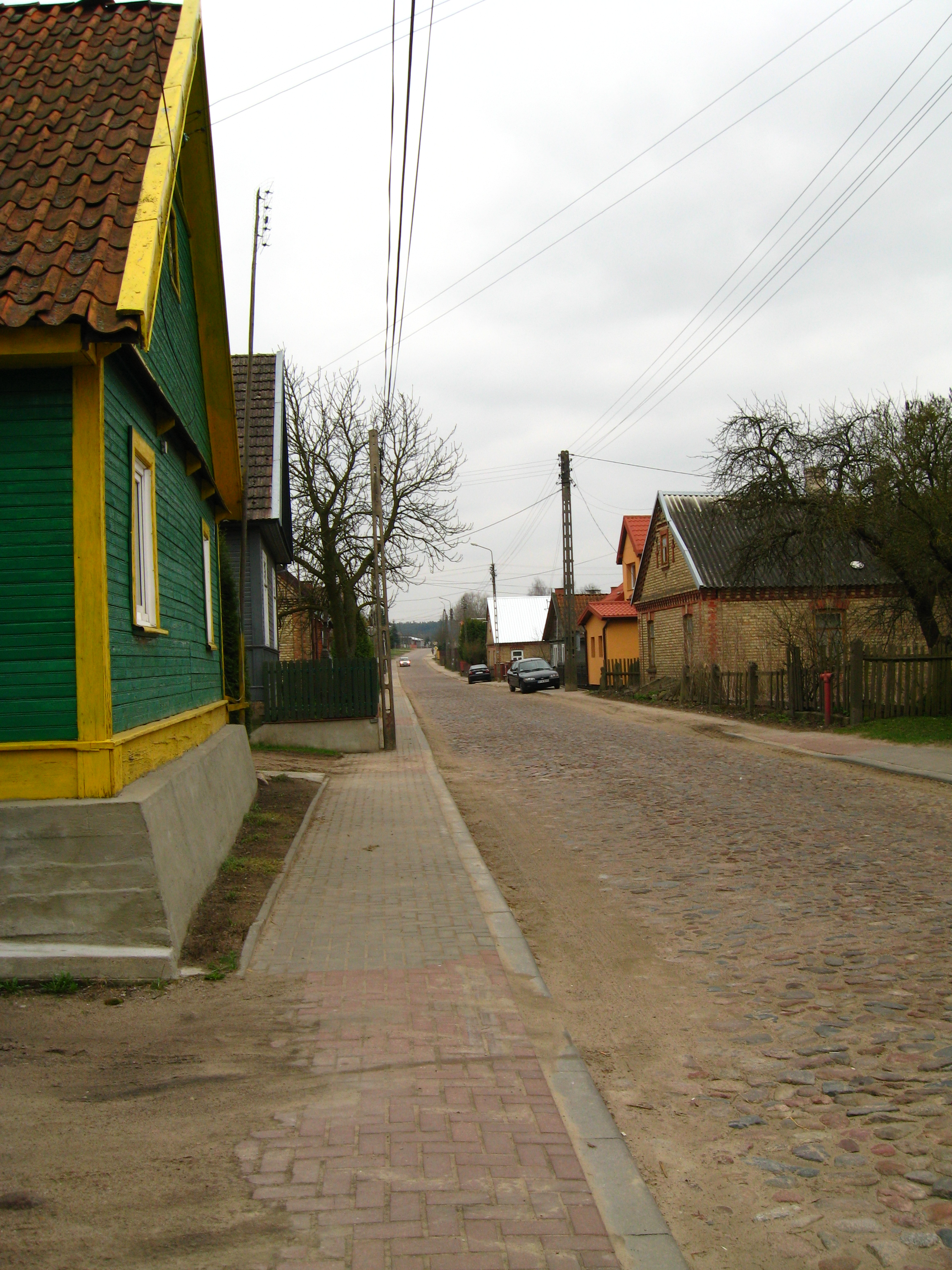

- Location within Poland
- Coordinates: 53°11′23″N 23°14′16″E
- Country: Poland
- Voivodeship: Podlaskie
- County: Białystok
- Gmina: Wasilków

Nowodworce [nɔvɔdˈvɔrt͡sɛ] is a village located in the administrative district of Gmina Wasilków, within Białystok County, Podlaskie Voivodeship, in north-eastern Poland. It is situated approximately 3 km (2 mi) south-east of Wasilków and 10 km (6 mi) north-east of the regional capital Białystok.
