= Burczak, Gmina Wasilków =

Burczak
- Village
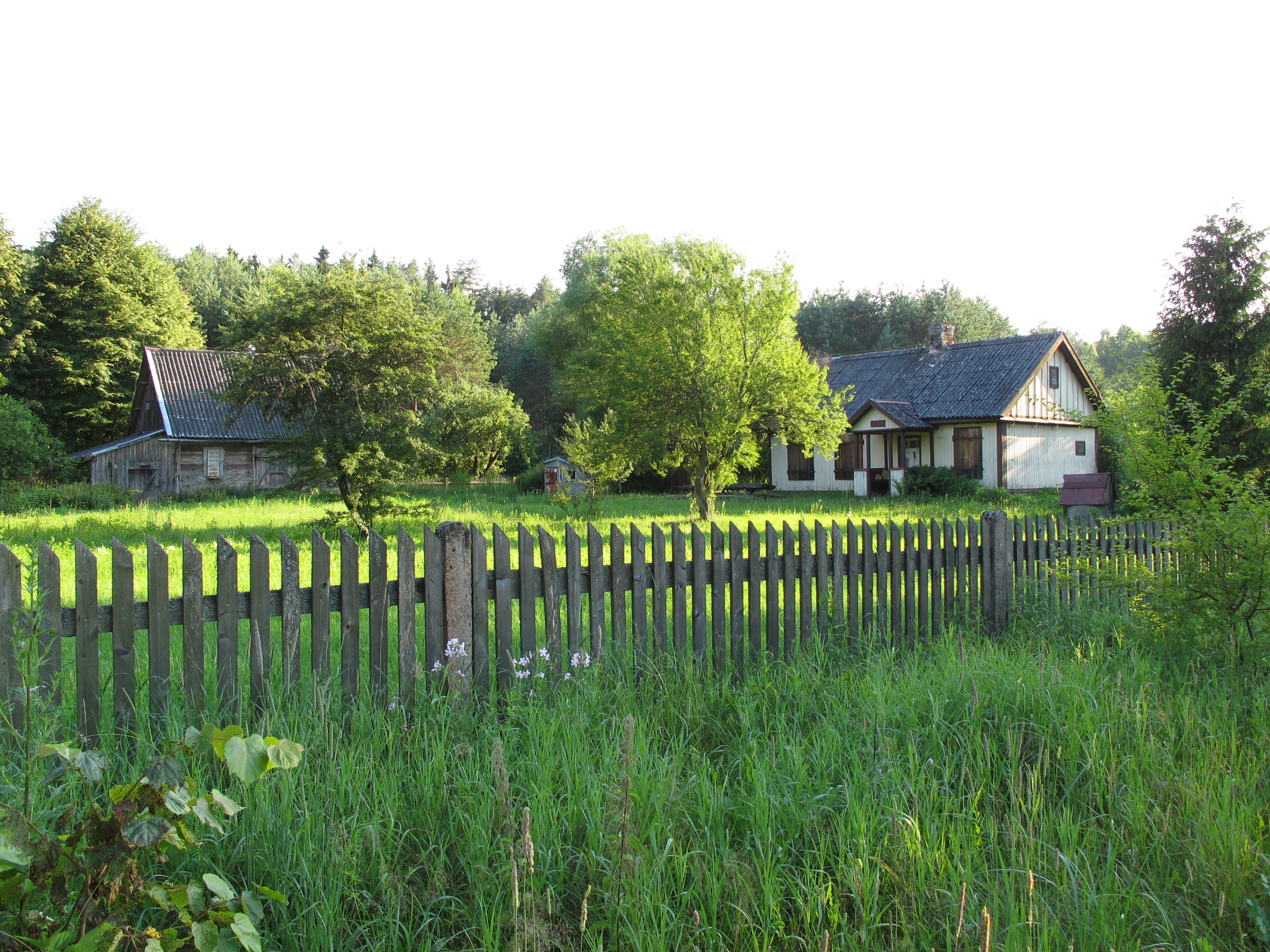

- Location within Poland
- Coordinates: 53°13′1″N 23°8′32″E
- Country: Poland
- Voivodeship: Podlaskie
- County: Białystok
- Gmina: Wasilków

Burczak (Polish pronunciation: [ˈburt͡ʂak]) is a village in the administrative district of Gmina Wasilków, within Białystok County, Podlaskie Voivodeship, in north-eastern Poland.
