= List of deputy chairmen of the Polish Council of State =

List of deputy chairmen of the Polish Council of State.

The deputy chairmen of the Polish Council of State were deputy heads of state of the People's Republic of Poland 1952–1989.

This is a list of office-holders:

== Term 1952–1957 ==
Name	Entered office	Left office
Jan Bohdan Dembowski	1952	1957
Franciszek Mazur	1952	1957
Stanisław Kulczyński	1956	1957
Czesław Wycech	1956	1957
Waclaw Barcikowski	1952	1956
Stefan Ignar	1952	1956

== Term 1957–1961 ==
Name	Entered office	Left office
Oskar Ryszard Lange	1957	1961
Boleslaw Podedworny	1957	1961
Stanisław Kulczyński	1957	1961
Jerzy Albrecht	1957	1960

== Term 1961–1965 ==
Name	Entered office	Left office
Oskar Ryszard Lange	1961	1965
Boleslaw Podedworny	1961	1965
Stanisław Kulczyński	1961	1965
Edward Ochab	1961	1964

== Term 1965–1969 ==
Name	Entered office	Left office
Oskar Ryszard Lange	1965	1965
Boleslaw Podedworny	1965	1969
Stanisław Kulczyński	1965	1969
Ignacy Loga-Sowinski	1965	1969
Mieczysław Klimaszewski	1965	1969

== Term 1969–1972 ==
Name	Entered office	Left office
Boleslaw Ruminski	1969	1971
Boleslaw Podedworny	1969	1971
Zygmunt Moskwa	1969	1972
Ignacy Loga-Sowinski	1969	1971
Stanisław Gucwa	1971	1972
Mieczysław Klimaszewski	1969	1972

== Term 1972–1976 ==
Name	Entered office	Left office
Zygmunt Moskwa	1972	1976
Janusz Groszkowski	1972	1976
Jozef Ozga-Michalski	1972	1976
Wladyslaw Kruczek	1972	1976

== Term 1976–1980 ==
Name	Entered office	Left office
Edward Babiuch	1976	1980
Tadeusz Witold Mlynczak	1976	1980
Zdzislaw Tomal	1976	1980
Wladyslaw Kruczek	1976	1980

== Term 1980–1985 ==
Name	Entered office	Left office
Tadeusz Witold Mlynczak	1980	1985
Zdzislaw Tomal	1980	1984
Jerzy Ziętek	1980	1985
Kazimierz Secomski	1980	1985
Boleslaw Struzek	1984	1985

== Term 1985–1989 ==
Name	Entered office	Left office
Tadeusz Witold Mlynczak	1985	1989
Tadeusz Szelachowski	1985	1989
Zenon Komender	1985	1989
Kazimierz Barcikowski	1985	1989
