= Dąbrówki, Podlaskie Voivodeship =

Dąbrówki
- Village
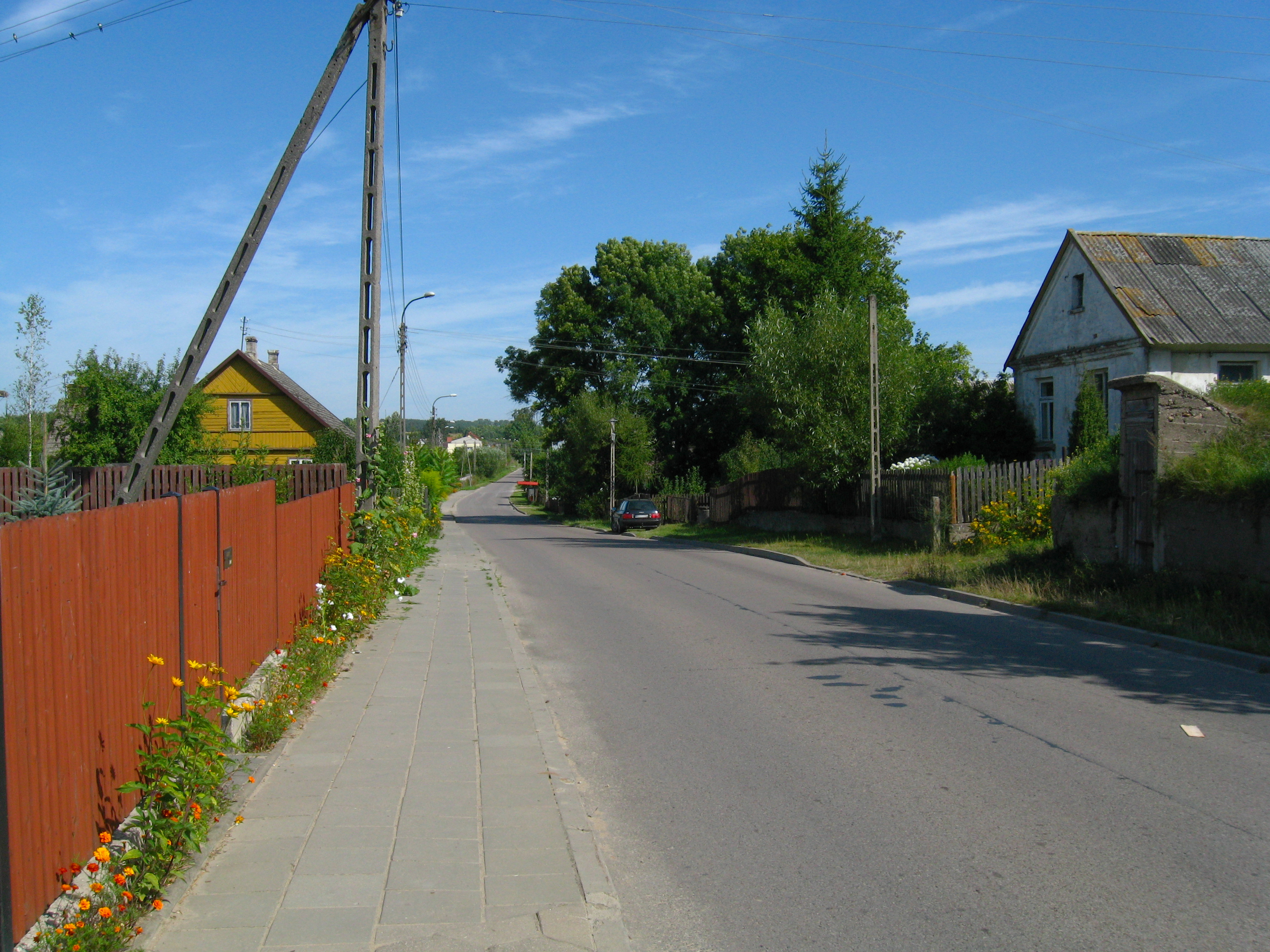
- Street in Dąbrówki

- Location within Poland
- Coordinates: 53°12′48″N 23°14′49″E
- Country: Poland
- Voivodeship: Podlaskie
- County: Białystok
- Gmina: Wasilków

Dąbrówki (Polish pronunciation: [dɔmˈbrufkʲi]) is a village in the administrative district of Gmina Wasilków, within Białystok County, Podlaskie Voivodeship, in north-eastern Poland.

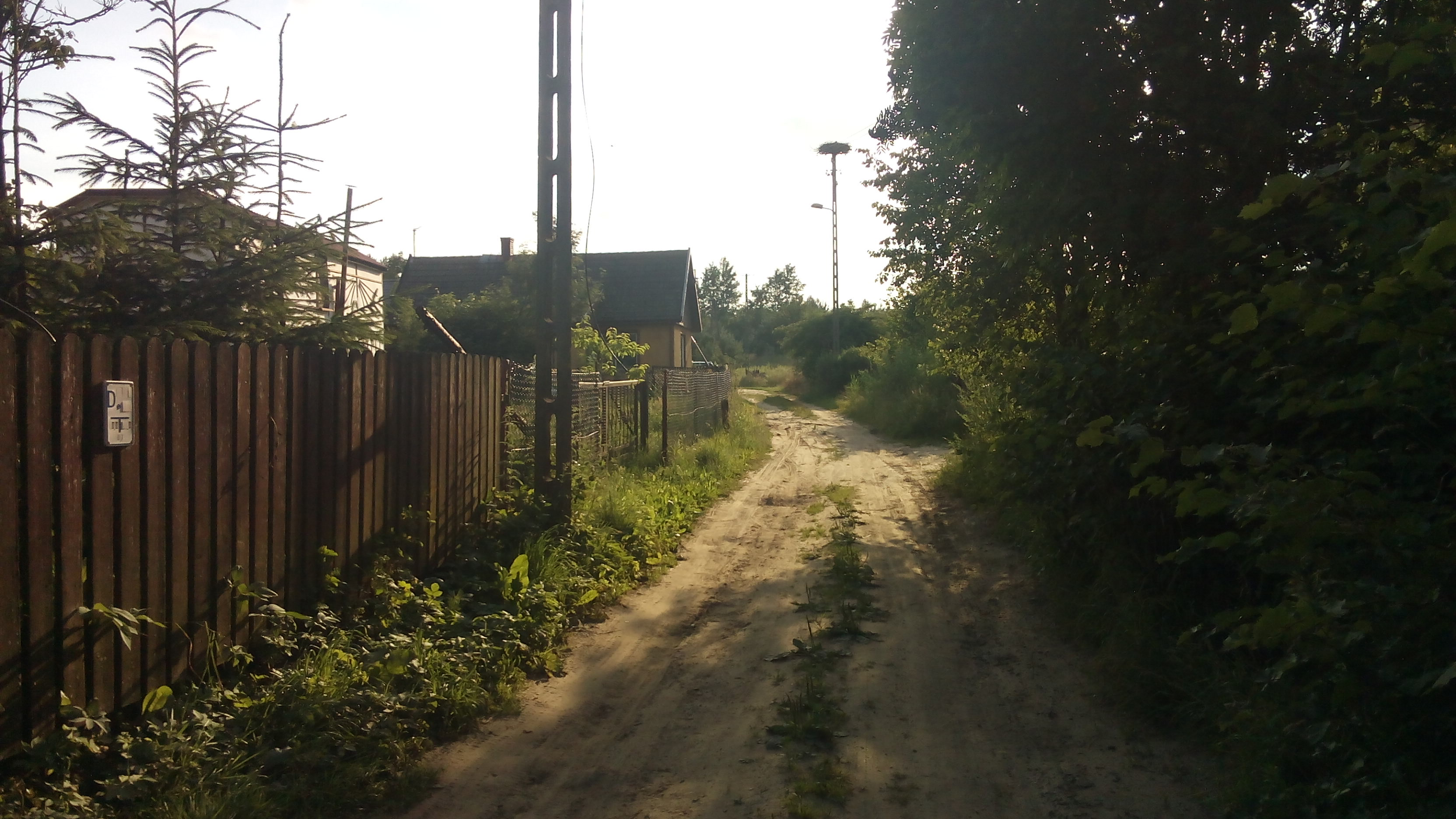
Alleyway in Dąbrówki
