= Horodnianka-Kolonia =

- Village
- Location within Poland
- Coordinates: 53°15′20″N 23°14′44″E
- Country: Poland
- Voivodeship: Podlaskie
- County: Białystok
- Gmina: Wasilków

Horodnianka-Kolonia [xɔrɔdˈɲanka kɔˈlɔɲa] is a village in the administrative district of Gmina Wasilków, within Białystok County, Podlaskie Voivodeship, in north-eastern Poland.
