= Osowicze =

- Village
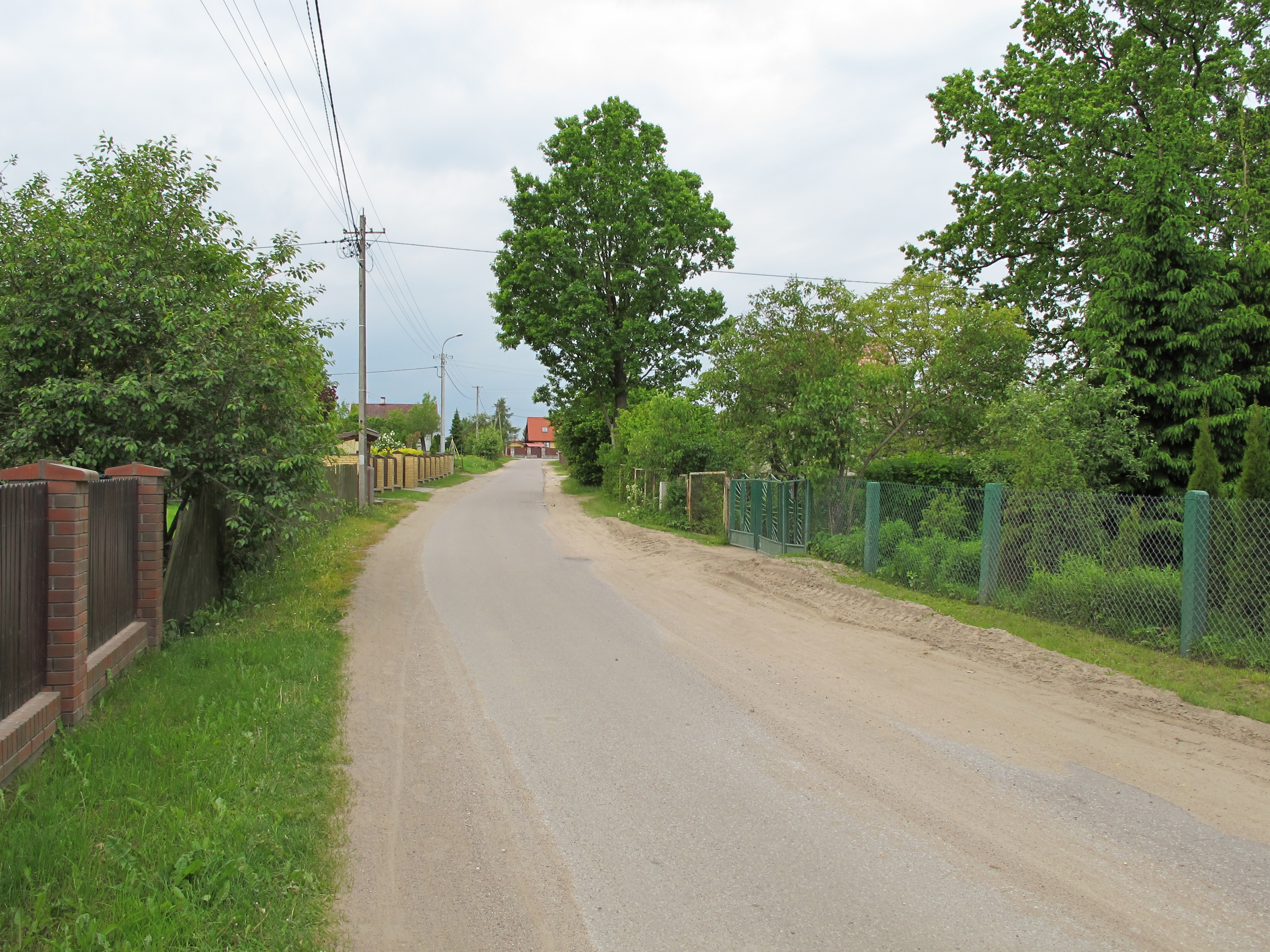
- Houses by the unpaved road in Osowicze

- Location within Poland
- Coordinates: 53°10′52.03″N 23°7′29.45″E
- Country: Poland
- Voivodeship: Podlaskie
- County: Białystok
- Gmina: Wasilków

Osowicze [ɔsɔˈvit͡ʂɛ] is a village in the administrative district of Gmina Wasilków, within Białystok County, Podlaskie Voivodeship, in north-eastern Poland.
