= Stanisław Kulczyński =

Polish politician

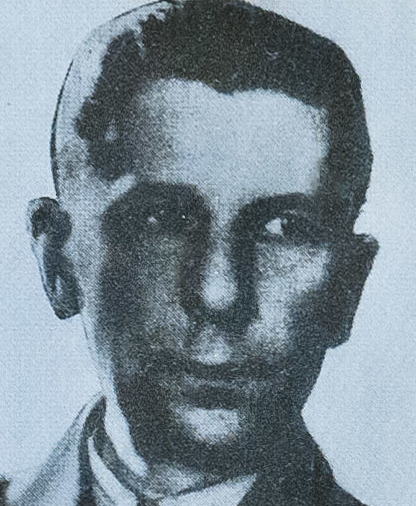
- Stanisław Kulczyński
- Born: 23 September 1895; Lviv, Austro-Hungary
- Died: 12 April 1975 (aged 79); Wrocław, Poland
- Known for: Plant ecology; academic leadership
- Scientific career
- Fields: Botany
- Workplaces: University of Wrocław

Stanisław Leon Kulczyński (9 May 1895 – 12 July 1975) was a Polish botanist and politician.

Son of Władysław Kulczyński the zoologist. Professor of Lwów University (in the Second Polish Republic, its rector from 1936). He resigned his position at the university in 1938 in protest of the institution of ghetto benches, writing to the Minister of Education that "if one destroys a power plant, it is dark at once, but if one destroys the Universities, it is dark fifty years hence." Member of the Polish Secret State, he took part in underground education in Poland during World War II. After the war, when Lwów was annexed by the Soviet Union, he moved to "Regained Territories" (Wrocław), where he became active in the Wrocław University and Wrocław Politechnic. He joined the Stronnictwo Demokratyczne party, was elected to Sejm and was a member of several governmental commissions. Stanislaw Kulczynski was deputy chairman of the Polish Council of State 1956–1969 and as such one of four acting chairmen of the Chairmen of the Council of State (head of state) from 7 to 12 August 1964.

== Honours and awards ==
Kulczyński was awarded the Order of the Builders of People's Poland (1964), the Order of the Banner of Labour 1st class, and the Grand Cross of the Order of Polonia Restituta. In 1963, the University of Wroclaw, Wroclaw University of Technology awarded him an honorary doctorate in 1965.
