= Katrynka =

- Village
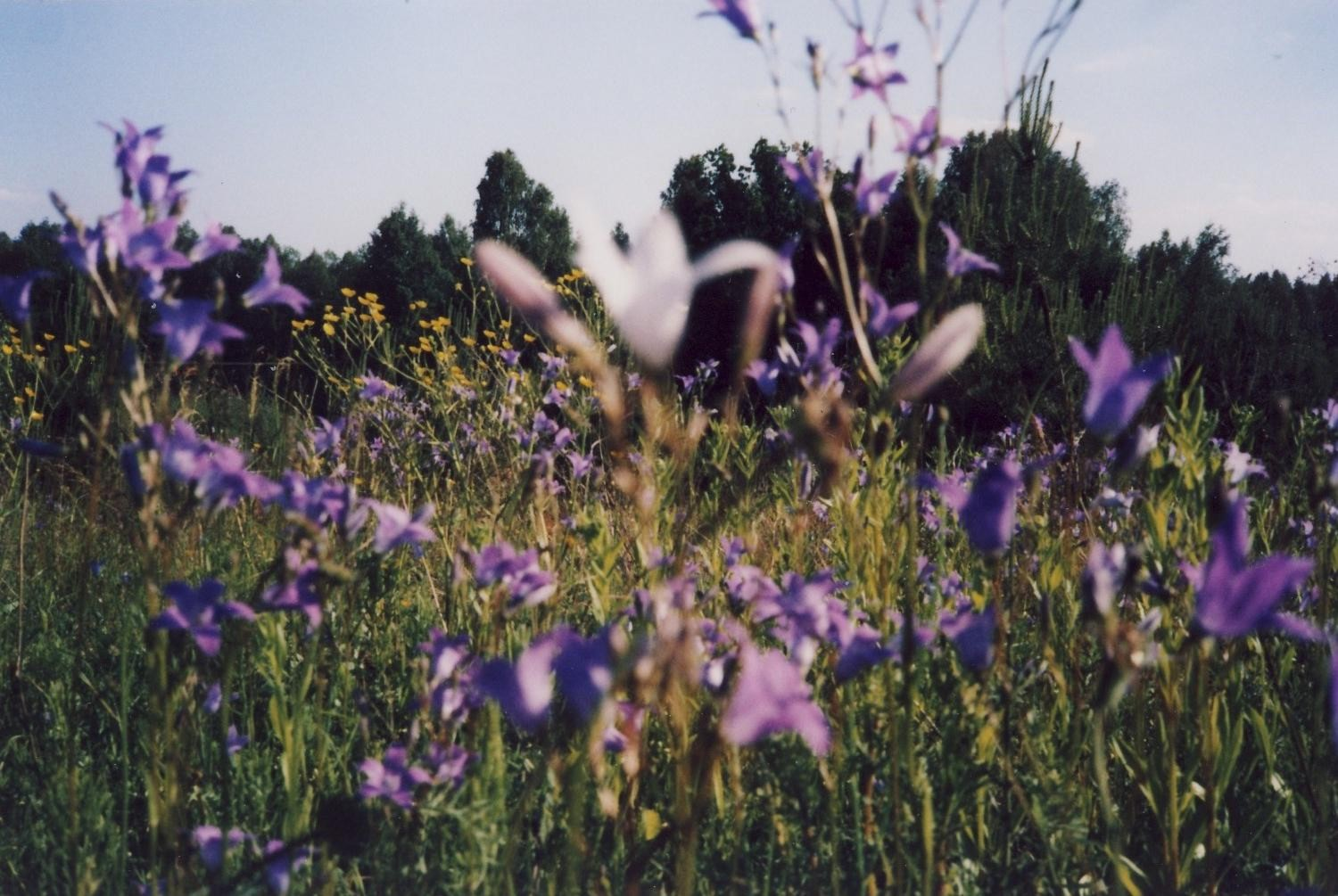

- Location within Poland
- Coordinates: 53°11′45″N 23°09′15″E
- Country: Poland
- Voivodeship: Podlaskie
- County: Białystok
- Gmina: Wasilków

Katrynka (Polish pronunciation: [kaˈtrɨŋka]) is a village in the administrative district of Gmina Wasilków, within Białystok County, Podlaskie Voivodeship, in north-eastern Poland.
