= Mostek-Gajówka =

- Village
- Location within Poland
- Coordinates: 53°11′35″N 23°09′25″E
- Country: Poland
- Voivodeship: Podlaskie
- County: Białystok
- Gmina: Wasilków

Mostek-Gajówka [ˈmɔstɛk ɡaˈjufka] is a village in the administrative district of Gmina Wasilków, within Białystok County, Podlaskie Voivodeship, in north-eastern Poland.
