= Wólka Poduchowna =

- Village
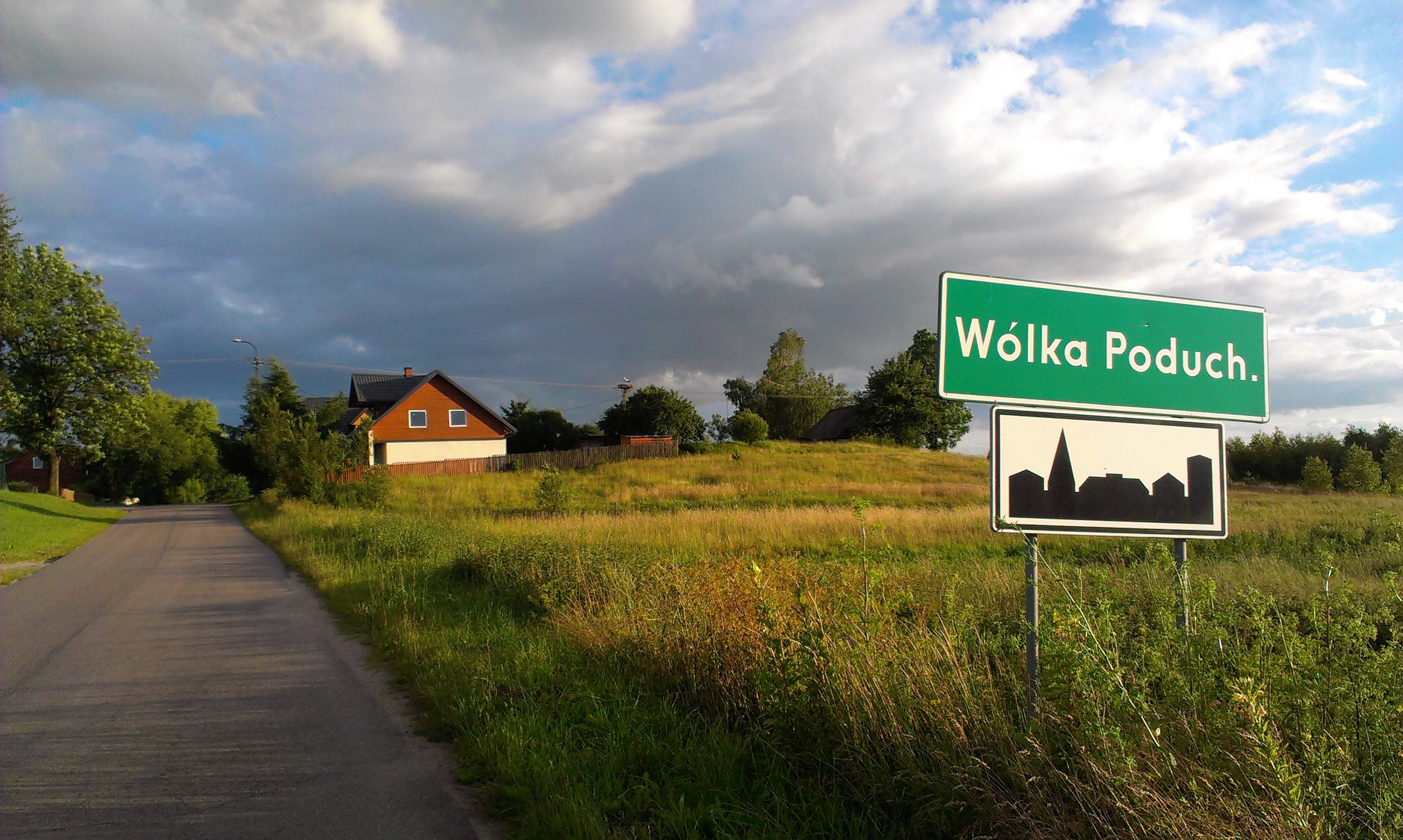

- Location within Poland
- Coordinates: 53°14′10″N 23°10′32″E
- Country: Poland
- Voivodeship: Podlaskie
- County: Białystok
- Gmina: Wasilków

Wólka Poduchowna [ˈvulka pɔduˈxɔvna] is a village in the administrative district of Gmina Wasilków, within Białystok County, Podlaskie Voivodeship, in north-eastern Poland.
