= Zapieczki =

- Village
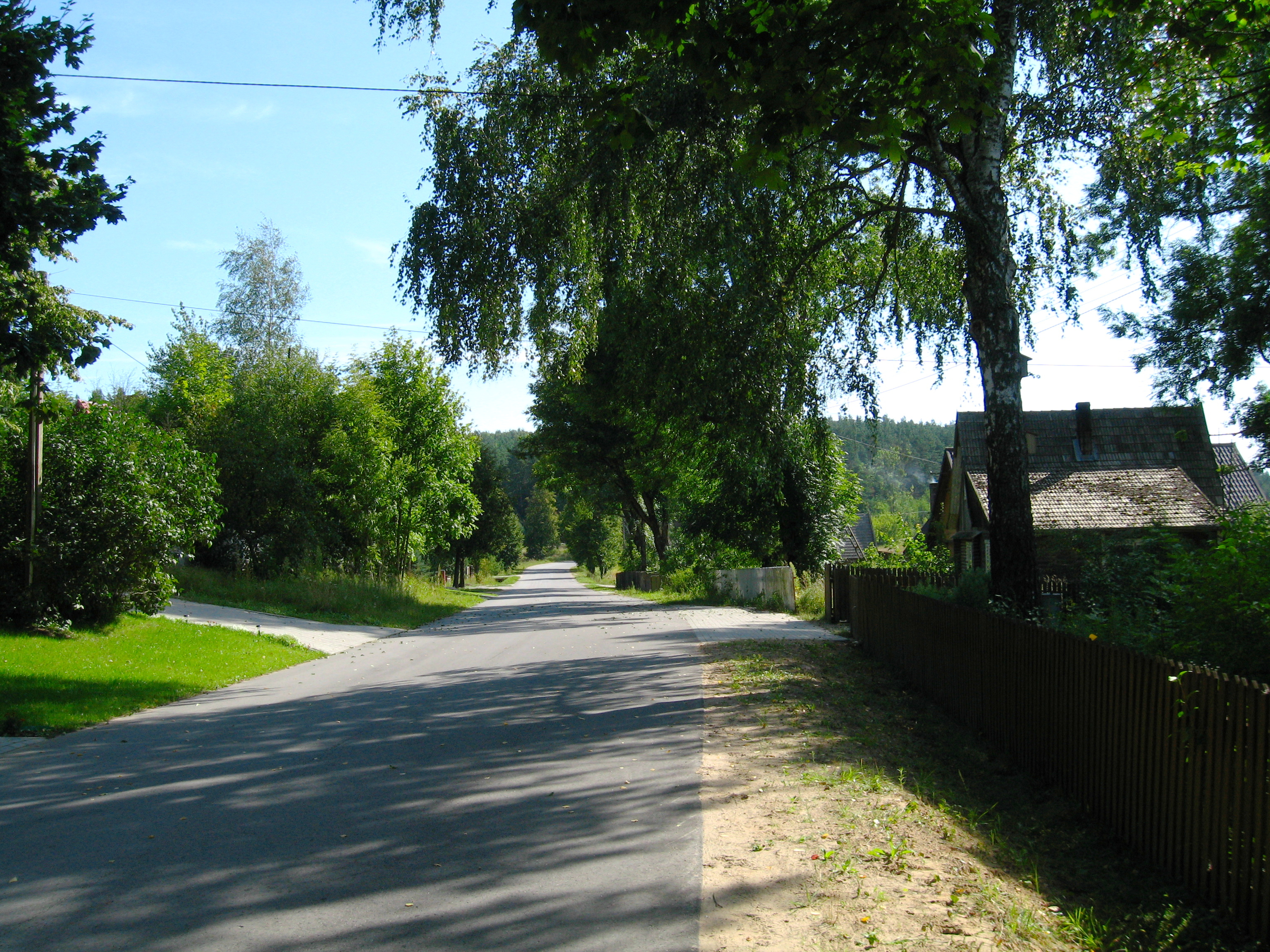

- Location within Poland
- Coordinates: 53°14′10″N 23°18′58″E
- Country: Poland
- Voivodeship: Podlaskie
- County: Białystok
- Gmina: Wasilków

Zapieczki [zaˈpʲɛt͡ʂkʲi] is a village in the administrative district of Gmina Wasilków, within Białystok County, Podlaskie Voivodeship, in north-eastern Poland.
