= Mostek, Podlaskie Voivodeship =

Mostek
- Village
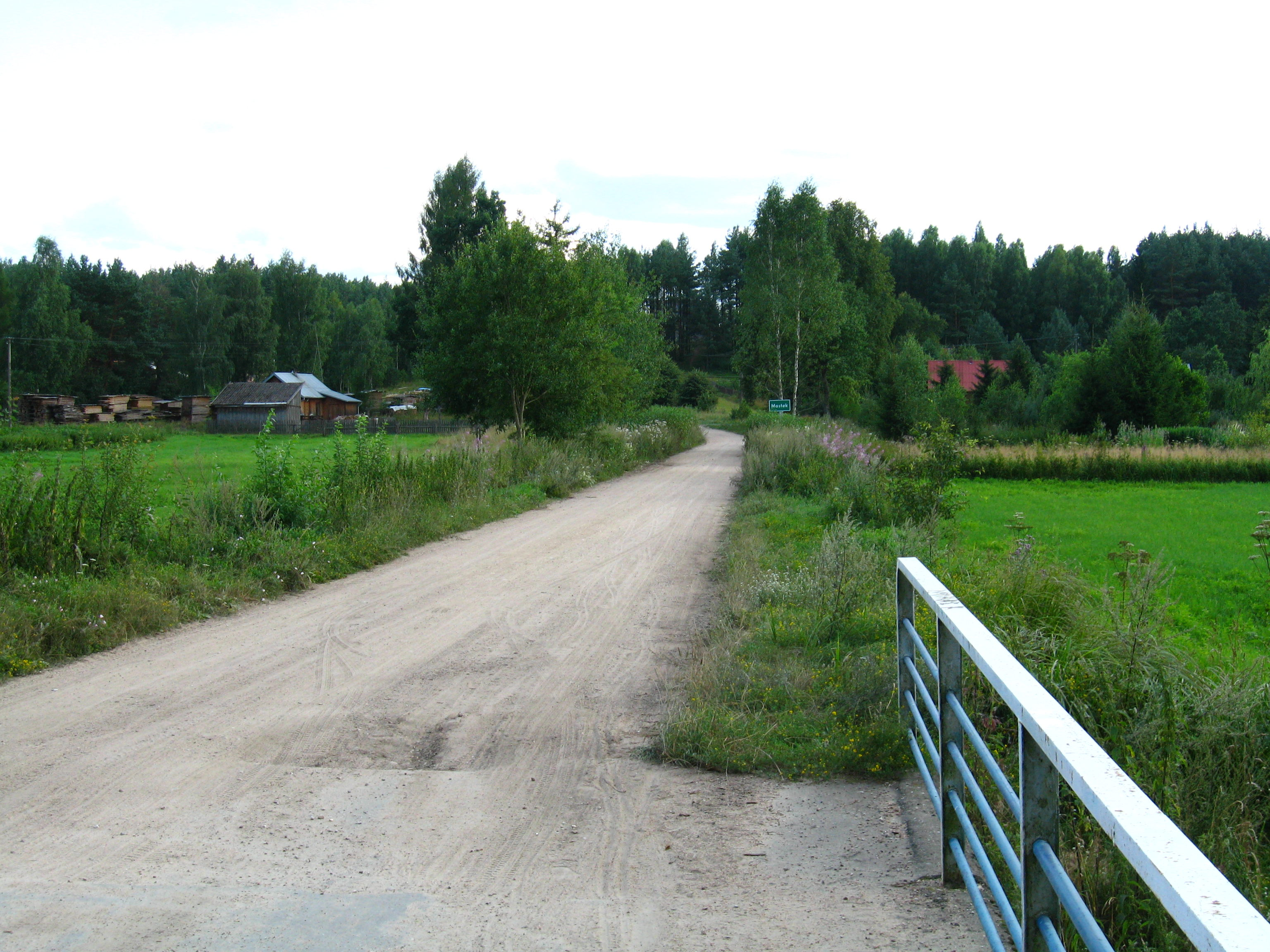

- Location within Poland
- Coordinates: 53°11′25″N 23°09′35″E
- Country: Poland
- Voivodeship: Podlaskie
- County: Białystok
- Gmina: Wasilków

Mostek [ˈmɔstɛk] is a village in the administrative district of Gmina Wasilków, within Białystok County, Podlaskie Voivodeship, in north-eastern Poland.
