= Jerzy Klimaszewski =

Polish actor

- Born: 3 July 1903; Spała, Congress Poland
- Died: 23 March 1945 (aged 41); Sachsenhausen concentration camp, Nazi Germany
- Occupation: Actor
- Years active: 1926–1938

Jerzy Klimaszewski (3 July 1903 – 23 March 1945) was a Polish actor. He was active in theatre and film between 1926 and 1938. During the Second World War, he was imprisoned in Auschwitz and Sachsenhausen concentration camps; he died in the latter in March 1945, only two months before the end of the war.

== Selected filmography ==
- Huragan (1928)
- Janko muzykant (1930)
- Szpieg w masce (1933)
- Kazdemu wolno kochac (1933)
- Jego wielka miłość (1936)
- Jadzia (1936)
- Amerykańska awantura (1936)
- Dziewczyna szuka miłości (1938)
