= Gmina Wasilków =

Gmina Wasilków Wasilków Commune
- Gmina
- Coat of arms
- Interactive map of Gmina Wasilków
- Coordinates (Wasilków): 53°12′18″N 23°12′16″E
- Country: Poland
- Voivodeship: Podlaskie
- County: Białystok County
- Seat: Wasilków

Area
  - Total: 127.17 km^{2} (49.10 sq mi)

Population (2024)
  - Total: 21 299
  - Density: 0.17/km^{2} (0.43/sq mi)
  - Urban: 12 831
  - Rural: 8 468
- Time zone: UTC+1 (CET)
  - Summer (DST): UTC+2 (CEST)
- Website: https://wasilkow.pl/

Wasilków commune is an urban-rural commune (administrative district) in Białystok County, Podlaskie Voivodeship, in north-eastern Poland. Its seat is the Wasilków town, which lies approximately 3 km (1.9 mi) north of the regional capital Białystok.Wasilków commune is located on the Supraśl River, surrounded by the forests of the Knyszyn Forest.

The commune covers an area of 127.17 square kilometres (49.1 sq mi), and as of 2024 its total population is 21 299 (out of which the population of Wasilków amounts to 12 831, and the population of the rural part of the commune is 8 468).

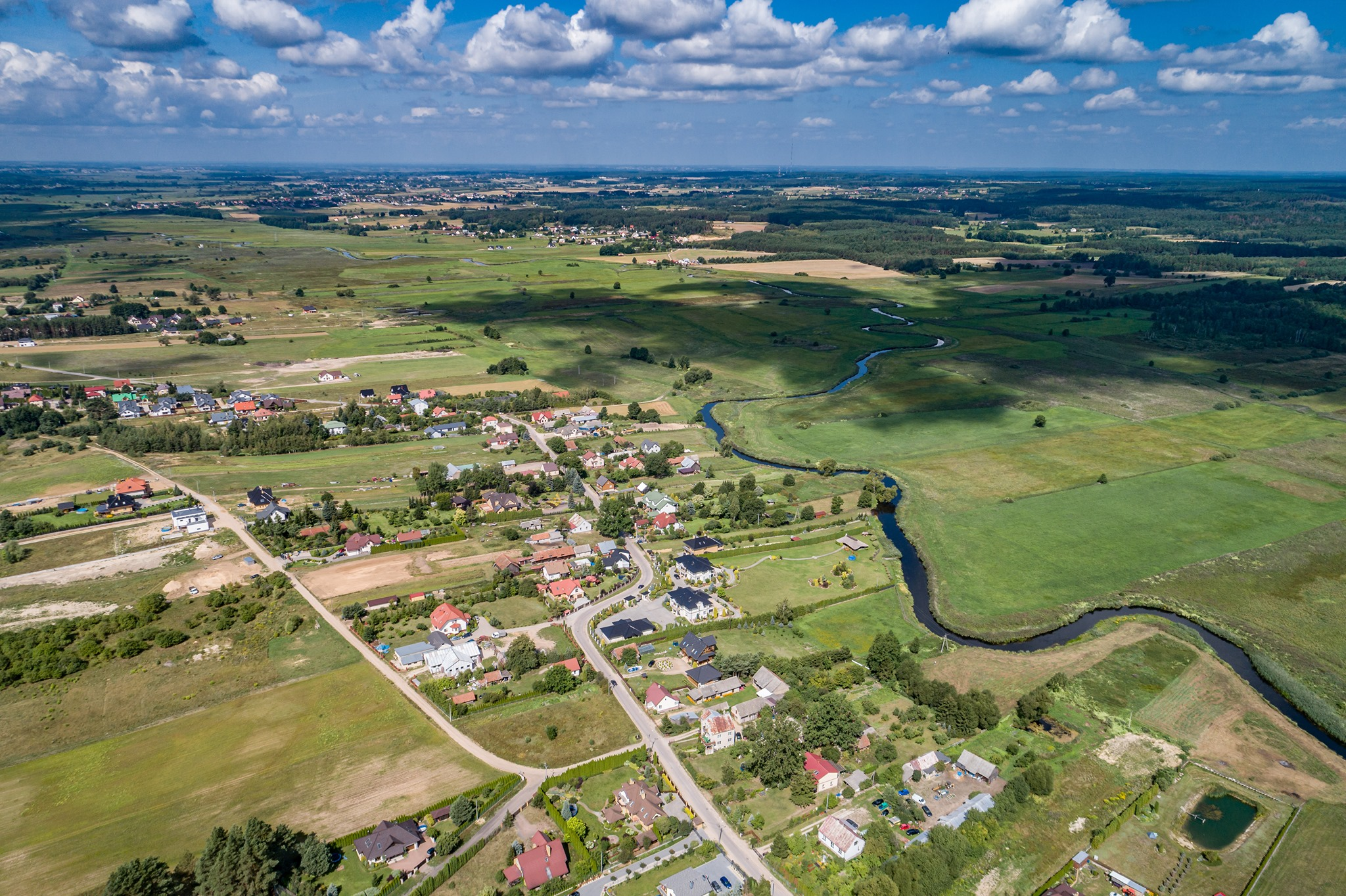

== History ==
The first traces of settlement in the Wasilków commune date back to the Middle Stone Age. Excavations conducted near the town of Nowodworce provided evidence of the settlement of these areas in the Bronze Age, which lasted in Poland until around 1800 BCE. One of the most interesting was the discovery of a flint mine in the Knyszyn Forest near Rybniki. As a result of the research, about fifty archaeological sites have been discovered in the commune. Traces of prehistoric and early-historic settlements have been found in the vicinity of almost every modern village in the Wasilków commune. However, nothing is known about the beginnings of Slavic settlement in Wasilków.

In the 11th century the territory of Wasilków belonged to Kievan Rus. In 1340, the area of Wasilkow was incorporated into Lithuania by prince Gediminas. However, earlier this area belonged to Mazovia. The first mention in written sources about the area where the town and the Wasilków starosty was later established in 1358.

A breakthrough date in the history of Wasilków is December 8, 1566, when King Zygmunt August granted him city rights and a coat of arms. The city was inhabited by people from the vicinity of Goniądz, Tykocin and Białystok. Two days after granting city rights - on December 10, 1566, King Zygmunt August issued a privilege allowing the creation of a Catholic parish.

In the middle of the 17th century Wasilków was inhabited by about 500 people, and the entire starosty additionally 400 people. The first records from this period appear about Jews who came from Choroszcz and settled in Wasilków. Before the first partition of Poland, Wasilków had about 1,500 inhabitants. After the Third Partition of Poland, Wasilków was incorporated into the Białystok Department of New East Prussia, and from 1807, under the Treaty of Tylża, into the Russian Partition.

Around 1880, Wasilków had 3,880 inhabitants. There were 12 textile factories in the town, ten of which were owned by Jews. All plants employed a total of about 300 people.

The tragic date in the history of the city is May 5, 1895, when a great fire destroyed almost half of Wasilków, and 10 people died in the fire. At the end of the 19th century, Wasilków had approx. 4,000 inhabitants. residents.

In November 1918, there were only two textile factories operating in the city, employing nearly 70 workers. World War II began in these lands on September 16, 1939, with the entry of the German army. Less than a week later, a cavalry detachment of the Soviet Red Army entered the Tui. This is how the Soviet occupation began, during which several dozen of Wasilkow families were deported to Kazakhstan. In August 1941, the Germans established a ghetto in Wasilków, in which about 1,250 Jews were held. The following year, they were taken to Treblinka, where they were murdered.

As a result of the war, the industry in Wasilków ceased to exist. The city was destroyed in 20%. In the post-war period, a significant date is July 1, 1947, when Father Wacław Rabczyński was appointed vicar and administrator of the parish under the invocation of Transfiguration of the Lord in Wasilków. The summary of the activities of Fr. Rabczyński began in 1958 and completed in 1966 the construction of the church of Of the Blessed Virgin Mary, Mother of Mercy at Kościuszko Street. Father Wacław Rabczyński was undoubtedly one of the most outstanding figures in the post-war history of the Wasilkow region.

In 1946 Wasilków had 3,948 inhabitants. The determinant of the changes taking place in the post-war years was the development of Emilia Plater Wool Industry Plant, which in its heyday employed about 2,500 employees. In 1959, the construction of an elementary school on Mickiewicza Street began, and in 1982 a primary school on Polna Street, which was officially opened on May 22, 1985.

After World War II, Wasilków became a satellite city of Białystok. On May 27, 1990, the first half-century free and democratic elections to local self-government took place.

In 2022, the number of inhabitants of the city and commune of Wasilków reaches nearly 19 thousand. and is constantly growing. Wasilków has become one of the most dynamically developing local government units in Podlaskie.

== Sights ==
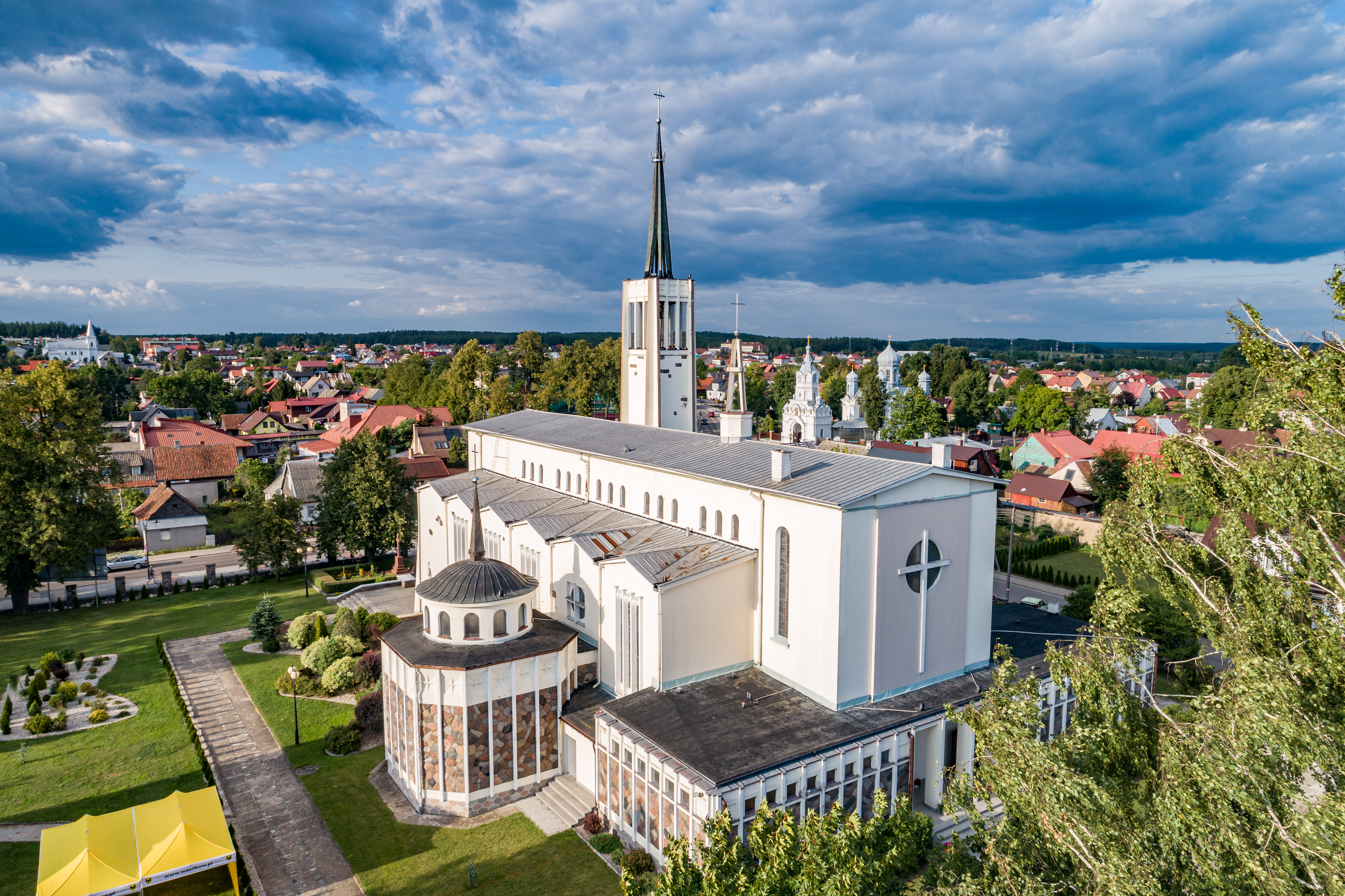
Church of the Blessed Virgin Mary, Mother of Mercy in Wasilków

Church of the Blessed Virgin Mary, Mother of Mercy in Wasilkow

The construction of the church was completed in 1966 thanks to the efforts of priest Wacław Rabczyński. The previous church, which was demolished in 1867 by the tsarist authorities, was situated in the same place. The building combines the styles of old Christian and modernist architecture. In the middle of the church there is an altar, in line with the changes introduced to the liturgy by the Second Vatican Council. Since 2005, the International Festival of Organ and Chamber Music has been held here every year.

Orthodox church of Saints Peter and Paul in Wasilkow

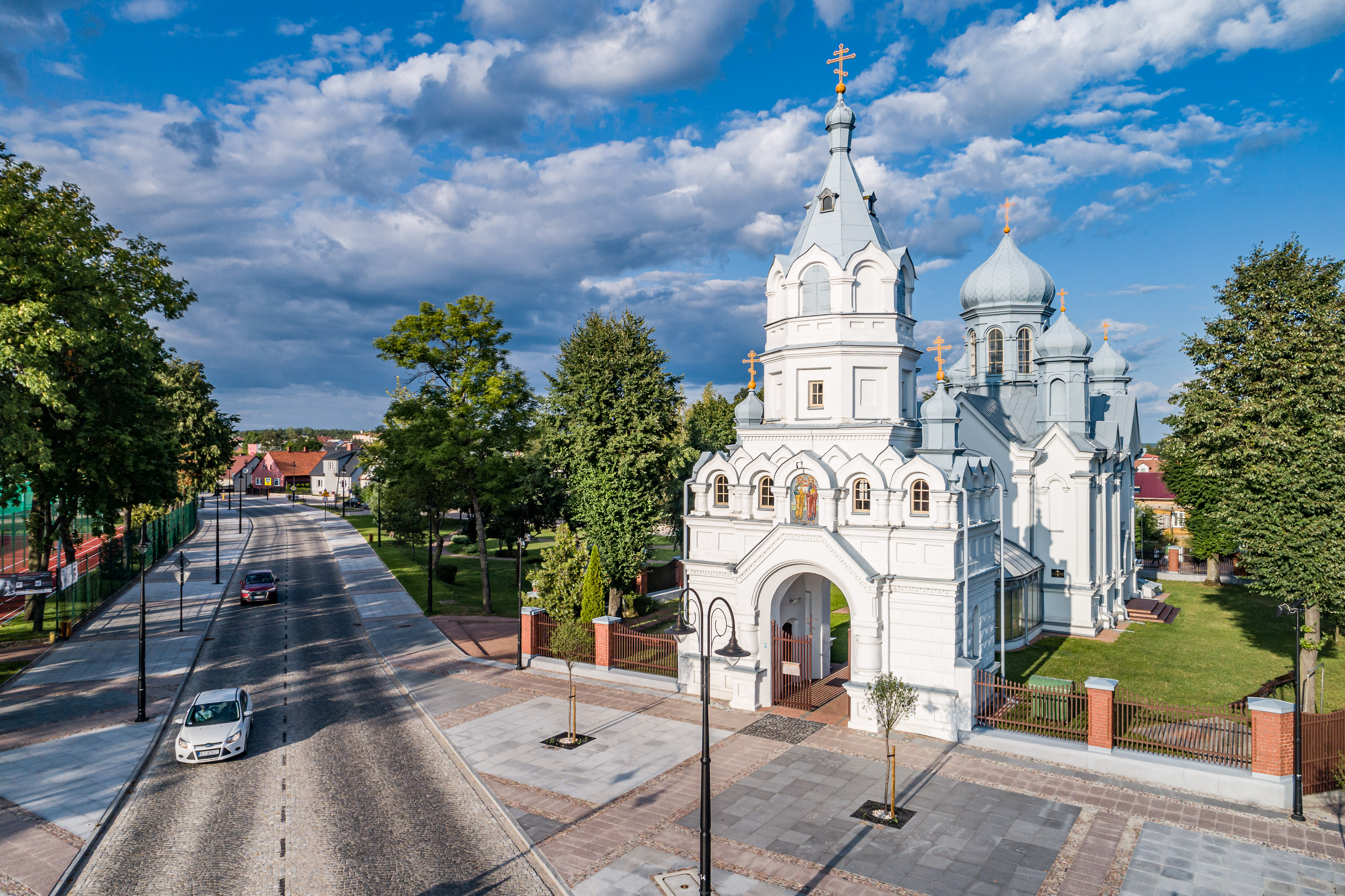
Orthodox church of Saints Peter and Paul in Wasilków

The five-dome, brick church was built in the mid-nineteenth century and consecrated in 1853 by the Bishop of Brzeg, Ignacy. In 1857 a free-standing, brick belfry was built in the style of the church, which also serves as a gate. In 1867, the church was partially burnt. The following year, after being struck by lightning, it burned down completely. Reconstruction ended in 1875.

Church of Transfiguration of the Lord in Wasilkow

The beginnings of the parish are closely related to the granting of city rights to the settlement of Wasilkow by king Zygmunt August on December 8, 1556. Two days after this event, the King issued a foundation document under which a wooden temple in Wasilków was erected. The first temple was built on the so-called "Kościelisko" - on the hill behind the present church. The modern brick neo-baroque church was built in 1883.

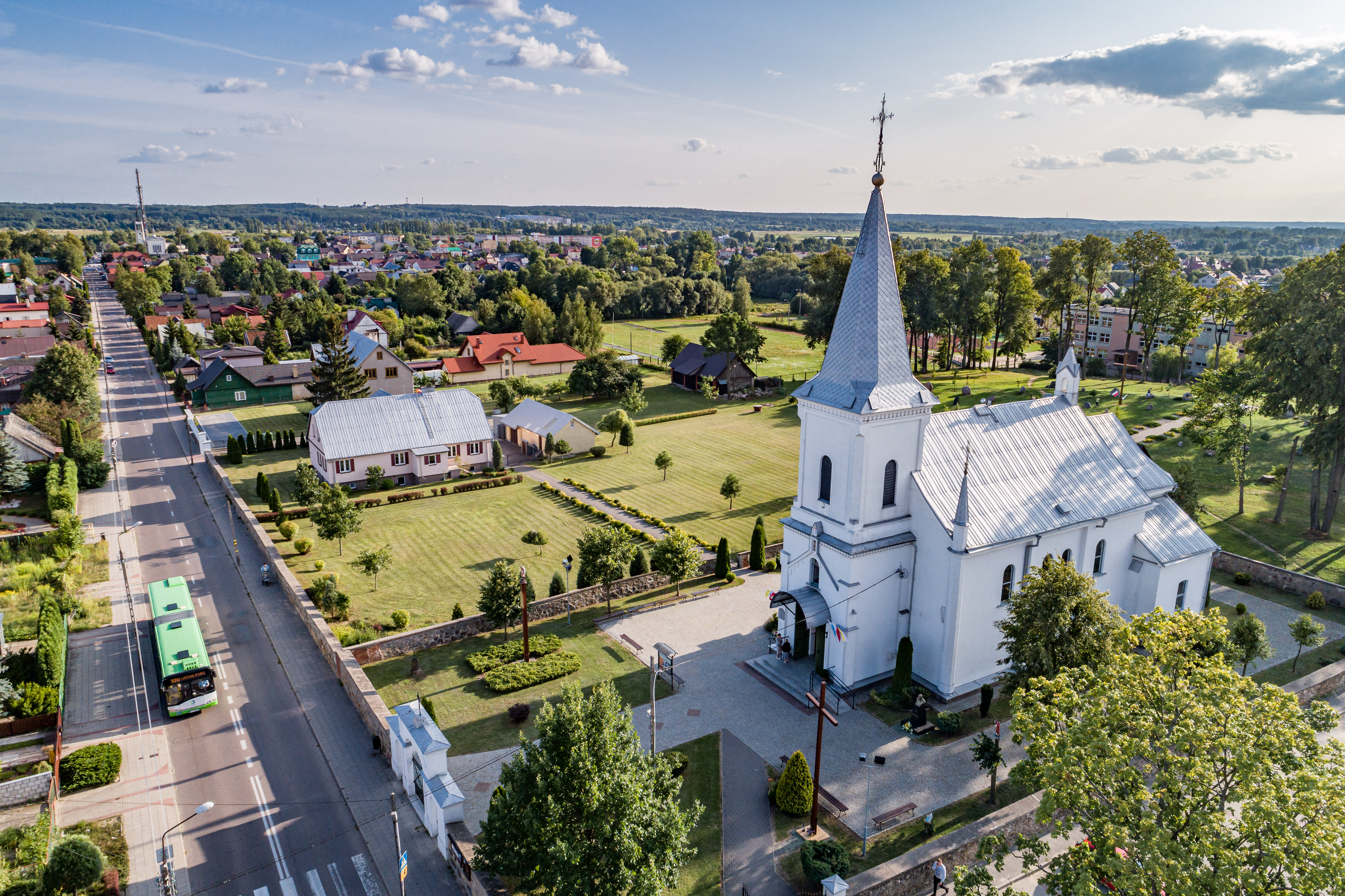
Church of Transfiguration of the Lord in Wasilków

Roman Catholic cemetery in Wasilkow

The oldest tombstones in the cemetery come from the end of the 19th century. The decor of the cemetery is rich in details of small architecture: turrets, terraces and miniatures of ancient temples. Hilly terrain with dignified old trees additionally enhances the aesthetic value of this place. In the cemetery there are seven groups of sculptures referring to the Passion and Resurrection of Jesus, two fountains and about sixty historic tombstones, the oldest of which is from 1896. There are also statues of angels, gates, balustrades and walls with engraved verses from the Holy Scriptures. At the entrance to the cemetery there is a tombstone of priest Wacław Rabczyński, who with his hard work contributed to the construction of the Church of the Blessed Virgin Mary, Mother of Mercy in 1958-1966, as well as the chapel with accompanying facilities in Święta Woda. Thanks to him, unusual cemetery sculptures were created. In 2002, the Wasilków cemetery was entered into the register of monuments. For many years.

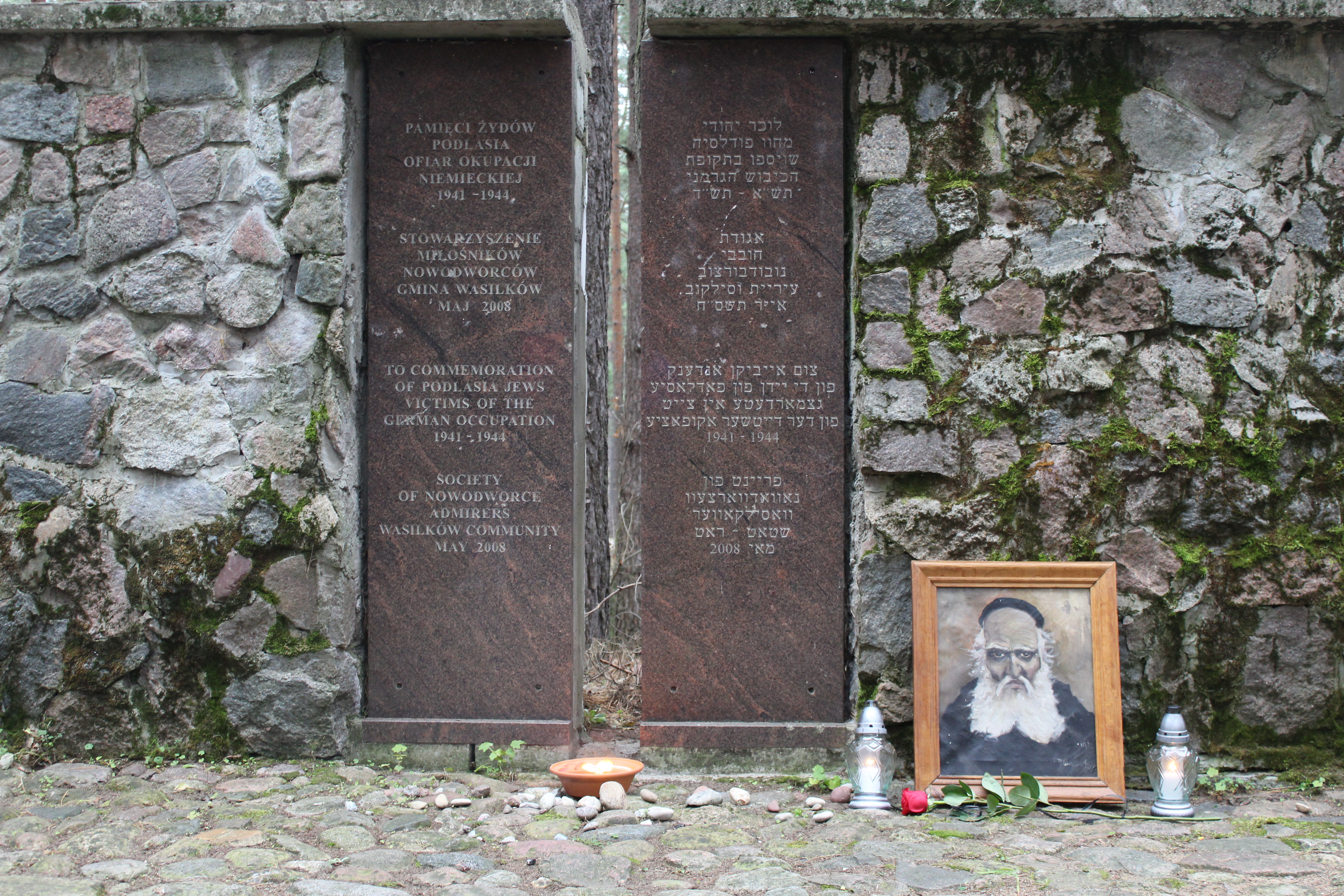
Jewish cemetery in Wasilków

Jewish cemetery in Wasilkow

It was established at the end of the 19th century. A dozen or so matzevot have survived to this day, but there are probably more of them under a thick layer of ground. Metal stars of David have been situated in the place of the entrance gate. In June 2007, a stone path and a lapidarium were made in the cemetery commemorating the Jews who lived in Wasilków before World War II. For the construction of the monument, were used found fragments of matzevot.

Sanctuary of Our Lady of Sorrows "Holy Water" in Wasilkow

On the outskirts of Wasilkow there is the "Holy Water" Sanctuary. It owes its name to the water source around which there are many legends related to healing dating back to the Middle Ages. The first documented mention of the uniqueness of this place comes from 1719, in which a man named Basil, after washing his face, regained his eyesight, which he had lost two years earlier. As a gratitude, the nobleman donated a wooden chapel, which stood over the water source. After many historical turmoil (the later brick chapel was destroyed by the Red Army during World War II), the reconstruction of this place was undertaken by priest Wacław Rabczyński in the 1950s. The chapel was completely restored, by the water source was built a grotto (similar to the one in Lourdes in France) and also there were placed seven Passion altars on the adjacent hills. After the visit to this place in 1996 by the Statue of Our Lady of Fatima, were created the Hill of Crosses and the Monument of the Third Millennium. In the same year, was established the parish under the invocation of Our Lady of Sorrows.

== Natural and tourist values ==
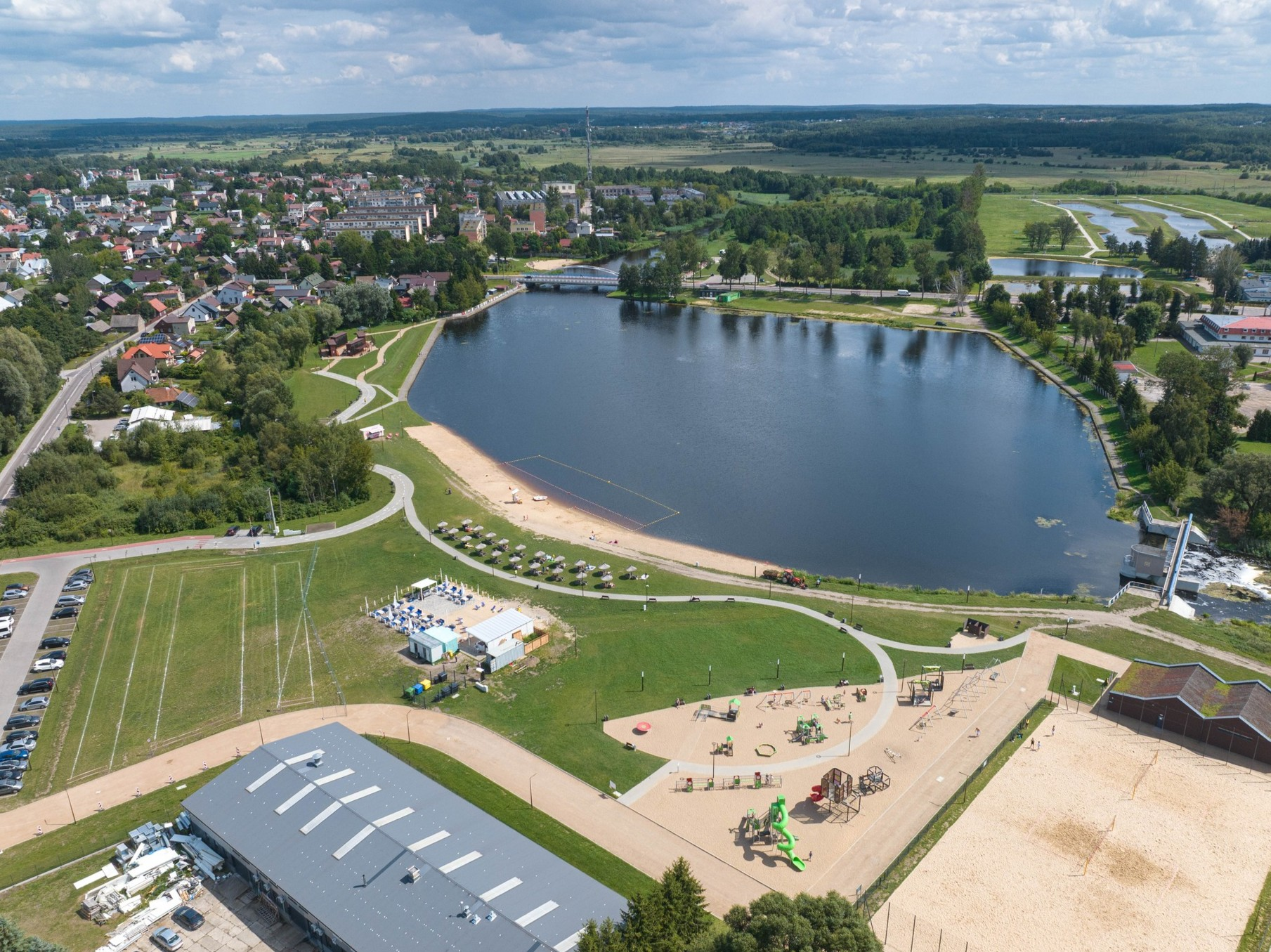
The photo shows the reservoir in Wasilków, on the reservoir there is a large municipal beach, food zone, playground, beach volleyball courts, water equipment rental and graduation tower.

The varied terrain and the Supraśl River flowing through the commune create excellent conditions for relaxation and recreation. The town is surrounded to the west, north and east by the Knyszyńska Forest Landscape Park. This allows residents and tourists to enjoy numerous hiking, cycling, and equestrian trails. For fishing enthusiasts, the Supraśl reservoir is a great place to go. Kayak and water sports equipment rentals are also available at the reservoir.

== Villages ==
Apart from the town of Wasilków, Gmina Wasilków contains the villages and settlements of Burczak, Dąbrówki, Horodnianka, Horodnianka-Kolonia, Jurowce, Jurowce-Kolonia, Katrynka, Katrynka-Leśniczówka, Mostek, Mostek-Gajówka, Nowodworce, Osowicze, Ożynnik, Podkrzemionka, Rybniki, Sielachowskie, Sochonie, Studzianki, Wólka Poduchowna, Wólka-Przedmieście, Woroszyły, Zapieczki and Zaścianek.

== Neighbouring commune ==
Wasilków commune is bordered by the Białystok city and by the commune of Czarna Białostocka, Dobrzyniewo Duże and Supraśl.

== Road and rail infrastructure ==
Through the commune goes two national roads leading to border crossings: National Road no. 8 to the border with Lithuania in Budzisko and National Road no. 19 to the border with Belarus in Kuźnica. Through the commune also goes Voivodeship Road no. 676.

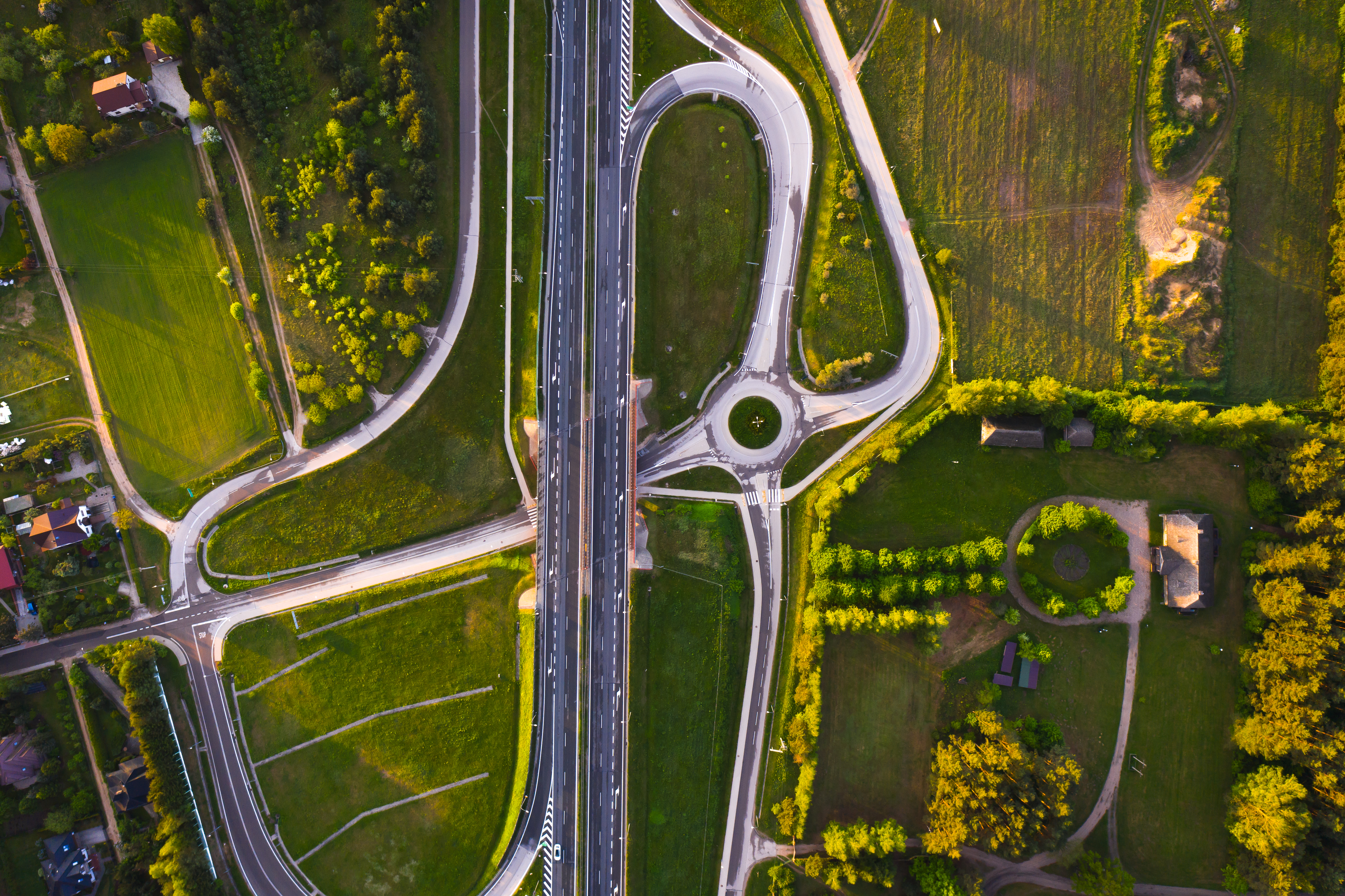
Road no 19 in Wasilków commune

Through the commune goes Railway Line no. 6 "Zielonka – Kuźnica Białostocka", Wasilków has two railway station "Wasilków" and "Wólka-Przedmieście".

== Demography ==
Data for 2024:

Demography of Wasilków commune
| Description | Total | | Woman | | Men | |
|---|---|---|---|---|---|---|
| Unit | People | % | People | % | People | % |
| Population | 21 299 | 100 | 10 881 | 51,08 | 10 418 | 48,91 |
| Population density [inhabitants/km²] | 168 | | | | | |

== Prizes and awards ==
In 2022, the Wasilków commune received three awards in the Dziennik Gazeta Prawna ranking:

- 1st place among all Polish local governments in the Local Government Communication and Promotion Leader category for the promotional film "Wasilkowska Song".
- 2nd place in Poland in the urban-rural commune category. Second place in the category of the best mayor in an urban-rural commune went to Adrian Łuckiewicz.

In 2023, the Wasilków commune received two awards in the Dziennik Gazeta Prawna ranking:

- 1st place in Poland in the urban-rural commune category.
- 1st place in the category of the best mayor in an urban-rural commune went to Adrian Łuckiewicz.

In 2024, the Wasilków commune received two awards in the Dziennik Gazeta Prawna ranking:

- 1st place in Poland in the urban-rural commune category.

In 2025, the Wasilków commune received award in the Dziennik Gazeta Prawna ranking:

- 1st place in the category of the best mayor in an urban-rural commune went to Adrian Łuckiewicz.

== Intermunicipal relationships and agreements signed with the Wasilków commune ==
- intermunicipal cooperation with the Mosty Wielkie commune (Ukraine),
- intermunicipal cooperation with the Caplani (Moldova),
- intermunicipal cooperation with the Czerwonak commune (Poland, Greater Poland Voivodeship),
- intermunicipal cooperation with the Potęgowo commune (Poland, Pomeranian Voivodeship),
- intermunicipal cooperation with the Lipnica Wielka in Orava (Poland, Lesser Poland Voivodeship).

== Sport and recreation ==
Recreational opportunities in the Wasilków commune:

- Wasilków Reservoir, Jurowiecka Street 37, Wasilków: supervised swimming area, beach, volleyball court, playground, small catering area, graduation tower,
- Unguarded beach on Nadrzeczna Street in Wasilków: horticultural garden, beach,
- Wasilków Promontory, on Białostocka Street in Wasilków: venue for numerous cultural events, playground, benches, duck feeding area,
- Unguarded beach on Dworna Street in Wasilków,
- Picnic shelter by the Yew Valley, Białostocka Street in Wasilków: picnic shelter, chess tables, barbecue area,
- Wasilków Municipal Stadium, Supraślska Street 21, Wasilków: stadium, tennis courts, outdoor gym, playground,
- "Plac Młodych Lisków" Krucza Street in Wasilków: playground, outdoor gym,
- Unguarded beach on Gajna Street in Nowodworce: beach, volleyball court,
- Playground and outdoor gym at 3 Maja Street No.7 in Nowodworce,
- "Bajeczny Zakątek" on Spacerowa Street in Sochonie: barbecue area, picnic shelters, volleyball court, stage,
- Playground and outdoor gym at the Primary School in Sochonie, Leśna Street No. 1 in Sochonie,
- Playground and outdoor gym at the Volunteer Fire Department station, Zagórna Street No. 9 in Jurowce,
- Playground and outdoor gym at the community center and Volunteer Fire Department station, Wesoła Street No. 7 in Dąbrówki,
- Playground and outdoor gym at the community center, Podleśna Street No. 3 in Studzianki,
- Playground, outdoor gym with shelter at the community center (plot no. 319) in the village of Wólka Przedmieście.

There are 7 Community Centers in Wasilków commune:

- Dąbrówki, Wesoła Street No. 7
- Jurowce, Zagórna Street No. 6
- Nowodworce, 3 Maja Street No.5
- Osowicze Street No. 25
- Rybniki Street No. 1
- Studzianki, Podleśna Street No. 3
- Sochonie, Kościelna Street No. 1
