= Ożynnik =

- Village
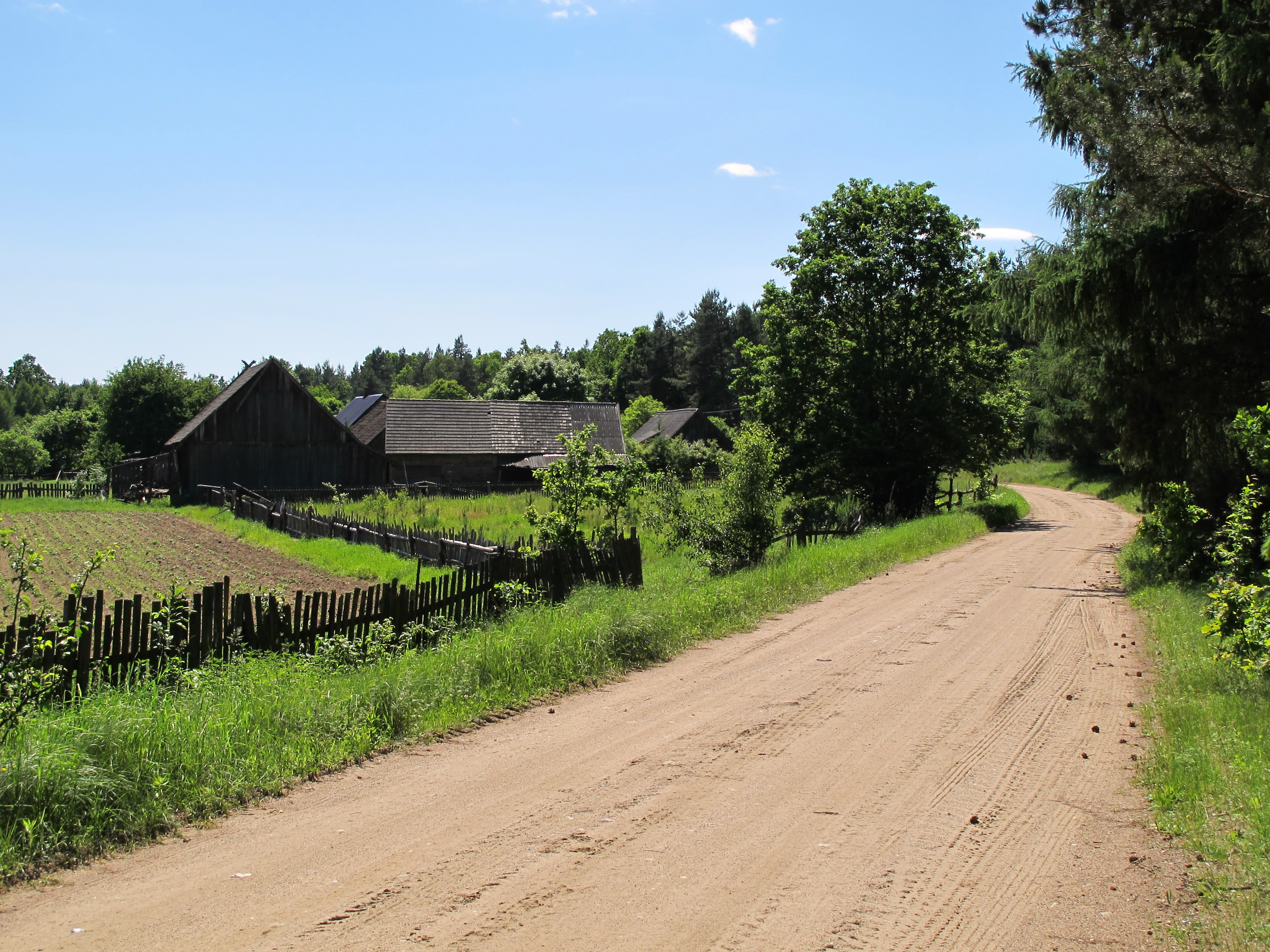
- Houses by the unpaved road in Ożynnik

- Location within Poland
- Coordinates: 53°15′5.46″N 23°18′29.07″E
- Country: Poland
- Voivodeship: Podlaskie
- County: Białystok
- Gmina: Wasilków

Ożynnik [ɔˈʐɨɲːik] is a village in the administrative district of Gmina Wasilków, within Białystok County, Podlaskie Voivodeship, in north-eastern Poland.
