= Zaścianek, Podlaskie Voivodeship =

Zaścianek
- Village
- Location within Poland
- Coordinates: 53°14′50″N 23°18′08″E
- Country: Poland
- Voivodeship: Podlaskie
- County: Białystok
- Gmina: Wasilków

Zaścianek [zaɕˈt͡ɕanɛk] is a village in the administrative district of Gmina Wasilków, within Białystok County, Podlaskie Voivodeship, in north-eastern Poland.
