= Council of State of the Polish People's Republic =

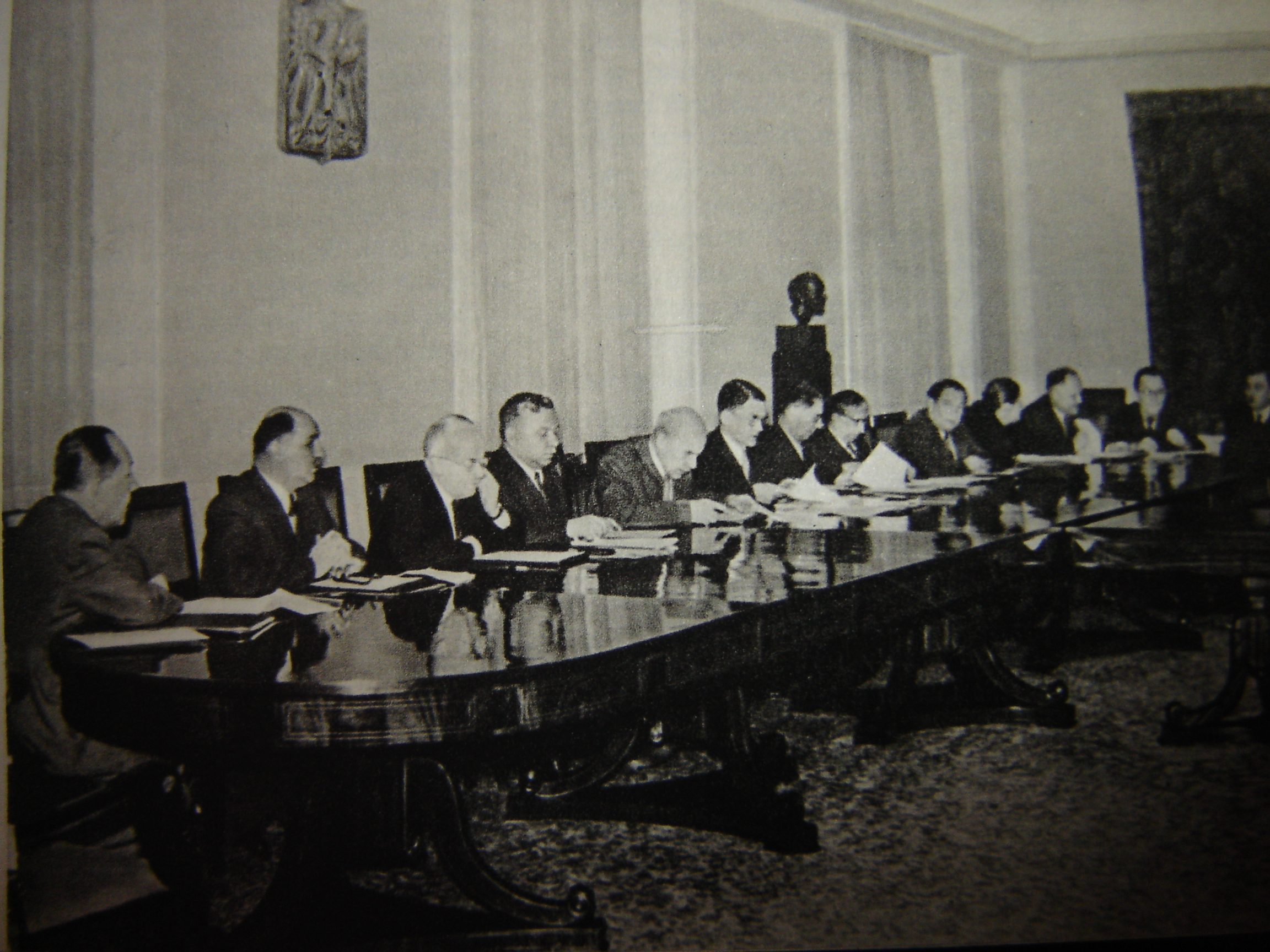
A meeting of the Council of State in 1964

The Council of State of the Polish People's Republic (Polish: Rada Państwa) was the standing organ of the Sejm. It was introduced by the Small Constitution of 1947 as an organ of executive power. The Council of State consisted of the President of the Republic of Poland as chairman, the Marshal and Vice-marshals of the Sejm, President of the Supreme Audit Office, and potential other members. The Council of State had the power to approve decrees issued by the Council of Ministers, exercise supreme control over the local national councils, approve promulgation of laws concerning the budget and military draft, declare a state of emergency and martial law, initiate legislation, and others.

Under the 1952 Constitution of the Polish People's Republic, the office of the President of Poland was eliminated and the Council of State became a collective head of state organ. According to Article 29 of the constitution, the Council of State consisted of seventeen people: the chairman, four deputy chairmen, the secretary, and eleven other members. All were elected by the Sejm from its members during the parliament's first session after elections. They were usually chosen from the deputies representing the Polish United Workers' Party (PZPR), although occasionally deputies from PZPR's satellite parties, United People's Party (ZSL) and Alliance of Democrats (SD) were elected. In practice, the council (and the Polish state) was often represented by its chairman, who may have been referred to as the president of Poland by foreign representatives. The council ratified or renounced international agreements, appointed and recalled representatives of Poland to other states and to international organizations; it conferred orders and had the power of pardon. Some of its other constitutional functions were:

- calling elections to the Sejm and convening its sessions,
- issuing decrees during periods between Sejm sessions (the decrees had to be later accepted by the Sejm),
- initiating legislation,
- determining binding interpretations of Sejm statues.

When the Sejm was not in session (in practice, for most of the year), the Council of State had the power to issue decrees that had the force of law. These decrees had to be approved by the Sejm at its next session. Due to the principles of democratic centralism, however, such approvals were usually a mere formality.

The Council of State institution was eliminated on 19 July 1989 by a constitutional amendment. Some of its functions were transferred to the reestablished office of the President of Poland.

== Chairmen of the Council of State ==
No.	Name	Portrait	Term	Political party
1	Bolesław Bierut (1892–1956)		20 February 1947 – 20 November 1952	PZPR
2	Aleksander Zawadzki (1899–1964)		20 November 1952 – 7 August 1964	PZPR
—	Vacant (Deputy Chairmen Edward Ochab, Oskar R. Lange, Bolesław Podedworny and Stanisław Kulczyński served together as Acting Chairman)		7 August 1964 – 12 August 1964	PZPR (Ochab and Lange), ZSL (Podedworny), SD (Kulczyński)
3	Edward Ochab (1906–1989)		12 August 1964 – 11 April 1968	PZPR
4	Marian Spychalski (1906–1980)		11 April 1968 – 23 December 1970	PZPR
5	Józef Cyrankiewicz (1911–1989)		23 December 1970 – 28 March 1972	PZPR
6	Henryk Jabłoński (1909–2003)		28 March 1972 – 6 November 1985	PZPR
7	Wojciech Jaruzelski (1923–2014)		6 November 1985 – 19 July 1989	PZPR

== See also ==
- List of deputy chairmen of the Polish Council of State
- Presidium of the Supreme Soviet of the Soviet Union of the Soviet Union, a similar institution
