= Tomasz Orłowski =

Polish politician

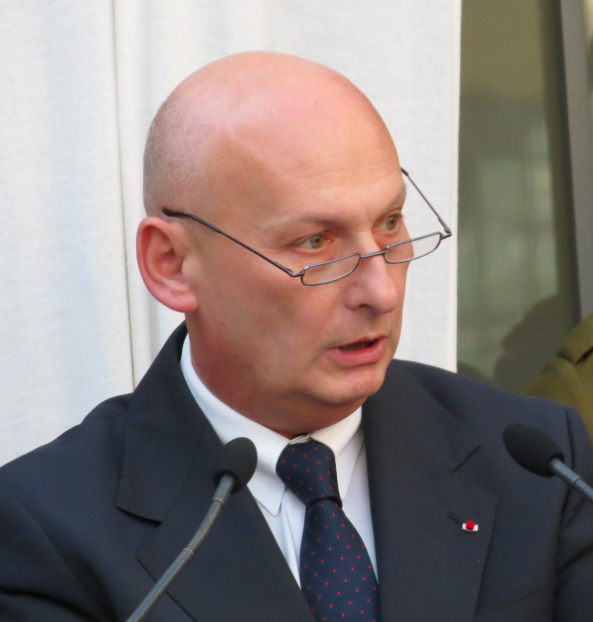
- Tomasz Orłowski (2013)

Poland Ambassador to France
- In office 2007–2014
- Preceded by: Jan Tombiński
- Succeeded by: Andrzej Byrt

Poland Ambassador to Italy
- In office 2015–2017
- Preceded by: Wojciech Ponikiewski
- Succeeded by: Konrad Głębocki

Personal details
- Born: 1 August 1956 (age 70) Łódź, Poland
- Education: Nicolaus Copernicus University in Toruń; University of Łódź
- Profession: Diplomat, official, historian, university teacher

Tomasz Hubert Orłowski (born 1 August 1956, in Łódź) is a Polish diplomat, official, historian, university teacher, serving as Undersecretary of State in the Ministry of Foreign Affairs (2014-). He has previously served as ambassador to France (2007–2014), and Italy (2015–2017).

== Life ==
Orłowski graduated in Archaeology and Art history from the Nicolaus Copernicus University in Toruń and University of Łódź. He was educated also at the University of Poitiers (Ph.D.), Salzburg Global Seminar (1995), Institut des hautes études de défense nationale in Paris (1995). In 1980s, he was university teacher of the University of Wrocław. In later years, he taught at the Polish Institute of Diplomacy, and the National School of Public Administration, Paris School of International Affairs, among others.

Member of the Jacques Delors Institute, and Académie des Sciences Morales et Politiques.

In 1990, he started his diplomatic career as the First Secretary and Counselor at the Embassy of Poland in Paris. From 1994 to 1996, he was deputy director of the Department of Europe of the Ministry of Foreign Affairs. Between 1996 and 2001, he was deputy ambassador at the Embassy of Poland in Rome. From 2001 to 2004, he was secretary general of the Polish National Commission for UNESCO, and from 2004 to 2005, deputy director of the MFA Department of the United Nations System and Global Problems. In 2005, he was promoted director of the MFA Diplomatic Protocol.

In 2007, Orłowski was appointed ambassador to France, accredited also to Monaco. In 2010, he was extraordinarily summoned to Poland to organize the funeral ceremony of President Lech Kaczyński and the inauguration ceremony of President Bronisław Komorowski. In 2014, he ended his mission in France and was nominated Undersecretary of State in the Ministry of Foreign Affairs responsible for development cooperation, Eastern and Asian Policy. From March 2015 to 31 August 2017, he served as ambassador to Italy, accredited also to San Marino. Until 2021 he was lecturer at the MFA Diplomatic Academy. On 23 January 2025, he returned to the diplomatic service and became Chargé d'affaires of the Embassy in Rabat, Morocco, accredited also to Mauritania.

== Private Life ==
Brother of economist Witold Orłowski. Married with two daughters.

Besides his native Polish, he speaks English, French, Italian, German, Spanish, and Russian.

== Honours ==
- 1997 – Grand Officer of the Order of Merit, Portugal
- 1997 – Commander of the Order of Merit of the Italian Republic, Italy
- 2004 – Commander of the Order of the Three Stars, Latvia
- 2005 – Bronze Gloria Artis Medal for Merit to Culture, Poland
- 2006 – Grand Officer of the Order of the Star of Italian Solidarity, Italy
- 2012 – Commander of the Order of Saint Charles, Monaco
- 2013 – Commander of the Legion of Honour, France
- 2017 - Cittadino Onorario della Città di Scalea in Italia
- 2022 – Commander of the Order of Arts and Letters, France
- Gold Medal of Merit for National Defence, Poland
- Grand Officer of the National Order of Merit, France
- Grand Officer of the Order of Merit of the Federal Republic of Germany, Germany
- Grand Officer of the Order pro Merito Melitensi, Sovereign Military Order of Malta

== Works ==
- Orłowski, Tomasz (2005). Protokół dyplomatyczny: ceremoniał & etykieta. Warszawa: Akademia Dyplomatyczna Ministerstwa Spraw Zagranicznych. ISBN 978-83-919743-8-4.
- Orłowski, Tomasz; Szteliga, Andrzej (2012). Etykieta menedżera. Katowice: Wydawnictwo Sonia Draga. ISBN 978-83-7508-538-9.
- Orłowski, Tomasz (2015). Protokół dyplomatyczny: między tradycją a nowoczesnością. Warszawa: Polski Instytut Spraw Międzynarodowych. ISBN 978-83-64895-71-5.
- Orłowski, Tomasz Hubert (2020). Nasz zakochany przewodnik po Francji czyli Dyplomatyczna ratatouille (Wydanie I ed.). Poznań: Dom Wydawniczy REBIS. ISBN 978-83-8188-028-2.
- Orłowski, Tomasz (2021). Majestat Rzeczypospolitej: ceremonie publiczne i uroczystości państwowe w stulecie odrodzenia Polski. Warszawa: Polski Instytut Spraw Międzynarodowych. ISBN 978-83-66091-79-5.
- Orłowski, Tomasz (2024). Praktyka dyplomatyczna (Wydanie II rozszerzone ed.). Warszawa: Polski Instytut Spraw Międzynarodowych. ISBN 978-83-67487-52-8.
- Orłowski, Tomasz (2024). Dyplomatyczna ratatouille: dokładka (Wydanie I ed.). Poznań: Dom Wydawniczy Rebis. ISBN 978-83-8338-068-1.

Translations

- Jean, Carlo (2003). Geopolityka. Dylematy. Translated by Orłowski, Tomasz; Pawłowska, Justyna. Wrocław: Zakład Narodowy im. Ossolińskich. ISBN 978-83-04-04650-4.
