= List of ambassadors of Poland to France =

Coordinates: 48.858889°N 2.315556°E

Poland Ambassador to France
- Ambasador Rzeczypospolitej Polskiej we Francji
- Coat of arms of Poland
- Style: Mr. Ambassador (informal); His Excellency (diplomatic)
- Reports to: Polish Ministry of Foreign Affairs
- Appointer: President of Poland
- Term length: No fixed term
- Inaugural holder: Hieronymus Łaski
- Formation: 1524
- Website: Embassy of Poland, France

The Republic of Poland ambassador to France is the official representative of the Government of Poland to the Government of France.

The embassy is located at 1 rue de Talleyrand in Paris. In addition there is Consulate General in Lyon.

== List of ambassadors ==
Diplomatic agrément/Diplomatic accreditation	Ambassador	Observations	List of heads of state of Poland	List of presidents of France	Term end
1524	Hieronymus Łaski		Sigismund I the Old	Francis I of France	
1713	Burchard von Suhm		Augustus II the Strong	Louis XIV	1720
1757	Jean-Baptiste d'Aloy		Augustus III of Poland	Louis XV	
1762	Franciszek Bieliński		Augustus III of Poland	Louis XV	
1766	Feliks Franciszek Łoyko		Stanisław August Poniatowski	Louis XV	
1769	Charles de Saint-Pol		Stanisław August Poniatowski	Louis XV	
1769	Joachim Chreptowicz		Stanisław August Poniatowski	Louis XV	1770
1772	Franciszek Ksawery Branicki		Stanisław August Poniatowski	Louis XV	1773
1777	Pierre-Maurice Glayre		Stanisław August Poniatowski	Louis XVI	
April 16, 1919	Erazm Piltz	government officials	Józef Piłsudski	Raymond Poincaré	June 1, 1919
August 1, 1919	Maurycy Klemens Zamoyski	envoy	Józef Piłsudski	Raymond Poincaré	January 19, 1924
August 22, 1924	Alfred Chłapowski	envoy	Stanisław Wojciechowski	Gaston Doumergue	November 26, 1924
November 27, 1924	Alfred Chłapowski		Stanisław Wojciechowski	Gaston Doumergue	June 20, 1936
June 20, 1936	Juliusz Łukasiewicz		Ignacy Mościcki	Albert Lebrun	November 7, 1939
November 1, 1939	Feliks Frankowski	Chargé d'affaires	Bolesław Wieniawa-Długoszowski	Albert Lebrun	April 1, 1940
April 1, 1943	Feliks Frankowski	Chargé d'affaires	Władysław Raczkiewicz	Philippe Pétain	September 4, 1943
September 14, 1943	Kajetan Morawski		Władysław Raczkiewicz	Philippe Pétain	July 5, 1945
December 17, 1944	Stefan Jędrychowski		Bolesław Bierut	Charles de Gaulle	September 22, 1945
September 22, 1945	Stanisław Skrzeszewski		Bolesław Bierut	Charles de Gaulle	June 17, 1947
June 17, 1947	Jerzy Putrament		Bolesław Bierut	Vincent Auriol	April 6, 1954
July 10, 1952	Przemysław Ogrodziński	Chargé d'affaires	Aleksander Zawadzki	Vincent Auriol	
April 6, 1954	Stanisław Gajewski		Aleksander Zawadzki	René Coty	June 24, 1961
June 24, 1961	Jan Druto		Aleksander Zawadzki	Charles de Gaulle	July 3, 1969
July 3, 1969	Tadeusz Olechowski		Marian Spychalski	Alain Poher	April 2, 1972
April 2, 1972	Emil Wojtaszek		Henryk Jabłoński	Georges Pompidou	April 28, 1976
April 28, 1976	Tadeusz Olechowski		Henryk Jabłoński	Valéry Giscard d’Estaing	November 20, 1980
November 20, 1980	Eugeniusz Kułaga		Henryk Jabłoński	Valéry Giscard d’Estaing	December 7, 1984
December 7, 1984	Janusz Stefanowicz		Henryk Jabłoński	François Mitterrand	November 17, 1988
November 17, 1988	Ryszard Fijałkowski		Wojciech Jaruzelski	François Mitterrand	January 9, 1991
January 9, 1991	Jerzy Łukaszewski		Lech Wałęsa	François Mitterrand	September 4, 1996
September 4, 1996	Stefan Meller		Aleksander Kwaśniewski	Jacques Chirac	January 31, 2001
February 1, 2001	Sławomir Czarlewski	Chargé d'affaires	Aleksander Kwaśniewski	Jacques Chirac	May 13, 2001
April 9, 2001	Jan Tombiński		Aleksander Kwaśniewski	Jacques Chirac	December 28, 2006
December 28, 2006	Ludwik Wdowik	Chargé d'affaires	Lech Kaczyński	Jacques Chirac	September 14, 2007
September 14, 2007	Tomasz Orłowski		Lech Kaczyński	Nicolas Sarkozy	August 31, 2014
September 15, 2014	Marta Stachowiak	Chargé d'affaires	Bronisław Komorowski	François Hollande	January 7, 2015
January 7, 2015	Andrzej Byrt		Bronisław Komorowski	François Hollande	August 31, 2016
September 1, 2016	Dariusz Wiśniewski	Chargé d'affaires	Andrzej Duda	François Hollande	August 11, 2017
August 12, 2017	Tomasz Młynarski		Andrzej Duda	Emmanuel Macron	March 31, 2022
April 2022	Jan Emeryk Rościszewski		Andrzej Duda	Emmanuel Macron	February 2026

== See also ==
- List of ambassadors of France to Poland
