= Wojciech Ponikiewski =

Polish diplomat (born 1963)

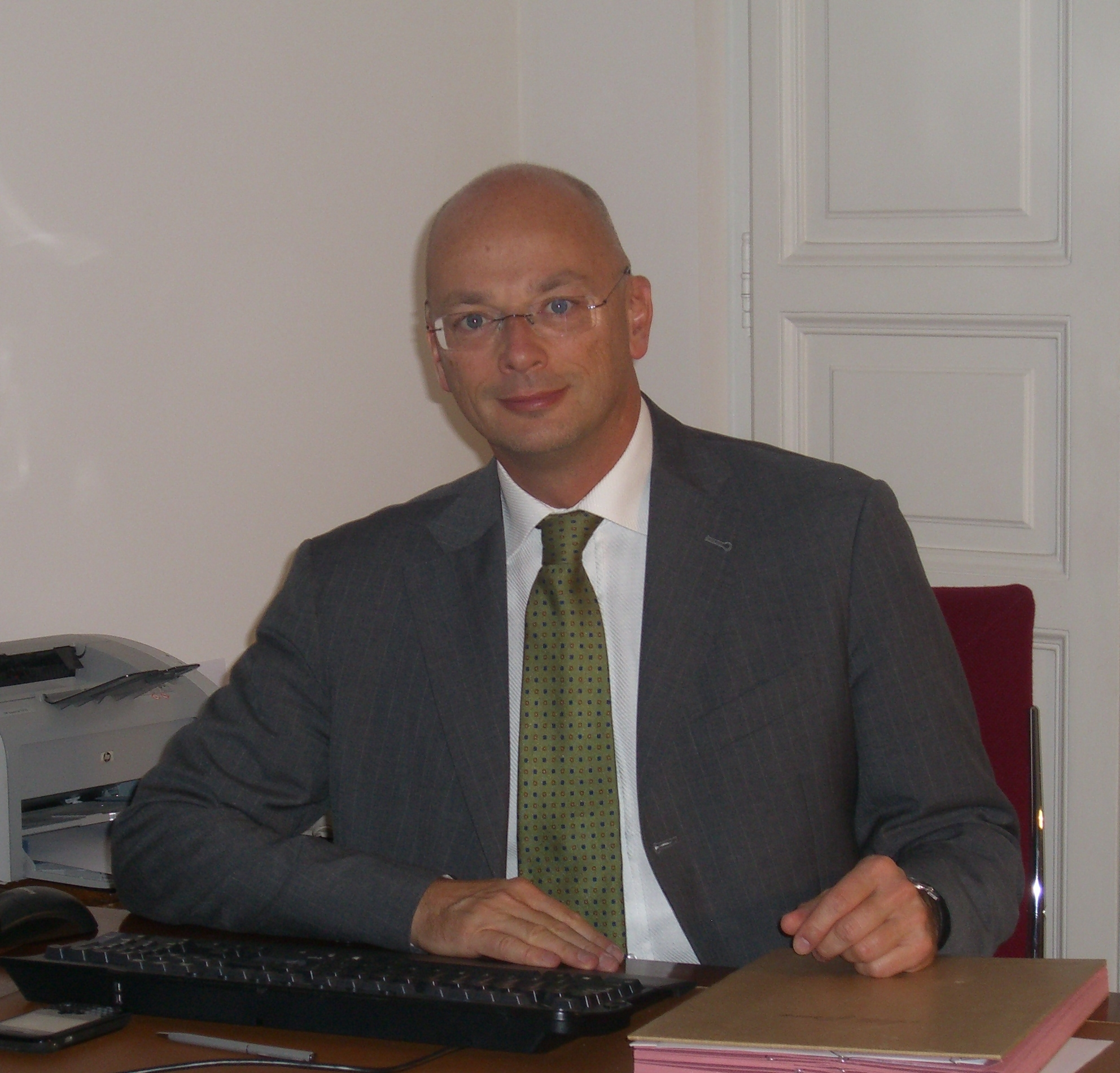
- Wojciech Ponikiewski (2011)

Poland Ambassador to Italy
- In office 2010–2015
- Appointed by: Bronisław Komorowski
- Preceded by: Jerzy Chmielewski
- Succeeded by: Tomasz Orłowski

Personal details
- Born: 9 March 1963 (age 63) Rabat
- Parent(s): Augustyn Ponikiewski; Anna Ostrowska
- Education: Poznań University of Economics and Business
- Profession: Diplomat

Wojciech Tomasz Ponikiewski (born 9 March 1963 in Rabat) is a Polish diplomat, ambassador to Italy (2010–2015).

== Life ==
In 1986, Ponikiewski received master's degree at the Poznań University of Economics and Business. He was educated also in European integration at the European University Centre of the Nancy 2 University and in development economics at the Catholic University of Leuven.

In 1990, he joined the Ministry of Foreign Affairs (MFA). Until 1995, he worked at the Permanent Mission of the Republic of Poland to the United Nations in New York. Between 1995 and 1997, he worked for the United Nations Secretariat in New York and the United Nations Environment Programme in Nairobi. Next, on behalf of the Polish government he was chief negotiator of the Kyoto Protocol, and from 1998 to 2001, director of the MFA Department of United Nations. Between 2001 and 2008, he served as deputy chief of mission at the Embassy in Rome, from July 2007 to January 2008, he was heading it as chargé d'affaires). In 2008, he took the post of director of the Department of Foreign Economic Policy, and in December 2009, of the Department of the Americas. On 30 November 2010, he was appointed Ambassador to Italy. He was accredited also to San Marino, and, until 30 November 2014, to Malta. He ended his mission in Rome on 31 January 2015. Next, he was director of the MFA Department of United Nations and Human Rights (until February 2016), deputy director and acting head of the Department of Economic Cooperation. Since November 2024, he is heading the Embassy in Athens as chargé d'affaires.

Child of Augustyn Ponikiewski and Anna née Ostrowska.

== Works ==
- Ponikiewski, Wojciech (2009). Rzym i jego czarna arystokracja: spacerownik historyczny. Biblioteka Gazety Wyborczej (in Polish). Warszawa: Agora. ISBN 978-83-7552-710-0.
