= Jan Tombiński =

Polish diplomat

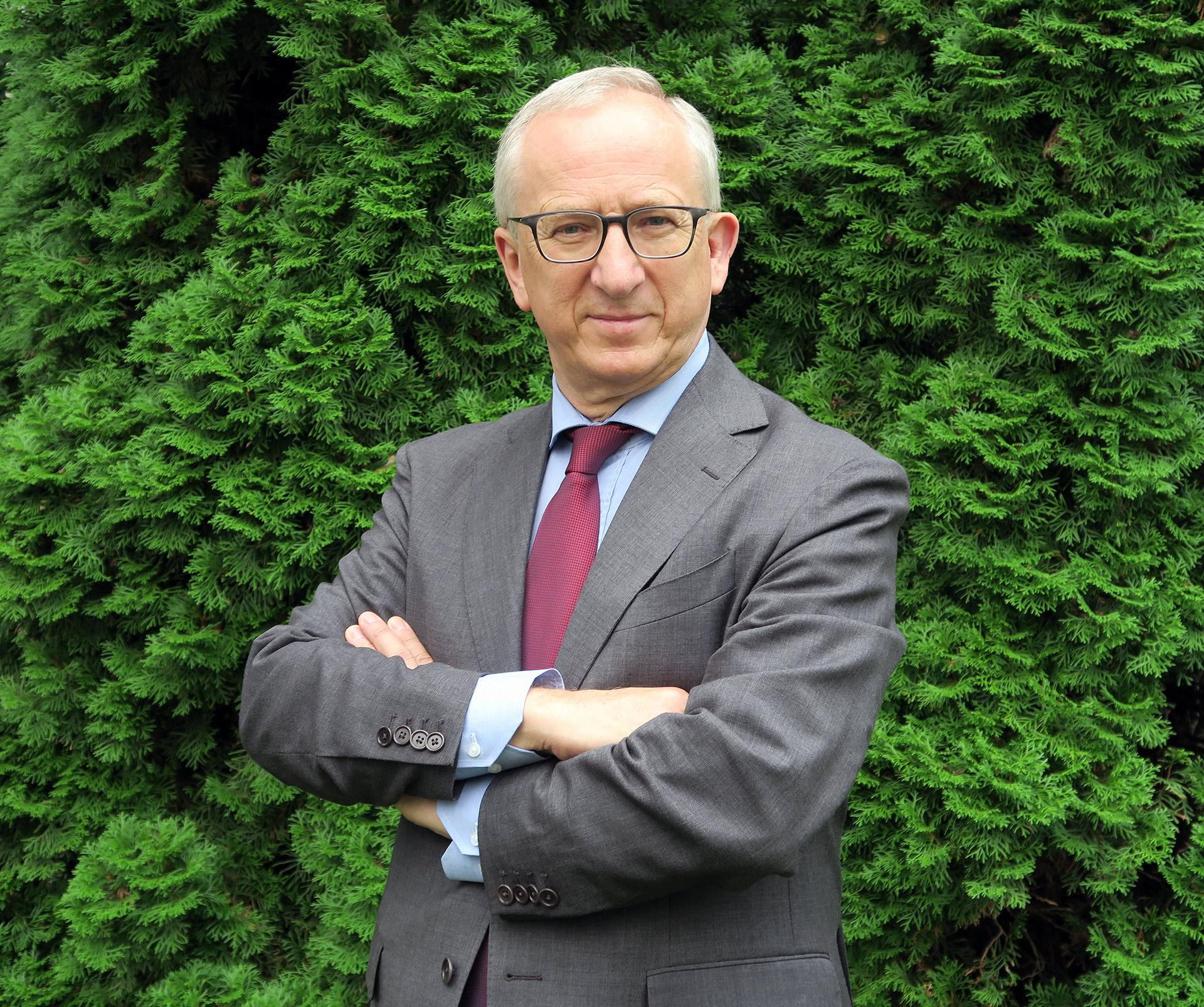
- Jan Tombiński (2024)

1st Poland Ambassador to Slovenia
- In office 1996–1998
- Succeeded by: Maciej Szymański

Poland Ambassador to France
- In office 9 April 2001 – 28 December 2006
- Preceded by: Stefan Meller
- Succeeded by: Tomasz Orłowski

5th Poland Ambassador to the European Union
- In office 1 February 2007 – 31 August 2012
- Preceded by: Marek Grela
- Succeeded by: Marek Prawda

European Union Ambassador to Ukraine
- In office 2012–2016
- Preceded by: José Manuel Pinto Teixeira
- Succeeded by: Hugues Mingarelli

European Union Ambassador to the Holy See
- In office 2016 – 28 August 2020
- Preceded by: Laurence Argimon-Pistre
- Succeeded by: Alexandra Valkenburg

Personal details
- Born: October 4, 1958 (age 68) Kraków
- Spouse: Agnieszka Tombińska
- Children: 10
- Education: Jagiellonian University
- Profession: Diplomat

Jan Tadeusz Tombiński (born 4 October 1958, Kraków) is a Polish historian and diplomat, Poland ambassador to Slovenia (1996–1998), France (2001–2006), permanent representative to the European Union (2007–2012), and EU ambassador to Ukraine (2012–2016) and the Holy See (2016–2020).

== Life ==
Tombiński in his youth, he was practicing fencing. In 1978, he was Poland junior vice champion in foil. He received his Master titles from German studies (1984) and history (1985) at the Jagiellonian University, Kraków. Shortly after graduation he was employed by the university library, since 1987 he was lecturer at the Jagiellonian University Institute of History.

During 1980s, he was active member of Poland dissident movement. Between 1981 and 1984 he was deputy head of the Jagiellonian University Independent Students’ Association. For a short period of time he was there head of the students' union. He was also editor of the illegal self-publishing magazines.

In 1990, Tombiński joined the Ministry of Foreign Affairs. He began his career as the Third Secretary at the embassy in Prague. In 1995, he was posted at the newly formed embassy in Ljubljana, following year being nominated ambassador to Slovenia, accredited also to Bosnia and Herzegovina. From 1998 to 2001 he was director of the MFA Department of Europe. Later, he was ambassador to France (2001–2006) and permanent representative to the European Union (2007–2012). Later, he joined the European External Action Service, serving as an EU ambassador to Ukraine (2012–2016) and the Holy See (2016–2020). From 2022 he served as EU High Level Advisers in the Republic of Moldova. On 20 August 2024, he took the post of Chargé d'affaires of Poland to Germany.

Besides Polish, Tombiński speaks English, German, French, Slovene, Czech, Italian and Ukrainian. He is married to Agnieszka Tombińska, with ten children.

== Honours ==
- Commander of the Order of Polonia Restituta, Poland, 2012
- Officer of the Ordre des Arts et des Lettres, France, 2005

== Works ==
- Hitler and the Swiss neutrality 1933–35, Kraków 1989
- Austria and European integration 1926–32, Graz 1989
- Debate on the project of the European Union in the League of Nations, Kraków 1991
- The response of Austria to the Briand Plan, Genewa 1994
- The Polish election law, Praga 1992
- Polish-German Relations 1945–1991, Praga 1994
- Poland – six months after the elections, Bonn 1989
- Polish television towards choice, Stuttgart 1990
