= Jan Emeryk Rościszewski =

Polish manager

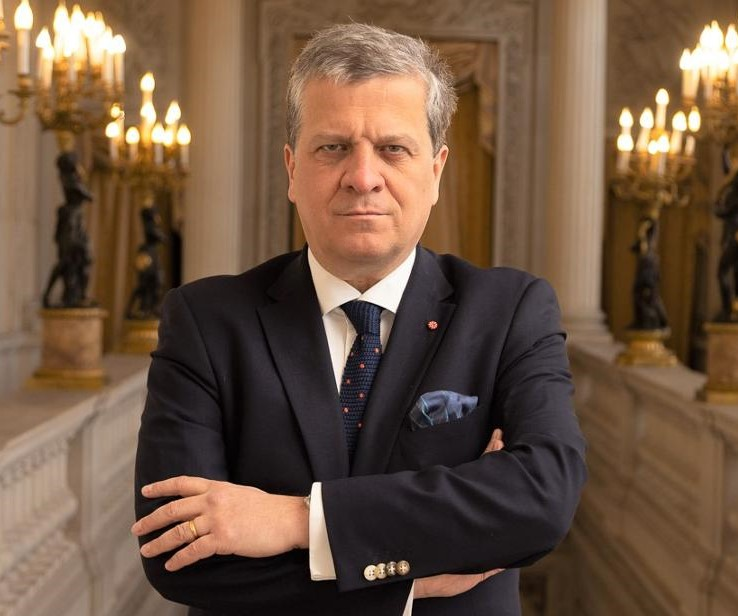
- Jan Emeryk Rościszewski (2022)

Poland Ambassador to France
- In office April 2022 – February 2026
- Appointed by: Andrzej Duda
- President: Emmanuel Macron
- Preceded by: Tomasz Młynarski

Personal details
- Born: 4 June 1965 (age 61) Warsaw, Poland
- Spouse: Anna Rościszewska
- Children: 4
- Parent(s): Marcin Rościszewski, Elżbieta Mańkowska
- Education: Catholic University of Lublin, Sciences Po
- Profession: Business executive, diplomat

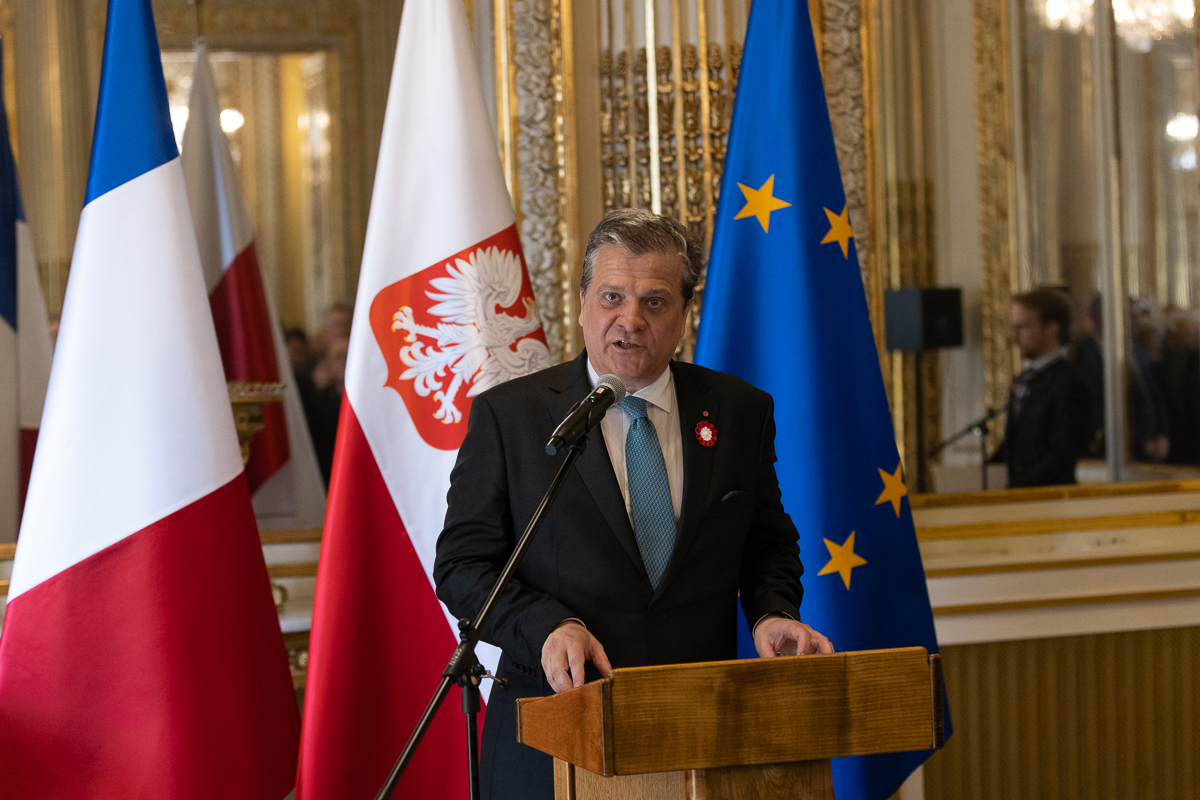
Jan Emeryk Rościszewski (2022)

Jan Emeryk Rościszewski (born 4 June 1965 in Warsaw) is a Polish business executive, diplomat and Poland's ambassador to France from 2022 to 2026. Previously, he served as the Chairman of the Management Board of PKO Bank Polski in 2021.

== Education and career ==
Rościszewski started his studies at the University of Warsaw. In 1988, he graduated from history at the Catholic University of Lublin. In 1990, he received DEA diploma from the Sciences Po, Paris. In 1996, he became a certified insurance broker.

Since 1990s he has been working in France in the fields of banking and insurance for AXA and Groupe Azur, being the member of the board of the latter one. Since 1996 Rościszewski has been working for insurance company Cardif Polska (BNP Paribas Group), two years later becoming the Chairman of the management board of Cardif Polska. He took the post until 2016. He was also the chairman or vice-president of the supervisory board of, among others, Pocztylion Arka PTE, the Postal Financial Services Agency, and Bank Pocztowy (since 2017), the Polish Chamber of Insurance (2012–2016). In 2016, he became vice-president of the Board of the PKO Bank Polski, largest Polish bank. He was responsible for the Retail Market Segment of 11 million clients. At the same time he was holding positions in the supervisory boards of the PKO Bank Polski's Capital Group companies: PKO Leasing, PKO Faktoring, PKO Bank Hipoteczny, PKO TFI, PKO Towarzystwo Ubezpieczeń and PKO Życie Towarzystwo Ubezpieczeń. Between June and October 2021 he was President of the management board of PKO Bank Polski. He was nominated ambassador to France in March 2022, and took the office following month. He finished his term in February 2026.

== Public life ==
During the period of martial law in Poland (1981–1983) he was cooperating with the Primate's Committee in Aid of People Deprived of Freedom and their Families. He was also distributing underground publications.

In 1990s he was member of the Centre Agreement political party. In 2009, Rościszewski became a Knight of Honour and Devotion of the Order of Malta, and in December 2012, he became a Hospitaller of the Polish Association of the Knights of Malta.

He has been publishing on finances, insurances, pension system, healthcare system in Rzeczpospolita, Gazeta Wyborcza, Le Figaro, Le Point, and Harvard Business Review.

== Private life ==
Jan Emeryk Rościszewski is the son of geographer Marcin Rościszewski and his wife Elżbieta Mańkowska. His father came from an aristocratic family, with roots in the Polish region of Mazovia.

He is married to Anna Rościszewska and has four children. Besides Polish, he speaks French, English, and basic Russian.

== Honours ==
- 2010 – Officer's Cross of the Order of Polonia Restituta
- 2015 – Bene Merito honorary badge
