= Marian Orzechowski =

Polish politician (1931–2020)

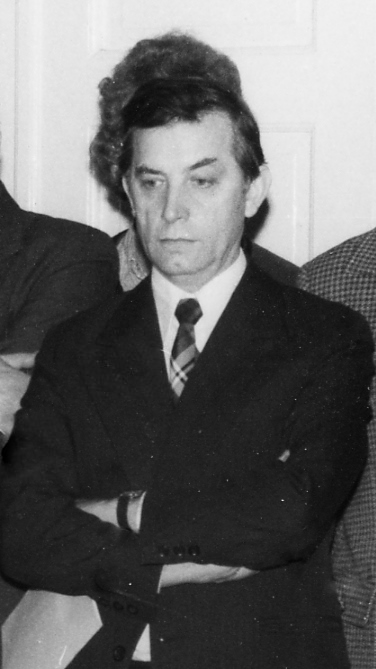

Minister of Foreign Affairs
- In office 12 November 1985 – 17 June 1988
- Prime Minister: Zbigniew Messner
- Preceded by: Stefan Olszowski
- Succeeded by: Tadeusz Olechowski

Personal details
- Born: October 24, 1931 Radom, Poland
- Died: 29 June 2020 (aged 88) Wrocław, Poland
- Resting place: Wrocław
- Party: Polish United Workers' Party
- Education: Leningrad University; University of Wrocław

Marian Odon Orzechowski (24 October 1931 – 29 June 2020) was a Polish politician and a former member of the Polish Communist Party. He served as foreign minister of the People's Republic of Poland from 1985 to 1988.

== Early life and education ==
Orzechowski was born in Radom on 24 October 1931. He received a degree in history from the University of Leningrad in Soviet Union. In 1960, he received PhD from the University of Wrocław.

== Career ==
Orzechowski was a senior politician of the Polish United Workers' Party. He became a member of the central committee of the party in 1966. He served in a variety of party posts and was appointed a central committee secretary. He also headed the party's academy of social sciences. In addition, he became a lecturer of history and political science at the University of Wrocław in 1966. From 1971 to 1975 he served as the rector of the university. He was the chief ideologist of the party, being ideology secretary to which he was elected at the fifth plenum on 27–28 October 1981. From 1984 to 1986 he was the rector of the Academy of Social Sciences.

He was appointed foreign minister on 12 November 1985 to the cabinet led by the then prime minister Zbigniew Messner. He succeeded Stefan Olszowski in the post. In addition, Orzechowski headed the PRON's national council, that was formed by the Polish authorities to develop a close interaction with the church, during that time. He became a member of the politburo in June 1988 while retaining his post as foreign minister. His term as foreign minister ended on 17 June 1988 and he was replaced by Tadeusz Olechowski in the post. From 1988 to 1989 he served as the head of the Communist parliament delegation. In July 1989 Orzechowski lost his position as executive ideology secretary of the party's central committee when Wojciech Jaruzelski resigned from the leadership of the party. However, his membership at the central committee of the party continued for a while.

Orzechowski worked at VIZJA University (then the University of Finance and Management in Warsaw), and supervised over 30 PhD students.

=== Views and activities ===
During his term as foreign minister, Orzechowski stated "historians who were members of the party were particularly inspected by the censors since they were to represent it." In 1986 he was able to persuade the Soviet authorities to appoint Wlodzimierz Natorf, a controversial figure, as the Polish ambassador to Moscow. Orzechowski participated in round table talks between the ruling party and opposition figures that lasted from 6 February to 4 April 1989.

=== Work ===
Orzechowski is the author of a book about political conditions in Poland and Polish foreign relations from 1989 to 1994.

== Awards and decorations ==
- Commander's Cross of the Order of Polonia Restituta (1984)
- Knight's Cross of the Order of Polonia Restituta
- Medal of the National Education Commission
- Sash of the Order of the Aztec Eagle (Mexico, 1986)
- Order of Friendship (North Korea, 1987)
- Jubilee Medal "Forty Years of Victory in the Great Patriotic War 1941–1945" (USSR, 1985)
