= Marek Prawda =

Polish sociologist and diplomat

Marek Prawda Ph.D.
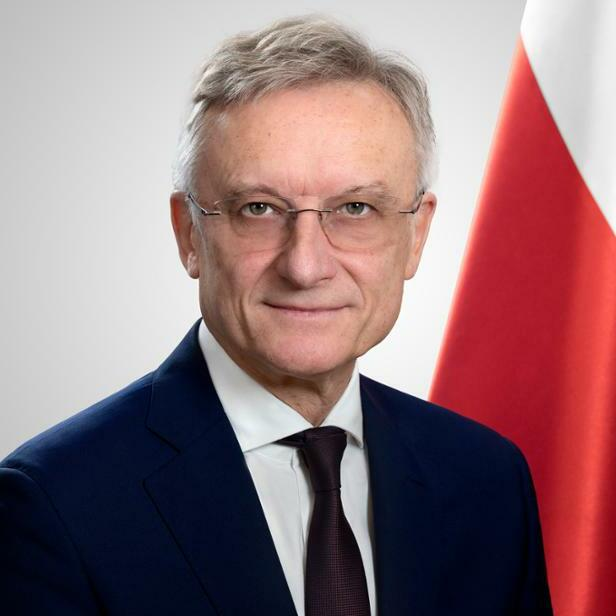
- Marek Prawda (2024)

Poland Ambassador to Sweden
- In office 2001–2005
- Preceded by: Ryszard Czarny
- Succeeded by: Michał Czyż

Poland Ambassador to Germany
- In office 2006–2012
- Preceded by: Andrzej Byrt
- Succeeded by: Jerzy Margański

6. Poland Ambassador to the European Union
- In office 2012–2016
- Preceded by: Jan Tombiński
- Succeeded by: Jarosław Starzyk

Personal details
- Born: 1 October 1956 (age 69) Kielce

Marek Władysław Prawda (born 1 October 1956 in Kielce) is a Polish sociologist and diplomat; from January 2024 to August 2026 he served as Undersecretary of State of the Ministry of Foreign Affairs. Between April 2016 and 2021 he was Head of Representation – Poland at European Commission.

== Life ==
Prawda studied economics at the University of Leipzig and sociology at the Institute of Philosophy and Sociology of the Polish Academy of Sciences. In 1979 he obtained a degree in economic studies and in 1984 a PhD degree in sociology. Until 1990 he has been working at the Polish Academy of Science. He was member of Solidarity.

In 1992 he started his diplomatic career as First Secretary to the Embassy of Poland in Bonn, Germany. In 2000 and 2005 he had been Director at the Secretariat of the Minister of Foreign Affairs.

From 2001 to 2005, he served as Ambassador to Sweden, from 2006 to 2012 as Ambassador to Germany and from 2012 to 2016 as Ambassador to the European Union.

In February 2016, Prawda ended his term. In April 2016, he was appointed by Jean-Claude Juncker as Head of the European Representation in Warsaw. He ended his term in 2021.

In January 2024, he was appointed Undersecretary of State at the Ministry of Foreign Affairs. He ended his mission in August 2025. In January 2026, he became Chargé d'affaires a.i. of Poland to Switzerland.

While Ambassador to Germany, Prawda has been an important promoters of the German-Polish dialogue. In 2012 he has been awarded the Grand Cross of the Order of Merit of the Federal Republic of Germany and the Order of Merit of Brandenburg.

Prawda has published a number of articles on Polish-German relations in newspapers and magazines.

Besides Polish, he speaks English, German, French, Swedish and Russian.

== Works ==
- Prawda, Marek (1987), Cykl życia jednostki a wartości pracy, Wrocław: Zakład Narodowy im. Ossolińskich, p. 261, ISBN 83-04-02401-2
