= Andrzej Byrt =

Polish economist and former diplomat

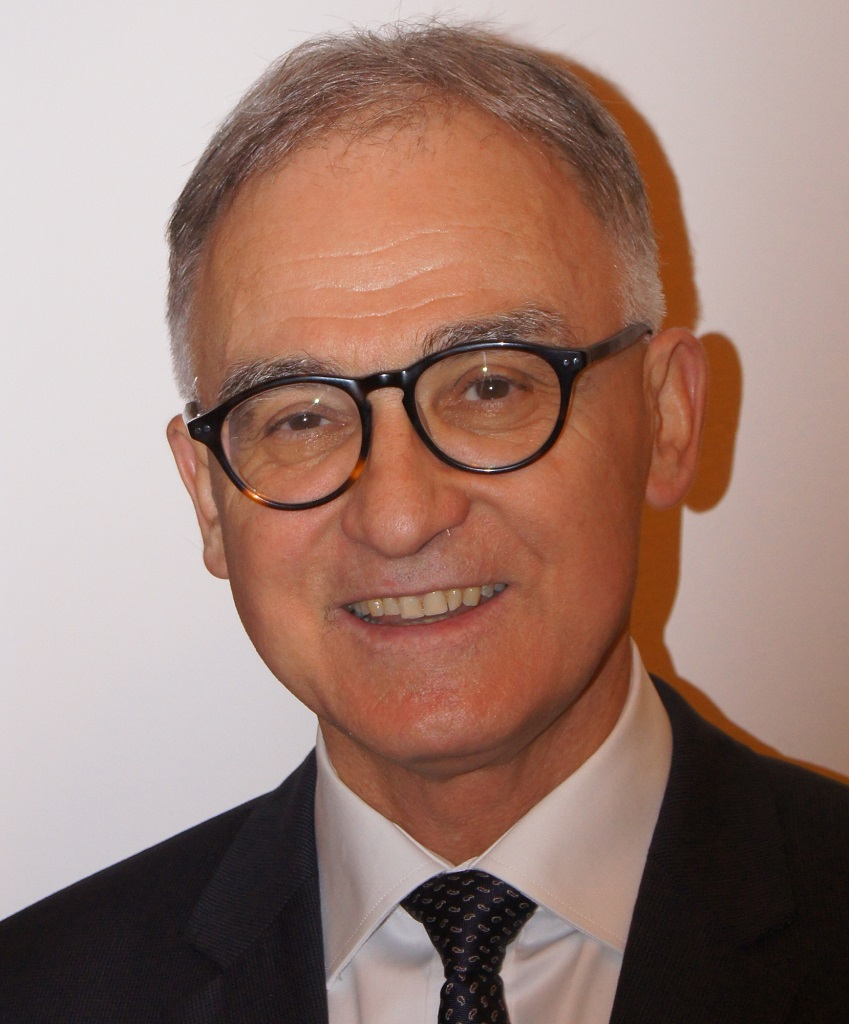
- Andrzej Byrt (2017)

Poland Ambassador to Germany
- In office 1995–2001
- Preceded by: Janusz Reiter
- Succeeded by: Jerzy Kranz

Poland Ambassador to Germany
- In office 2006–2002
- Preceded by: Jerzy Kranz
- Succeeded by: Marek Prawda

Poland Ambassador to France
- In office 2015–2016
- Preceded by: Tomasz Orłowski
- Succeeded by: Tomasz Młynarski

Personal details
- Born: 1 August 1956 (age 70) Łódź, Poland
- Education: Poznań University of Economics
- Profession: Diplomat, economist

Andrzej Jan Byrt (born 20 September 1949 in Poznań, Poland) is a Polish economist and former diplomat and deputy minister. Byrt has been Ambassador to Germany (1995–2001, 2002–2006), France and Monaco (2015–2016).

== Life ==
Byrt studied at the Poznań University of Economics (UEP), in 1977 he obtained a Ph.D. degree in economic studies. From 1978 to 1986, he worked for the Poznań International Fair (Polish: Międzynarodowe Targi Poznańskie, MTP), first as marketing director and since 1982 as general director. Later he has been an economic consultant at the Polish Embassy in Brussels and subsequently Deputy minister (wiceminister) in the Ministry of Economic Cooperation.

From 1995 to 2001, Byrt has been Ambassador to the Federal Republic of Germany. In 2001 he was appointed Undersecretary at the Ministry of Foreign Affairs by Leszek Miller but returned to Germany from 2002 to 2006 as Ambassador. His successor in Berlin became Marek Prawda.

Byrt then advised the MTP Board of Directors before becoming Chairman of the Board and President of the Polish Exhibition Association from 2009 to 2014. In January 2015, he was appointed Polish Ambassador to France and Monaco. After Beata Szydło took over the government Byrt had to leave the diplomatic service in July 2016.

Aleksander Kwaśniewski appointed Byrt to the advisory board of the "Amicus Europae" foundation. He had also been active in the Economic Sciences Committee of the Polish Academy of Sciences, the Polish Olympic Committee, and the Commission for International Cooperation in Warsaw.

Byrt has been awarded the Grand Cross of the Order of Merit of the Federal Republic of Germany. In 1997 he was awarded the Officers' and 2011 the Commander's Cross of the Order of Polonia Restituta. Estonia honored the diplomat in 2002 with the Order of the White Star II. Class. In 2016 he received the title of the 25th honorary doctor of the Poznań University of Economics.

Byrt's father came to Babelsberg as a forced labourer in November 1939, he refused to participate in the accreditation ceremony of his son. – He was the only ambassador who had a ride on the parade of Cologne Carnival. When moving the Polish embassy from Cologne to Berlin, he started symbolically in a hot air balloon.
