= Olechowski =

Olechowski is a Polish surname. Notable people with the surname include:

- Andrzej Olechowski (1947–2026), Polish economist and politician
- Tadeusz Olechowski (1926–2001), Polish communist politician and diplomat
