= Janusz Reiter =

Polish diplomat (born 1952)

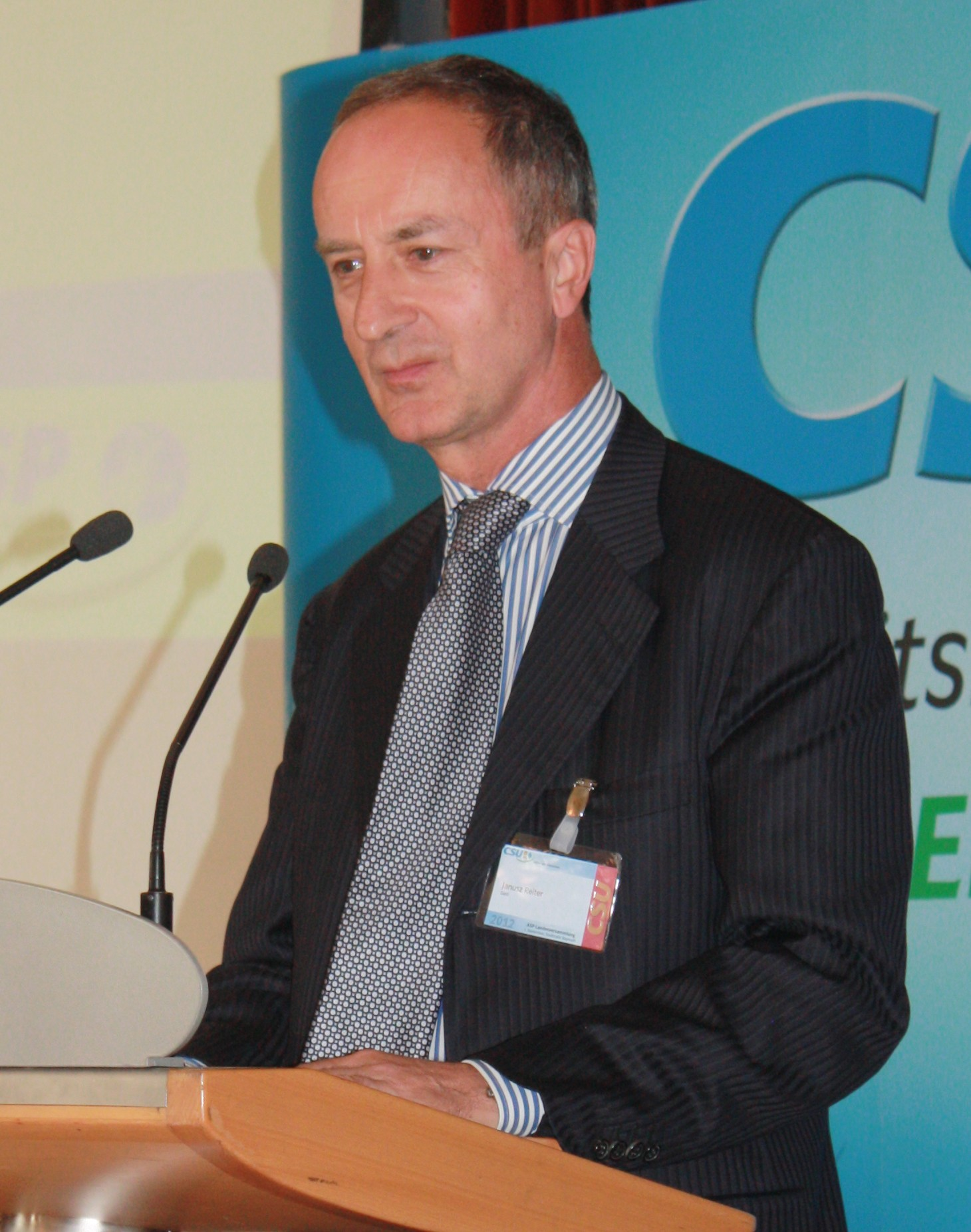

Poland Ambassador to Germany
- In office 1990–1995
- Preceded by: Ryszard Karski
- Succeeded by: Andrzej Byrt

Poland Ambassador to the United States
- In office 2005–2007
- Preceded by: Przemysław Grudziński
- Succeeded by: Robert Kupiecki

Personal details
- Born: 6 August 1952 (age 74) Kościerzyna, Poland
- Spouse: Hanna
- Children: 2 daughters
- Education: University of Warsaw
- Profession: Diplomat

Janusz Stanisław Reiter (born 6 August 1952) is a Polish diplomat.

== Career ==
Janusz Reiter has graduated from German studies at the University of Warsaw. A former Solidarity activist and editor of certain opposition magazines for seven years during communist rule in Poland, Reiter became an editor for Życie Warszawy and later served as a diplomat for Poland. From 1990 to 1995, he was Poland's ambassador to Germany. He was the Polish ambassador to the United States from 2005 to 2007, also accredited to the Bahamas as well.

Reiter returned to Poland in late 2007 and took the position of Poland's Special Envoy for Climate Change. He also served as vice-chairman of the management board of the media company Presspublica. From 2010 until 2013, he was the president of the Polish Center for International Relations; he now serves as chairman of the board. Also, he is on the advisory board of OMFIF where he participates in various meetings regarding the financial and monetary system.

Reiter has received the Grand Crosses with Star and Sash of the Order of Merit of the Federal Republic of Germany.

== Other activities ==
- Scope Group, Member of the Advisory
- Deutsche Bank, Member of the Advisory Board

== Bibliography ==
- Reiter, Janusz (Spring 2007). "Bridging the Oder : reflections on Poland, Germany, and the transformation of Europe – Part II. Lecture delivered at the German Unification Symposium, October 3, 2006". Bulletin of the German Historical Institute. 40: 47–51.
