= Irena Anders =

Polish-Ukrainian actress (1920-2010)

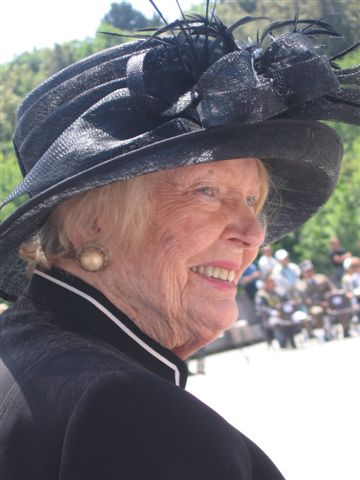
- Born: Irena Jarosiewicz; 12 May 1920; Bruntál, Czechoslovakia
- Died: 29 November 2010 (aged 90); London, England
- Occupations: Actress, singer
- Spouses: Guido Lorraine; Władysław Anders
- Children: Anna Maria Anders (born 1950)

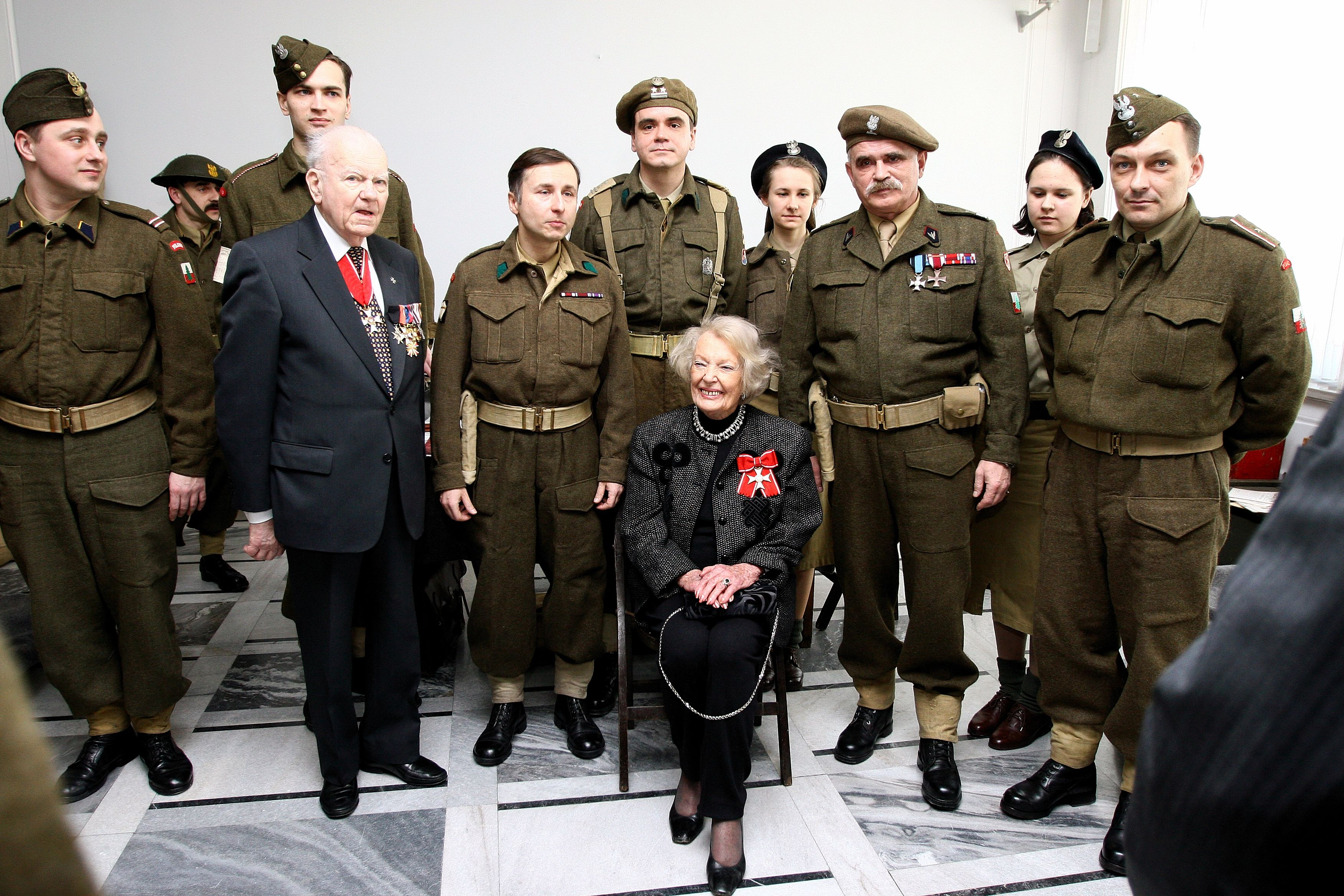
Irena Anders in the Polish Senate (2008)

Irena Renata Anders (12 May 1920 – 29 November 2010), born Iryna Renata Jarosiewicz (Yarosevych), was a Polish-Ukrainian stage actress and singer. During World War II she performed with Henryk Wars' troupe and later with the Polska Parada (Polish Parade) band, entertaining the Polish Armed Forces in the West (commanded by General Władysław Anders, her future husband). She was one of the first singers to perform the anthem, Czerwone maki na Monte Cassino (The Red Poppies on Monte Cassino).

== Life and career ==
She was born as Iryna Yarosevych into a Ukrainian family in Bruntál, Czechoslovakia (present-day Czech Republic), where her father Mykola Yarosevych was a chaplain for Greek-Catholic soldiers. Her mother Olena Yarosevych (née Nyzhankivska) came from a Ukrainian family which counted theater artists and musicians as their members, was the native sister of composer Ostap Nyzhankivsky and opera singer Oleksandr Nyzhankivsky. Shortly after her birth, her family migrated eastward to what was then designated the Ukrainian People's Republic, and her father became chaplain of the Ukrainian Sich Riflemen and later was a priest in the villages Sapohiv and Bryn, which shortly became part of Poland. In 1926 the family moved to Lwów (today Lviv), where Iryna went to a Greek Catholic gymnasium and Ukrainian trading school. From 1929 to 1939 she also studied in the Lysenko Lviv Musical Institute, in her cousin Nestor Nyzhankivsky's fortepiano class, and later in the vocal class of Mariya Sokil and Lidiya Ulukhanova.

She used the stage name Renata Bogdańska. After World War II, she migrated to the United Kingdom.

She starred in several movies. In 2003, a documentary film was made about her. On 12 May 2007, the Polish president, Lech Kaczyński awarded Anders the Commander's Cross of the Order of Polonia Restituta, "for outstanding contribution to the independence of the Polish Republic, for Polish community and social activities" .

She died at age 90 from a heart attack on 29 November 2010, in London.

== Family ==
Her parents were the Greek Catholic priest Mykola Yarosevych (1873–1957) and his wife Olena Yarosevych (née Nyzhankivska; 1878–1957). Her father before World War I had Russophile views, for which, after the war broke out, the Austrian government sent him to Talerhof Concentration Camp. After the war he became Ukrainophile. On her mother's side she came from a family of Ukrainian nobles of patriotic and musical traditions. Her mother's brothers were Ukrainian composer, singer and politician Ostap Nyzhankivsky (1863–1919), and Ukrainian composer and opera singer Oleksandr Nyzhankivsky. Her cousins were Ukrainian composer and pianist Nestor Nizhankivsky, and Ukrainian composer and music author of March of Ukrainian Nationalists Omelian Nyzhankivsky (1863–1919). In her youth she participated in Ukrainian Scouts Organisation, as did her brother Anatol (1909–1982), who was in the same group as Roman Shukhevych. Brother Stepan (1923–1944) was killed in the Ukrainian Insurgent Army. In 1948, she married the decorated Polish General and World War II hero, Władysław Anders. They had a daughter, Anna Maria Anders, (born 1950).

== Selected discography ==
=== Gramophone (78 rpm) records ===
- Ludzie mówią / Słońce nad Paryżem (Polonia, Cat. 180 Op. 233A/234A)
- Uśmiech Wilna / Wróć (Polonia, Cat. 181 Op. 235/236 Fs. 723/724)
- Czarny kot / Nad jeziorem (Polonia, Cat. 207 Op. 287/290)
- Dlaczegoś spójrzałeś na mnie / Siano (Polonia, Cat. 208 Op. 288/289)
- Dziękuję ci / Serce i wino (Polonia, Cat. 209 Op. 291/293)
- Umówiłem się z nią na dziewiątą / Que sera, sera (Polonia, Cat. 210 Op. 292/294)
- Pod dachami Paryża / Bezsenna noc (Polonia, Cat. 211 Op. 295/297)
- Violetera / Walc księżycowy (Polonia, Cat. 212 Op. 296/298)

=== LPs ===
- Renata Bogdańska śpiewa kujawiaki Ref-Rena i inne piosenki (Renata Bogdanska sings kujawiaks by Ref-Ren and other songs): Melodia Records Co. (Chicago) LPM-1010 (mono) or SLPM-1010 (stereo)
- Do słuchu i tańca (For listening and dance): Melodia Records Co. (Chicago) LPM-1012 (mono) or SLPM-1012 (stereo)
- Renata Bogdańska śpiewa piosenki romantyczne (Renata Bogdanska sings romantic songs): Melodia Records Co. (Chicago) SLPM-1022
- Renata Bogdańska śpiewa piosenki sentymentalne (Renata Bogdanska sings sentimental songs): Melodia Records Co. (Chicago) SLPM-1024
- Moja córka i inne przeboje (My daughter and other hits): Melodia Records Co. (Chicago) LPM-1028

=== CDs ===
- (2010) Nagrania Orbis Polonia Londyn: Renata Bogdańska (Recordings of Orbis Polonia, London: Renata Bogdanska), Teddy Records TR CD 1014
