= Konrad Głębocki =

Polish economist

Konrad Zygmunt Głębocki
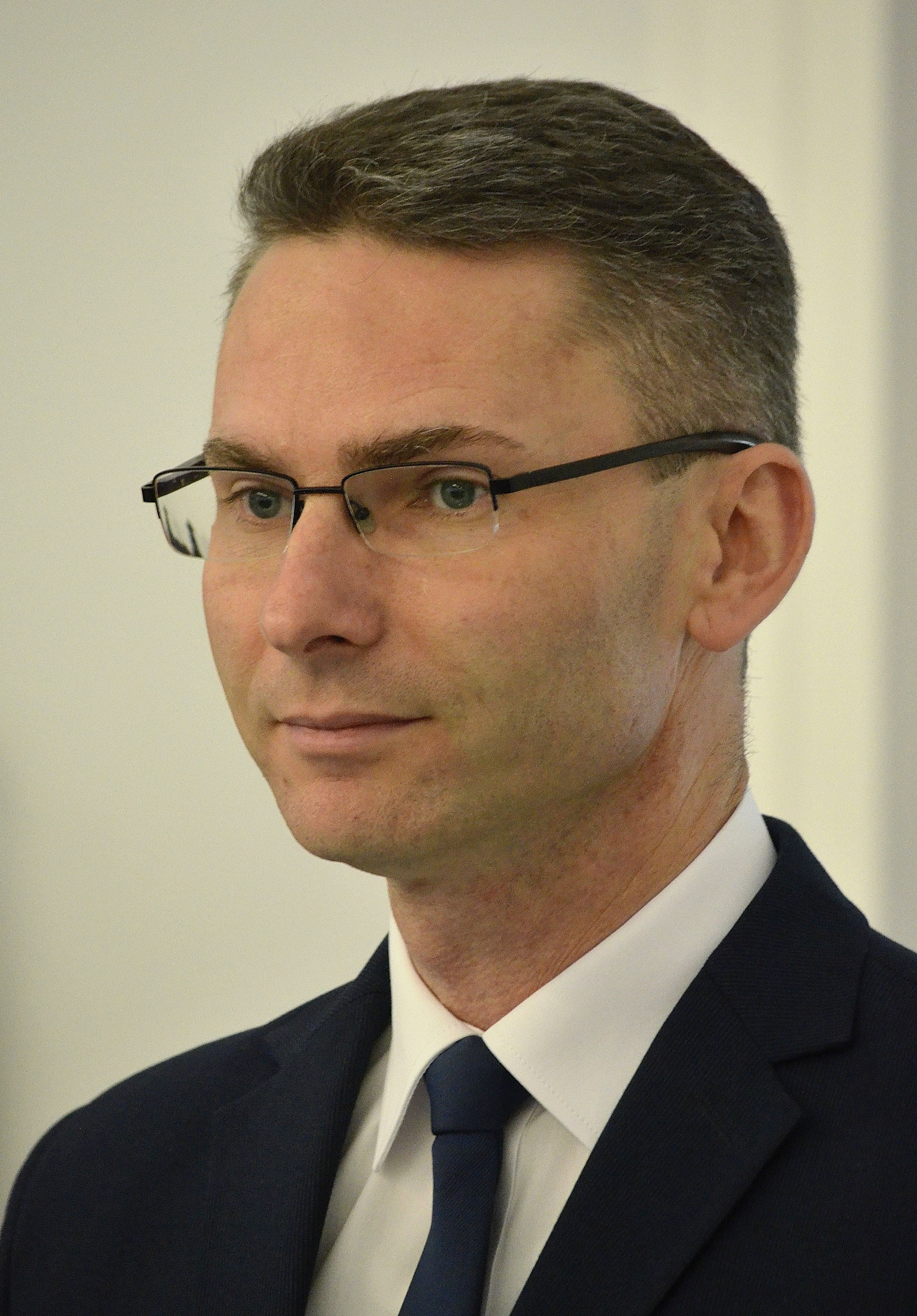

member of Sejm 2015-2019
- In office 2015–2018

Ambassador of Poland to Italy
- In office 5 June 2018 – 2018
- Preceded by: Tomasz Orłowski
- Succeeded by: Anna Maria Anders

Personal details
- Born: 13 May 1972 (age 54) Częstochowa
- Party: Law and Justice
- Education: Wroclaw University
- Occupation: economist, academic teacher, politician

Konrad Zygmunt Głębocki (born 13 May 1972 in Częstochowa) – is a Polish politician, economist, academic teacher, local official.

== Biography ==
He graduated in 1997 from law studies at the Faculty of Law, Administration and Economics of the University of Wrocław. Professionally associated with the Częstochowa University of Technology.

In 2002, 2006 and 2010 he was elected in local elections from the center-right local initiative ''The Local Community of Tadeusz Wrona'' to the Częstochowa City Council. At that time he was the vice-chairman of the city council and the chairman of The Local Government Community. In the local elections in 2014 for the fourth time he obtained the councilor's mandate, starting as a candidate of Law and Justice.

In 2007 and 2011 he unsuccessfully ran from his own election committee to the Senate. In 2015, he took part in the parliamentary election from the seventh place on the PiS list to the Sejm in the Częstochowa district. He obtained 11,761 votes, which gave him the mandate with the second result among the candidates of his grouping in the district.

In June 2018 he was nominated as the Polish ambassador in Italy. Mariusz Trepka replaced him in the Sejm. After a few weeks from submitting letters of credentials, he resigned from the ambassador's seat and ended his term in December 2018.

== Political views ==
He is one of the most right-wing politicians from Częstochowa. As a councilor he supported the ban on the sale of alcohol in the area of the ''academic town'', he opposed building a casino in the city and declared the historical and cultural separateness of Częstochowa from Silesia.
