= Stefan Olszowski =

Polish politician (1931–2023)

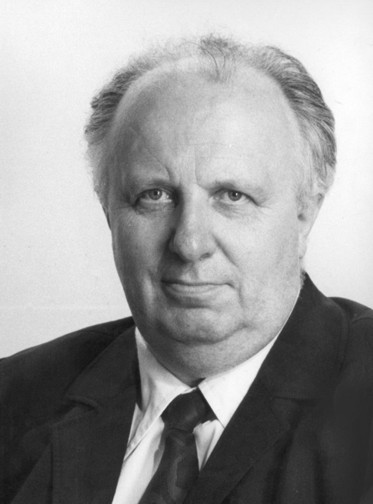

Minister of Foreign Affairs
- In office 21 July 1982 – 12 November 1985
- Prime Minister: Mieczyslaw Rakowski
- Preceded by: Józef Czyrek
- Succeeded by: Marian Orzechowski

Minister of Foreign Affairs
- In office 22 December 1971 – 2 December 1976
- Prime Minister: Piotr Jaroszewicz
- Preceded by: Stefan Jędrychowski
- Succeeded by: Emil Wojtaszek

Personal details
- Born: 28 August 1931 Toruń, Pomeranian Voivodeship, Poland
- Died: 19 December 2023 (aged 92)
- Party: Polish United Workers' Party

Stefan Michał Olszowski (28 August 1931 – 19 December 2023) was a Polish politician, who was a member of Polish United Workers' Party. He served as the foreign minister of the People's Republic of Poland for two terms.

== Biography ==
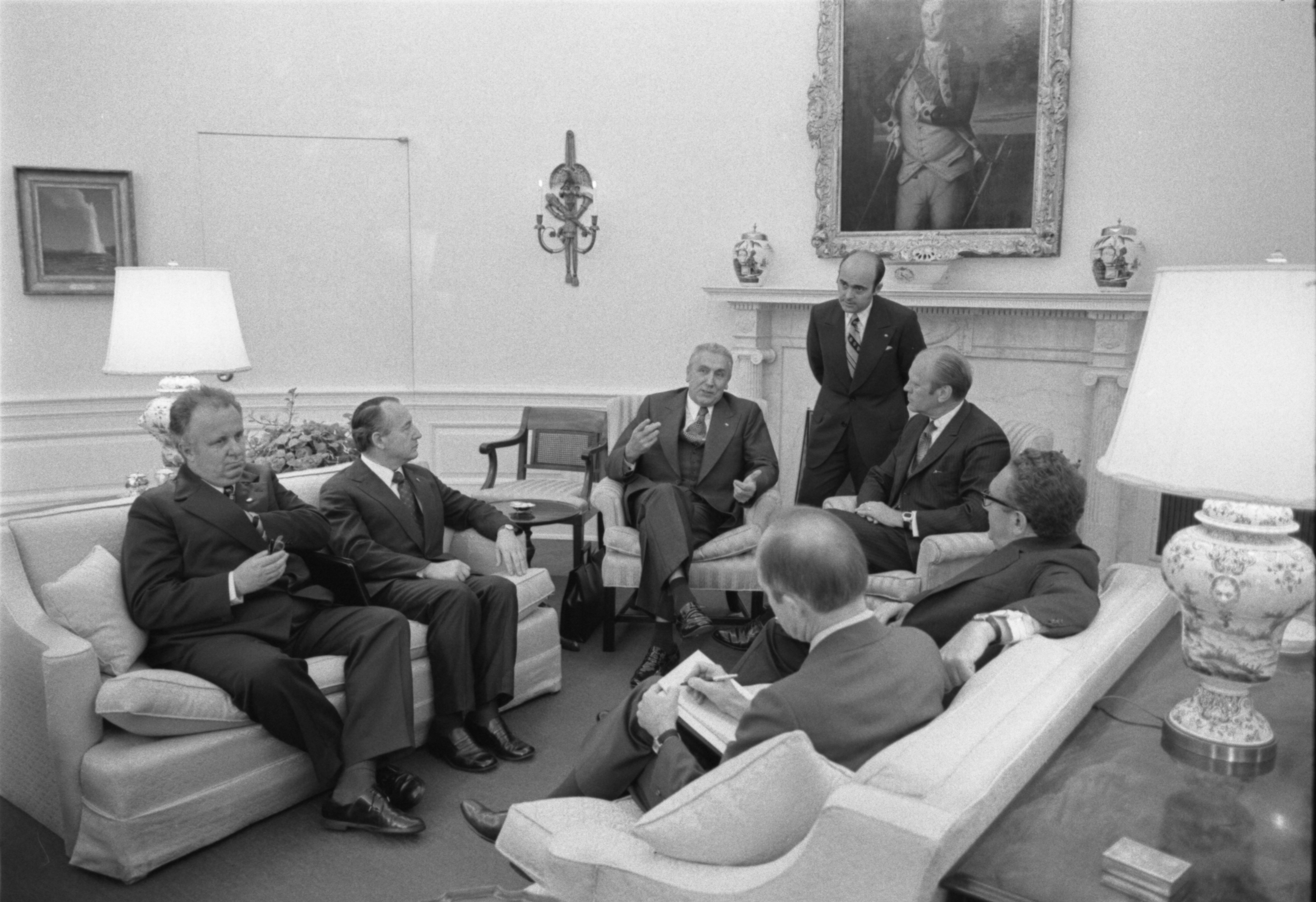
President Gerald Ford meeting with Edward Gierek, first secretary of the Central Committee of the Polish United Workers' Party (PZPR), Deputy Prime Minister Mieczyslaw Jagielski, Minister of Foreign Affairs Stefan Olszowski, Secretary of State Henry Kissinger, National Security Advisor Lt. Gen. Brent Scowcroft, and interpreter Henryk Sokalski in the Oval Office.

Olszowski was born in Toruń on 28 August 1931. He was a member of the Politburo of the Polish United Workers' Party from December 1970 to his resignation on 12 November 1985. He served as the propaganda chief of the party in the late 1960s and at the beginning of the 1970s.

Olszowski was appointed foreign minister on 22 December 1971, replacing Stefan Jędrychowski in the post. He was in office until 2 December 1976 when Emil Wojtaszek replaced him in the post. In 1980, he was appointed ambassador to East Germany and left the politburo for this post that he held just six months. Then he continued to serve at the politburo. He acted as the party's central committee secretary for ideology and media from August 1980 to July 1982. Then he was secondly appointed foreign minister in July 1982, replacing Józef Czyrek in the post. Before his appointment as foreign minister he run for the presidency of the party, but he was not elected. His term as foreign minister ended on 12 November 1985. He was also dismissed from the party leadership in 1985, partly due to his relationship with a Polish journalist whom he married after divorcing his first spouse. Then he and his girlfriend settled in New York in 1986.

=== Views and activities ===
Under the Edward Gierek's rule in the party, Olszowski was a reformist. However, later he became a hard-liner politician and a supporter of the Soviet Union while he was in office. In March 1968, he was the leading orchestrator of the anti-Semitic campaign began in Poland. In November 1973, he paid an official visit to Rome that was the first official visit to the Vatican by a Polish government minister since World War II. However, during the visit of Pope to Poland from 16 to 23 June 1983 he and Prime Minister Mieczyslaw Rakowski directly attacked on some of the Pope's pronouncements.

Olszowski together with other hard-liners strived for an armed confrontation with the Solidarity movement. He was instrumental in cracking down the movement at its initial phase.

== Personal life and death ==
Olszowski married twice. Following his divorce, he married a younger Polish journalist woman. They live in New York.

Stefan Olszowski died on 19 December 2023, at the age of 92.

== Awards and decorations ==
- Polish:
  - Order of the Banner of Labour, 1st Class
  - Order of the Banner of Labour, 2nd Class
  - Officer's Cross of the Order of Polonia Restituta
  - Gold Cross of Merit
  - Silver Cross of Merit (1956)
  - Medal of the 30th Anniversary of People's Poland (1974)
  - Gold Medal of Merit for National Defence (1973)
- From other countries:
  - Grand Cross of the Order of Prince Henry (Portugal)
  - Order of the Red Banner (Mongolia, 1975)
  - 90th Anniversary of the Birth of Georgi Dimitrov Medal (Bulgaria, 1972)
  - 100th Anniversary of the Birth of Georgi Dimitrov Medal (Bulgaria, 1983)
  - Jubilee Medal "Thirty Years of Victory in the Great Patriotic War 1941–1945" (USSR, 1975)
  - Jubilee Medal "Forty Years of Victory in the Great Patriotic War 1941–1945" (USSR, 1985)
  - Jubilee Medal "In Commemoration of the 100th Anniversary of the Birth of Vladimir Ilyich Lenin" (USSR, 1969)
