= Witold Orłowski =

Polish professor of economics (born 1962)

Witold Maciej Orłowski
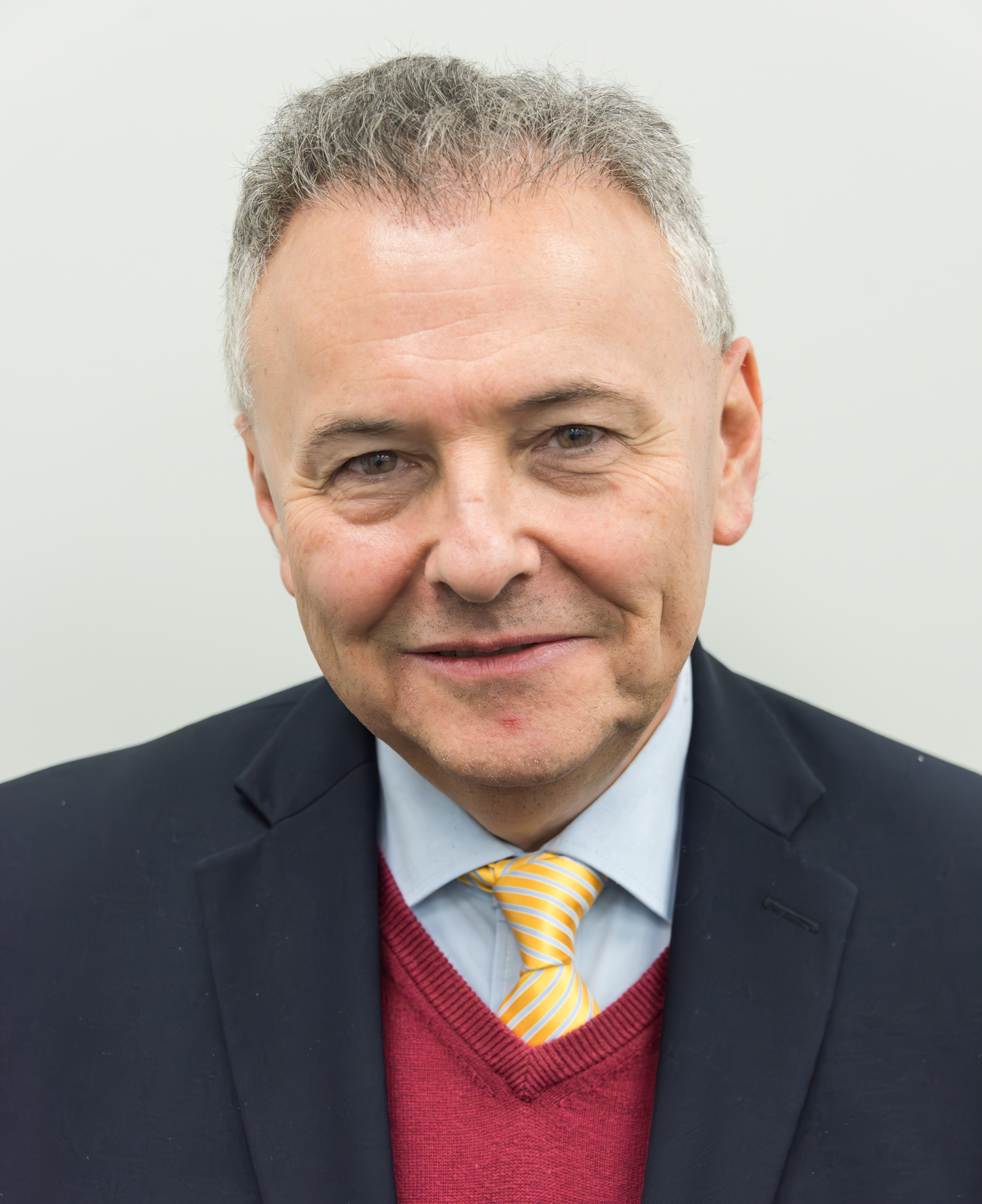
- Orłowski in 2025
- Born: 1962 (age 62–63); Łódź, Poland
- Citizenship: Polish
- Occupation: professor of economics
- Known for: Director of the Warsaw University of Technology Business School

Witold Maciej Orłowski (born 1962 in Łódź) is a Polish professor of economics. He is Director of the Warsaw University of Technology Business School and a Member of the Prime Minister’s Economic Council. Beside, he acts as Chief Economic Adviser for PricewaterhouseCoopers in Poland. In 2011 he was appointed Special Adviser (budget) to the European Commission. Currently, he is the Rector of Group of Universities.

== Biography ==
Orłowski graduated (PhD) in Economics from the University of Łódź and later Harvard University. Until 1992 he was working as assistant professor in Łódź and from 1993 to 1997 in the World Bank (Department for Central Europe). He received his habilitation from the University of Warsaw and was appointed professor in 2007. He was adviser to Leszek Balcerowicz and, from 2002 to 2005, he held the post of Head of Economic Advisory Council to the Polish President, Aleksander Kwaśniewski.

In 1997 Orłowski co-founded the Independent Center for Economic Studies (NOBE). He held the post of Director of the Research Centre for Economic and Statistical Studies of the Central Statistical Office and the Polish Academy of Sciences (PAS). He is Secretary of the Scientific Council of the Polish Economic Society, Member of the Committee on Economic Sciences (PAS) and the “Poland 2000 Plus” Forecast Committee (PAS).

Orłowski specialises in macroeconomics, in particular economic modeling, economic forecasting and simulation calculations. He is jury member at Galeria Chwały Polskiej Ekonomii.

Brother of diplomat Tomasz Orłowski.

== Selected bibliography ==
- Droga do Europy. Makroekonomia wstępowania do Unii Europejskiej, Instytut Europejski, Łódź, 1998
- Optymalna ścieżka do euro, Wydawnictwo Naukowe Scholar, Warsaw 2004
- Stulecie chaosu. Alternatywne dzieje XX wieku, Open Wydawnictwo Naukowe i Literackie, Warsaw 2007
- Świat, który oszalał czyli poradnik na ciekawe czasy, Agora, Warsaw 2008
- W pogoni za straconym czasem. Wzrost gospodarczy w Europie Środkowo-Wschodniej, PWE, Warsaw 2010
- Świat do przeróbki. Spekulanci, bankruci, giganci i ich rywale, Agora, Warsaw 2011
