= Anna Maria Anders =

Polish ambassador (born 1950)

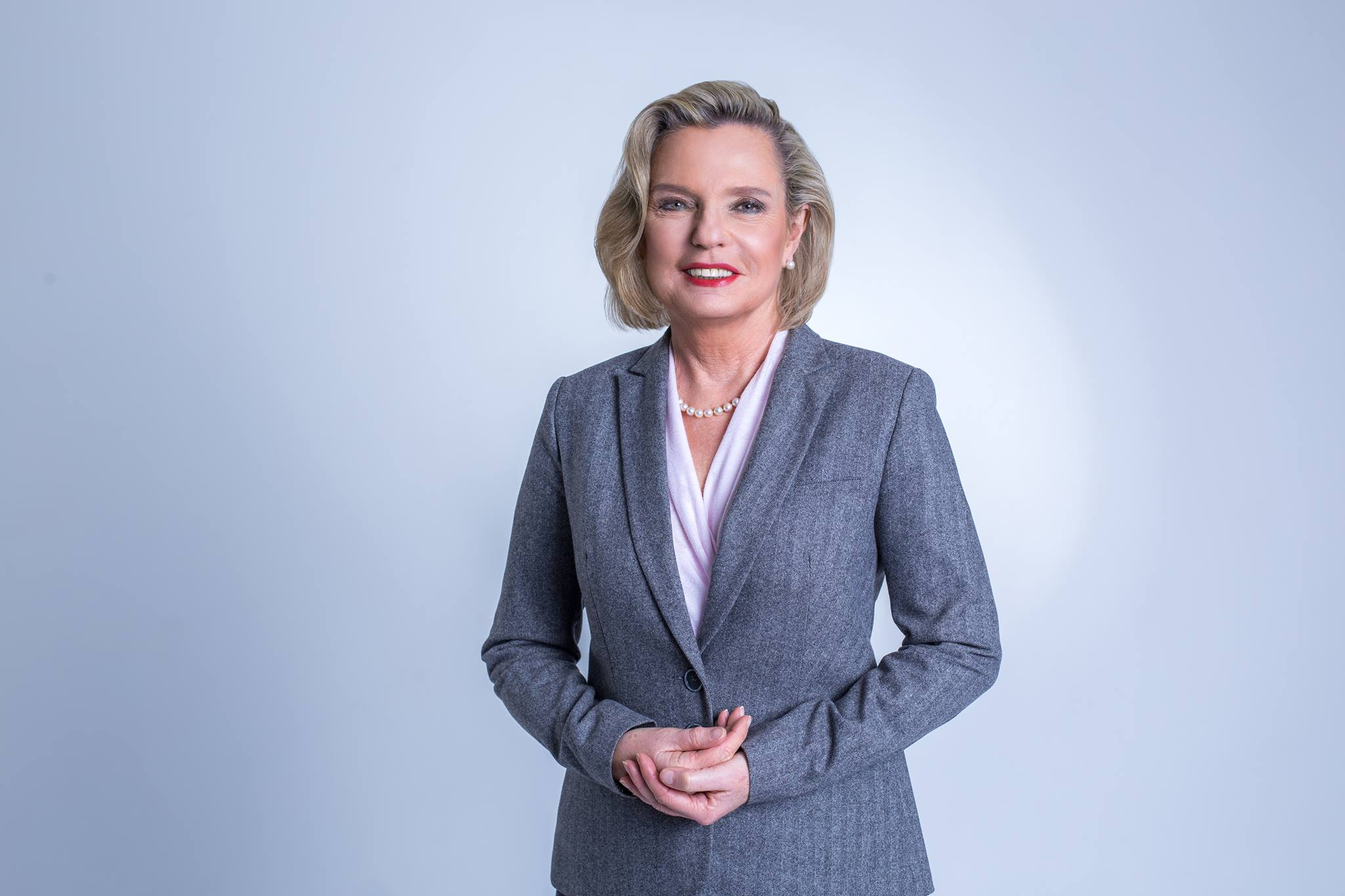
- Official portrait, 2016

Senator, Plenipotentiary for International Dialogue in the rank of Secretary of State
- In office 2016–2019

Polish Ambassador to Italy
- In office August 2019 – 31 May 2024
- Preceded by: Konrad Głębocki
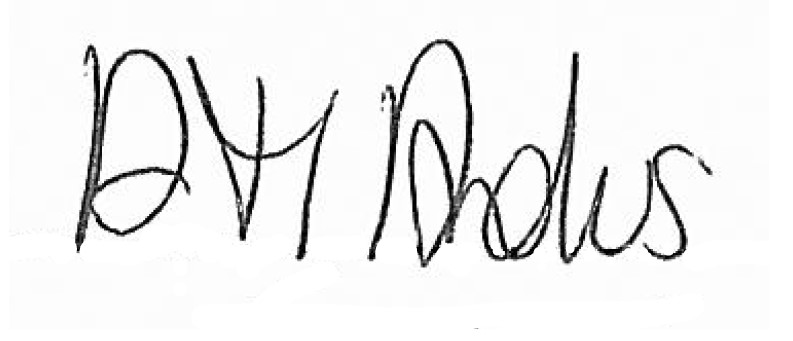
- Signature

Anna Maria Anders (London, 22 November 1950) is a diplomat, who was the ambassador of the Republic of Poland to Italy and to San Marino (2019–2024).

== Life ==
Anders is the daughter of the World War II Commander of the Polish Forces at the Battle of Monte Cassino, General Władysław Anders and his wife, the singer and actress Irena Renata Anders, also known as Renata Bogdanska. She was born in London, England and graduated from Bristol University with an Honours Degree in Modern Languages (1973). She also has a Masters in Business Administration (MBA) from Boston University (1992). In 1986 Anna Maria Anders married United States Army Colonel Robert Alexander Costa, with whom she has a son, Robert Wladyslaw Costa, who is also an officer in the US Army.

After graduating from Bristol University, Anna Maria Anders worked as an Account Executive at a financial PR and advertising firm in the City of London. In the late 1970s, she moved to Paris, France where she worked in the communications department of UNESCO. In 1980 she joined Rezayat Paris, a branch office of an international conglomerate with investments and joint ventures in the Middle East, Europe, USA and Asia.

In 1994, Anders relocated to the United States with her family. Following the death of her mother in 2010, she took over her mother's role and began travelling to Poland on a regular basis, visiting schools and attending military and government ceremonies.

For her services to Polish veterans in the United Kingdom and popularising the exploits of the 2nd Polish Corps during World War II, she was awarded the Gold Cross of Merit by Polish President Bronisław Komorowski. In 2015, she was presented with the Honorary Badge of the Association of Siberian Deportees. Since 2015, Anders has been an Honorary Member of the Reserve Officers Association of Poland.

She was the Plenipotentiary for International Dialogue in the rank of Secretary of State in the government of Poland's Prime Minister, Mateusz Morawiecki. In March 2016, she was elected to Poland's Senate in a by-election and represents Poland's eastern flank, which includes Łomża, Augustów and Suwałki. She also represents Poland in the WIP (Women in Parliaments Global Forum), a global network of female parliamentarians that supports greater participation of women in politics and promotes equal rights of women worldwide. In August 2019, she was nominated to be the Polish ambassador to Italy, which was also accredited to San Marino.

In her present position, Ambassador Anders represents Poland abroad. She is a supporter of military and veterans affairs.

== Distinction ==
- Gold Cross of Merit, 2014
- Honorary Badge of the Association of Siberian Deportees, 2015
- Honorary Member of the Reserve Officers Association of Poland, 2015
