= Józef Czyrek =

Polish politician (1928–2013)

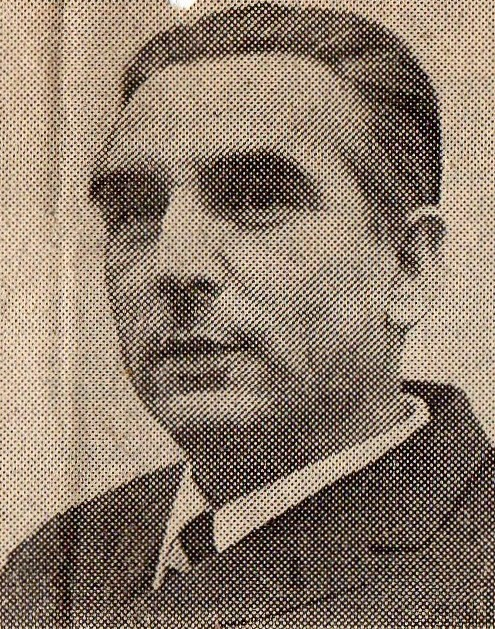
- Czyrek in 1981

Minister of Foreign Affairs
- In office 24 August 1980 – 21 July 1982
- Prime Minister: Józef Pińkowski; Wojciech Jaruzelski
- Preceded by: Emil Wojtaszek
- Succeeded by: Stefan Olszowski

Personal details
- Born: 20 July 1928 Białobrzegi, Lwów Voivodeship, Poland
- Died: 3 June 2013 (aged 84) Grodzisk Mazowiecki, Poland
- Party: Polish United Workers' Party
- Education: Jagiellonian University
- Awards

Józef Czyrek (20 July 1928 – 3 June 2013) was a Polish politician who served as the minister of foreign affairs of the People's Republic of Poland from 1980 to 1982.

== Early life and education ==
Czyrek was born in Białobrzegi, in the Lwów Voivodeship of Poland, in 1928. He graduated with a bachelor's degree in economics from Jagiellonian University in 1950.

== Career ==
Czyrek began his career as a researcher at Jagiellonian University and Cracow University of Economics. In 1952 he joined the ministry of foreign affairs. He was a member of the Politburo of the Polish United Workers' party to which he joined in 1955. He served as the counsel in Belgrade (1962–1968) and deputy director as well as director of studies and programming department at the ministry of foreign affairs (1969–1971).

He was the deputy minister of foreign affairs until August 1980. He was appointed minister of foreign affairs in August 1980, replacing Emil Wojtaszek in the post. In 1981 he was named as the member of the party's secretariat. Czyrek's tenure as minister of foreign affairs ended in 1982. In December 1982, he was appointed vice-president of the Patriotic Movement for National Rebirth (PRON). Czyrek also acted as top aide to the Polish president and general secretary of the communist party Wojciech Jaruzelski. Czyrek participated in round table talks between the ruling party and opposition figures that lasted from 6 February to 4 April 1989.

His term as top aide ended on 30 July 1989 when Jaruzelski resigned from the leadership of the communist party. Czyrek also resigned from the communist party's central committee on that date.

== Death ==
Czyrek died on 3 June 2013.

== Awards and decorations ==
- Order of the Banner of Labour, 1st Class
- Order of the Banner of Labour, 2nd Class
- Commander's Cross with Star of the Order of Polonia Restituta
- Commander's Cross of the Order of Polonia Restituta
- Knight's Cross of the Order of Polonia Restituta
- Gold Cross of Merit
- Silver Cross of Merit (1955)
- Medal of the 30th Anniversary of People's Poland
- Medal of the 40th Anniversary of People's Poland
- Medal od Ludwik Waryński (1988)
- Commander of the Legion of Honour
- Grand Decoration of Honour in Gold with Star of the Decoration of Honour for Services to the Republic of Austria (Austria, 1974)
- Grand Officer of the Order of Prince Henry (Portugal, 1976)
- Order of the October Revolution (USSR, 1988)
- Jubilee Medal "Forty Years of Victory in the Great Patriotic War 1941–1945" (USSR, 1985)
- 100th Anniversary of the Birth of Georgi Dimitrov Medal (Bulgaria, 1983)
