= Tomasz Młynarski =

Polish politician

Tomasz Młynarski Ph.D.
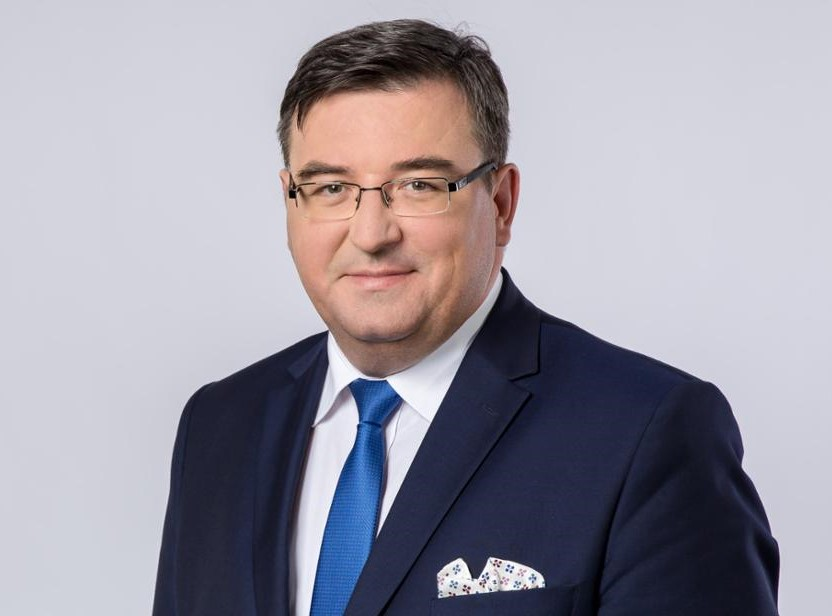

Poland Ambassador to France
- In office 12 August 2017 – 31 March 2022
- Preceded by: Andrzej Byrt
- Succeeded by: Jan Emeryk Rościszewski

Personal details
- Born: 1977 (age 48–49) Kraków
- Children: two
- Education: Jagiellonian University
- Profession: Political scientist

Tomasz Młynarski (born 1977 in Kraków) is a Polish political scientist and the former ambassador to France (2017–2022).

== Life ==
Tomasz Młynarski was born in 1977. He has earned his master's degree from the Jagiellonian University, Faculty of Law and Administration. In 2005, he defended there his Ph.D. thesis on France strategy toward European Union institutional reform and enlargement. In 2014, he received his post-doctoral degree (habilitation thesis: France in the process of communitarization of energy security and climate policy of the European Union). He has been educated also at the Institut d'études politiques de Rennes (1999–2000), Sciences Po in Paris (2012) and Sorbonne University (2012, 2014).

He works as an assistant professor at the Jagiellonian University, Faculty of International and Political Studies. His research interests include: energy cooperation in Europe, European integration, international security and France foreign policy. He authored six monographs and 70 scientific papers. He was also working as the manager at the private company and as the deputy director at the Małopolska Provincial Office in Kraków.

On 12 August 2017, Tomasz Młynarski was nominated Poland ambassador to France. On 13 October 2017, he presented his credentials to the President of France Emmanuel Macron. He is accredited also to Monaco. He ended his term on 31 March 2022.

He is married, with three children. Apart from his native Polish, he speaks English and French languages.

== Works ==
- Francja wobec głównych problemów reformy instytucjonalnej Unii Europejskiej w XXI w. , Wydawnictwo Dante, Kraków, 2006, ISBN 978-83-89500-99-1.
- Bezpieczeństwo energetyczne w pierwszej dekadzie XXI wieku: mozaika interesów i geostrategii, Wydawnictwo Uniwersytetu Jagiellońskiego, Kraków, 2011, ISBN 978-83-233-3119-3.
- Francja w procesie uwspólnotowienia bezpieczeństwa energetycznego i polityki klimatycznej Unii Europejskiej, Wydawnictwo Uniwersytetu Jagiellońskiego, Kraków 2013, ISBN 978-83-233-3497-2.
- Źródła energii i ich znaczenie dla bezpieczeństwa energetycznego w XXI wieku [with M. Tarnawski], Wydawnictwo Difin, Kraków 2015, ISBN 978-83-8085-024-8.
- Energetyka jądrowa wobec globalnych wyzwań bezpieczeństwa energetycznego i reżimu nieproliferacji w erze zmian klimatu, Wydawnictwo Uniwersytetu Jagiellońskiego, Kraków 2016, ISBN 978-83-233-4070-6.
- Bezpieczeństwo energetyczne i ochrona klimatu w drugiej dekadzie XXI wieku, Wydawnictwo Uniwersytetu Jagiellońskiego, Kraków 2017, ISBN 978-83-233-4239-7.
