= Emil Wojtaszek =

Polish politician (1927–2017)

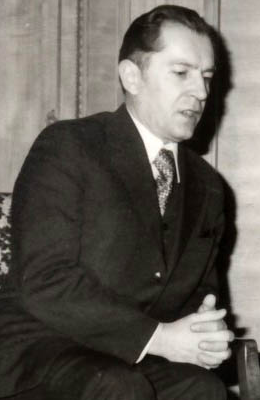

Minister of Foreign Affairs
- In office 2 December 1976 – 24 August 1980
- Prime Minister: Piotr Jaroszewicz; Edward Babiuch
- Preceded by: Stefan Olszowski
- Succeeded by: Józef Czyrek

Personal details
- Born: 22 August 1927 Kraków, Kraków Voivodeship, Poland
- Died: 17 June 2017 (aged 89) Warsaw, Masovian Voivodeship, Poland
- Resting place: Powązki Military Cemetery
- Party: Polish United Workers' Party

Emil Wojtaszek (22 August 1927 – 17 June 2017) was a Polish politician who served as the minister of foreign affairs of the People's Republic of Poland from 1976 to 1980.

== Biography ==
Wojtaszek was born in Kraków on 22 August 1927. He was central committee secretary of the Polish United Workers' party. He was also an alternate member of the party's political committee responsible for foreign affairs.

Wojtaszek served as foreign minister from 2 December 1976 to 24 August 1980. He signed an air service agreement with India on 25 January 1977. He was succeeded by Józef Czyrek in the post. He continued to serve at the party's central committee secretariat for foreign affairs after leaving the office. His term at the committee ended in April 1981 during the protests in the country. He also resigned from the Sejm in February 1982. The same year he was appointed ambassador of Poland to Italy.

Wojtaszek died in Warsaw on 17 June 2017 aged 89. He was buried in Powązki Military Cemetery, Warsaw.
