= Embassy of Poland, Rome =

Ambasada Rzeczypospolitej Polskiej w Rzymie Embassy of the Republic of Poland in Rome
- Location: Via P.P.Rubens, Rome, Italy
- Address: Via P.P.Rubens 20, 00197 Rome
- Coordinates: 41.8833°N 12.4833°E
- Ambassador: Ryszard Schnepf (Chargé d’affaires a.i.)

The Embassy of Poland in Rome (Polish: Ambasada Rzeczypospolitej Polskiej w Rzymie; Italian: Ambasciata della Repubblica di Polonia in Italia) is the diplomatic mission of the Republic of Poland to the Italian Republic. The chancery is located at Via P.P.Rubens 20, Rome.

The Polish Embassy in Rome is located in a period building situated behind a protective wall just off Via P.P.Rubens. The embassy is protected by the Italian state police and the Carabinieri. It is open to both Polish citizens and citizens of the European Union for representation, protection and legal concerns, however it only deals with passport and consular business for Polish citizens and visa applicants (of all nations).

The Polish ambassador to Italy is also accredited to the Republic of San Marino.

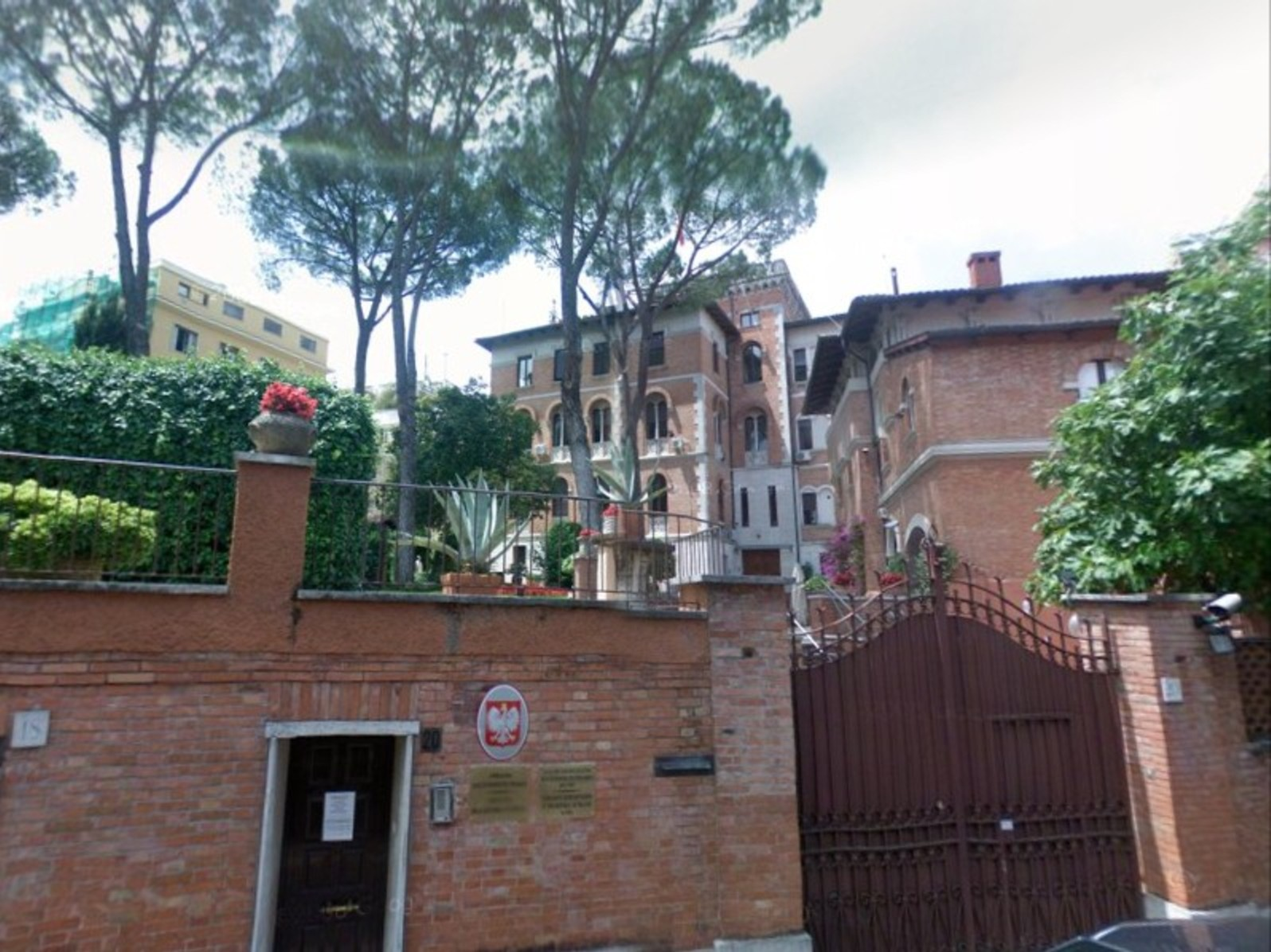
The Polish embassy's chancery in Rome

== See also ==
- Italy–Poland relations
- List of diplomatic missions of Poland
- Foreign relations of Poland
- Polish nationality law
