= Embassy of Poland, Paris =

Embassy of the Republic of Poland in Paris
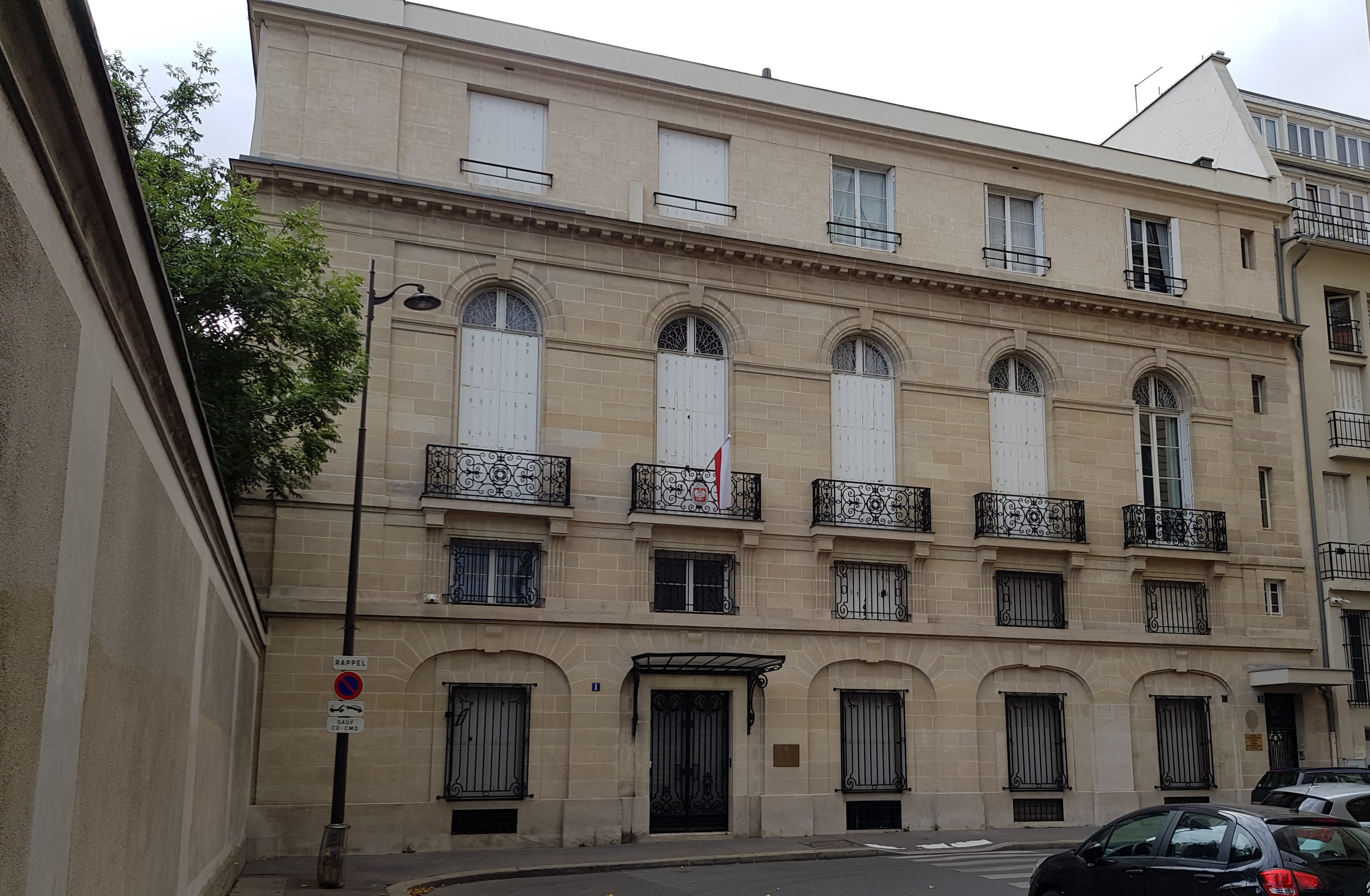
- Address: 1, rue de Talleyrand, 75343 Paris, France
- Coordinates: 48°51′32″N 2°18′56″E

The Embassy of Poland in Paris (French: Ambassade de Pologne en France) is the diplomatic mission of the Republic of Poland to the French Republic. It is located at 1 rue de Talleyrand, in the 7th arrondissement of Paris.

In addition to its embassy in Paris, Poland maintains a consulate general in Lyon, and honorary consulates in Nancy, Montpellier, Nice, Tours and Lille.

== History ==
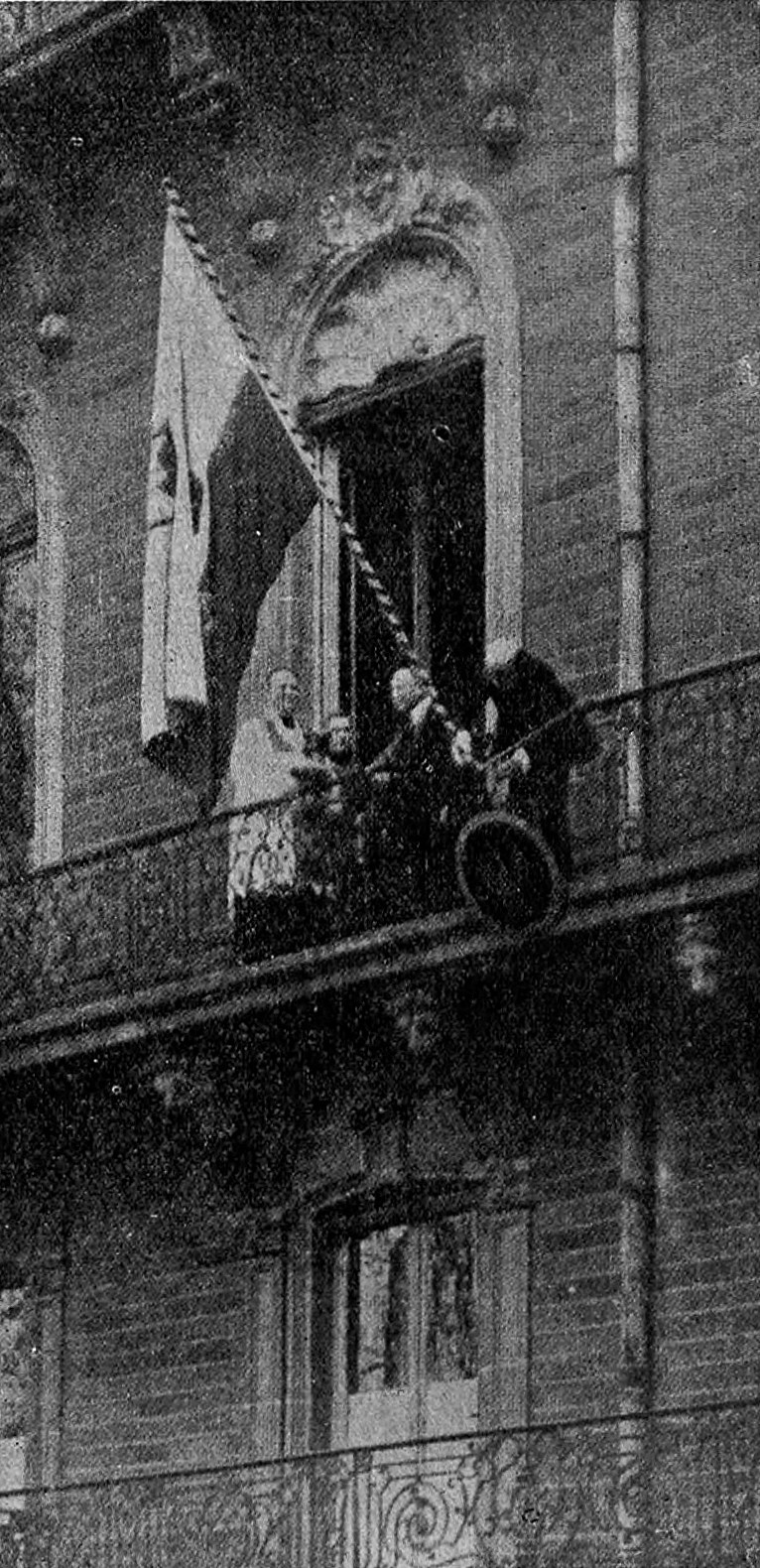
Inauguration of previous embassy at the avenue de Tokio, 3 May 1925

The Polish Envoy was established in 1919 based on former agencies of the Polish National Committee. In 1924, it was elevated to the rank of an embassy.

Initially, the embassy was located at 12 rue de Marignac in 1921 and then in the former seat of the Polish National Committee at 11-bis Avenue Kléber.

The embassy was then located in the 16th arrondissement, at 12-14 avenue de Tokio (now the avenue de New York), which was inaugurated on 3 May 1925, during Poland's Constitution Day celebrations. The building was expropriated and destroyed to build the Palais de Tokyo. This building was located on the site of the Musée d'Art Moderne de Paris, which occupies the east wing of the Palais de Tokyo.

The ambassador's residence is located a few meters away in the Hôtel de Monaco, a hôtel particulier in Faubourg Saint-Germain, near the Invalides. Its access is via a private driveway on rue Saint-Dominique. It was built in 1774 by Alexandre-Théodore Brongniart on the orders of Maria Caterina Brignole, who was recently divorced from Prince Honoré III of Monaco. It was later extensively modified under the July Monarchy by William Williams-Hope. It was later used as the embassies of the United Kingdom, Turkey and Austria. The building became the Polish embassy in 1936.

The embassy was evacuated in the autumn of 1940 following the Fall of France. The building saw use as the German Institute during the German occupation of France from 1940 to 1944. In July 1943, diplomatic representatives were exchanged between the Polish government-in-exile and the Free France Committee. Following the establishment of the French Committee of National Liberation in Algiers, a Polish diplomatic mission was also established there, before moving back to Paris in 1944.

At the end of 1981, bringing an end to the Gdańsk strikes led by Solidarity, President Jaruzelski declared martial law in Poland. Demonstrations in support of the Polish trade unionists were held in many places across France, attended by intellectuals, researchers, and artists. One such demonstration took place on 14 December in front of the Polish embassy.

Czesław Miłosz, recipient of the 1980 Nobel Prize in Literature, was the embassy's first secretary in 1950.

== Gallery ==
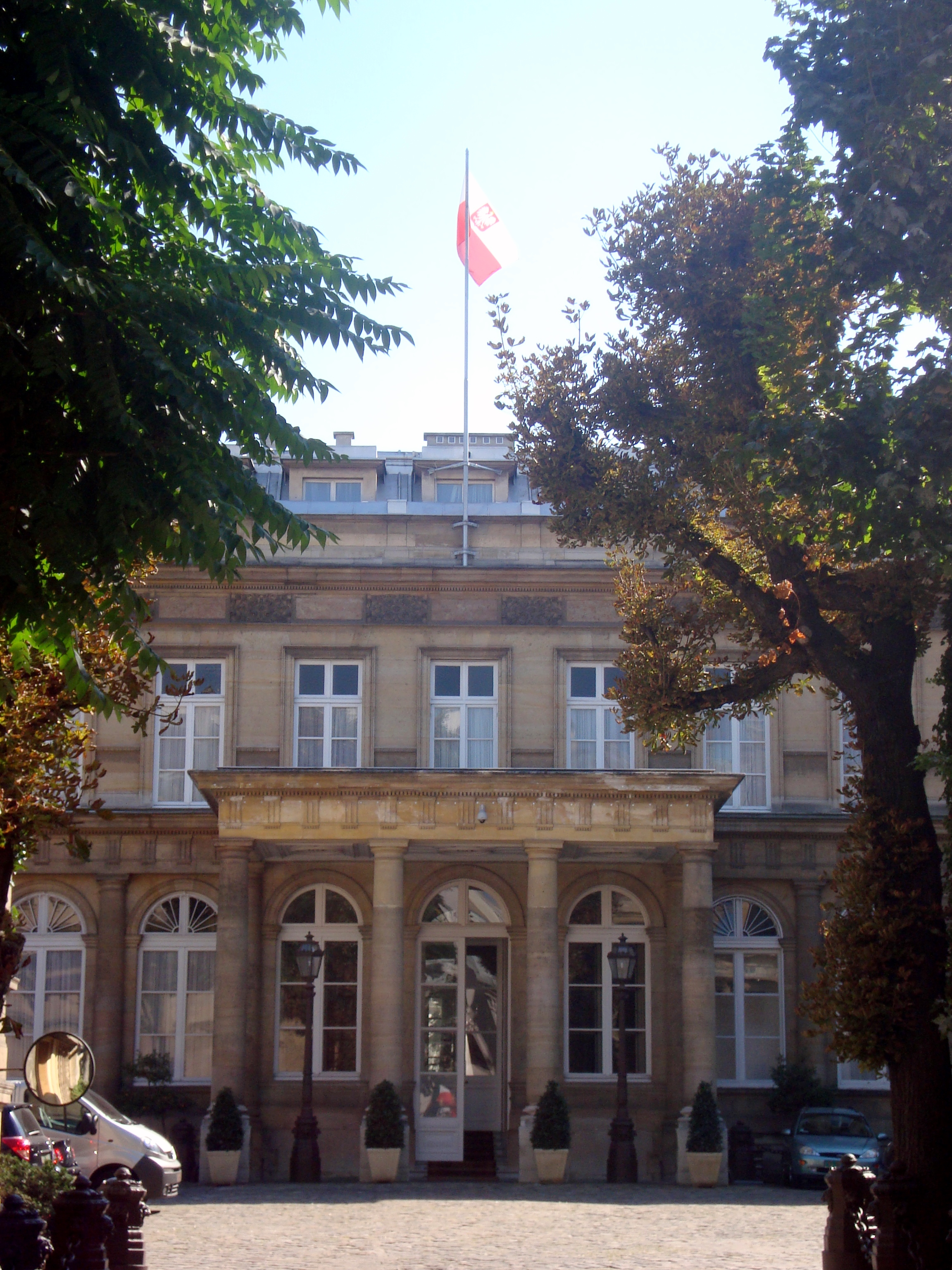
The Hôtel de Monaco - residence of the Polish ambassador

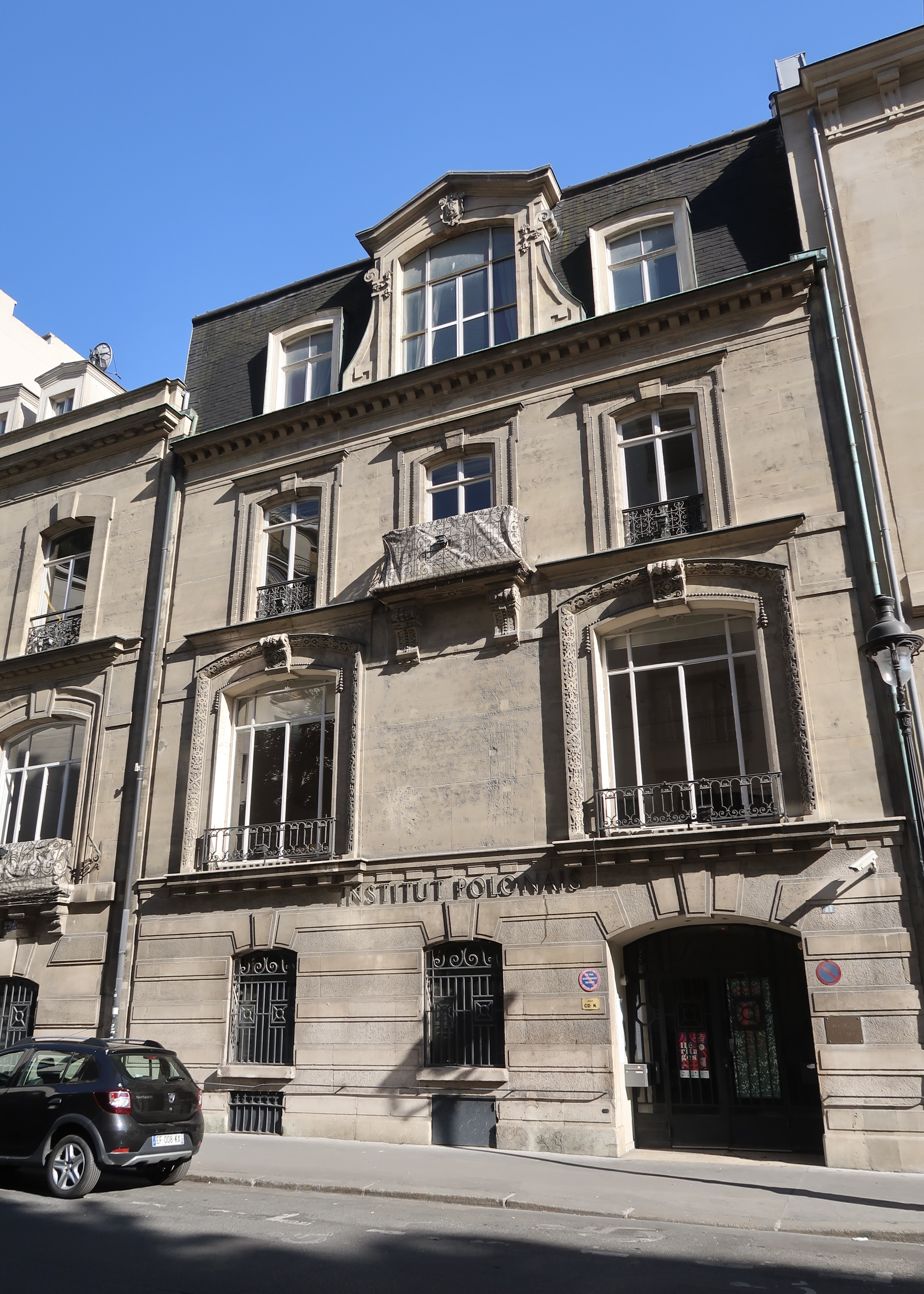
Polish Institute, 31 rue Jean-Goujon

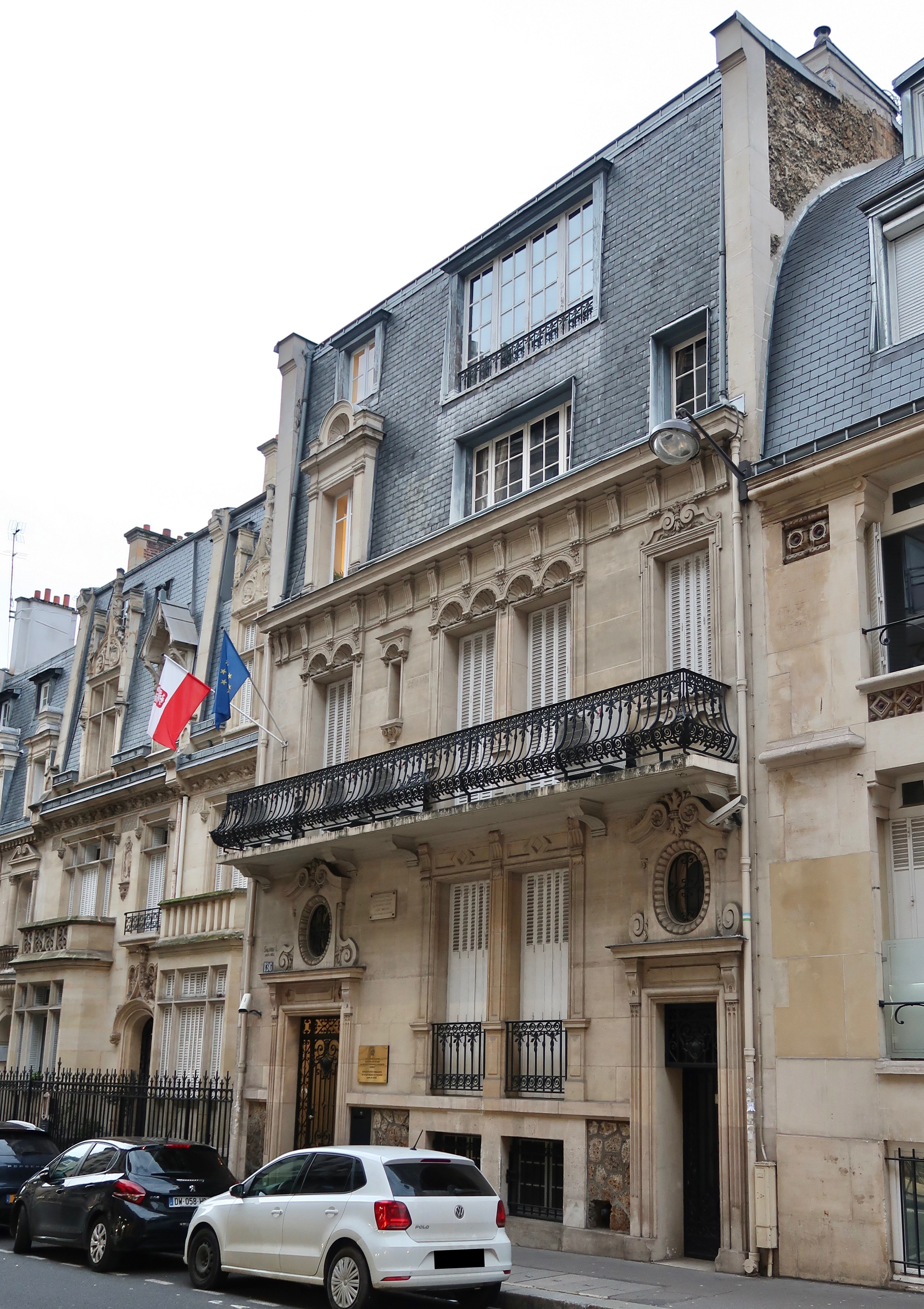
Permanent Representation of Poland to the OECD, 136 rue de Longchamp

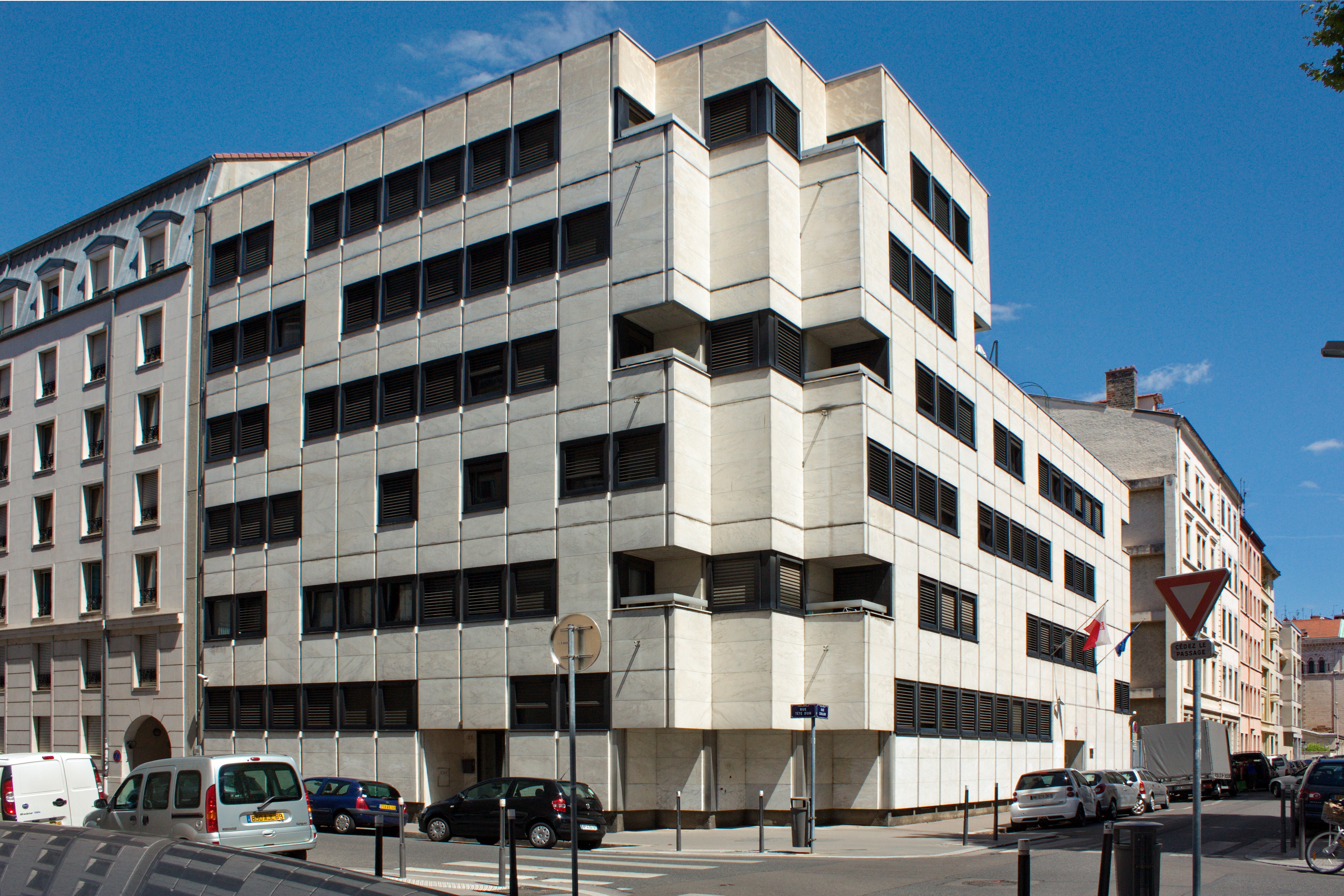
Polish Consulate-General, Lyon

== See also ==
- France-Poland relations
- List of diplomatic missions of Poland
- Foreign relations of Poland
- List of ambassadors of Poland to France
