= Tadeusz Olechowski =

Polish communist politician and ambassador

Tadeusz Olechowski (10 January 1926, Vilnius – 4 January 2001, Warsaw) was a Polish communist politician, Polish ambassador to various countries from 1960s to 1980s (France, 1969–1972 and 1976–1980, Egypt, 1972–1974, West Germany, 1983–1986), Minister of Foreign in 1972, viceminister of Foreign Affairs (1965–1969, 1980–1983 and 1986–1988), last minister of foreign affairs of the People's Republic of Poland (1988–1989).
