= Ministry of Foreign Affairs (Poland) =

Government ministry of Poland

- Ministerstwo Spraw Zagranicznych
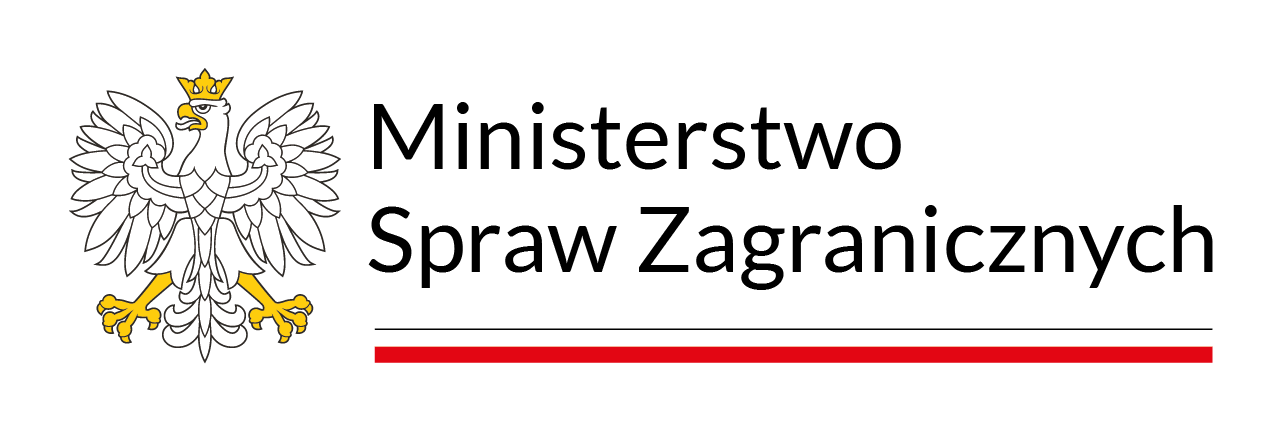
- Ministerial logotype

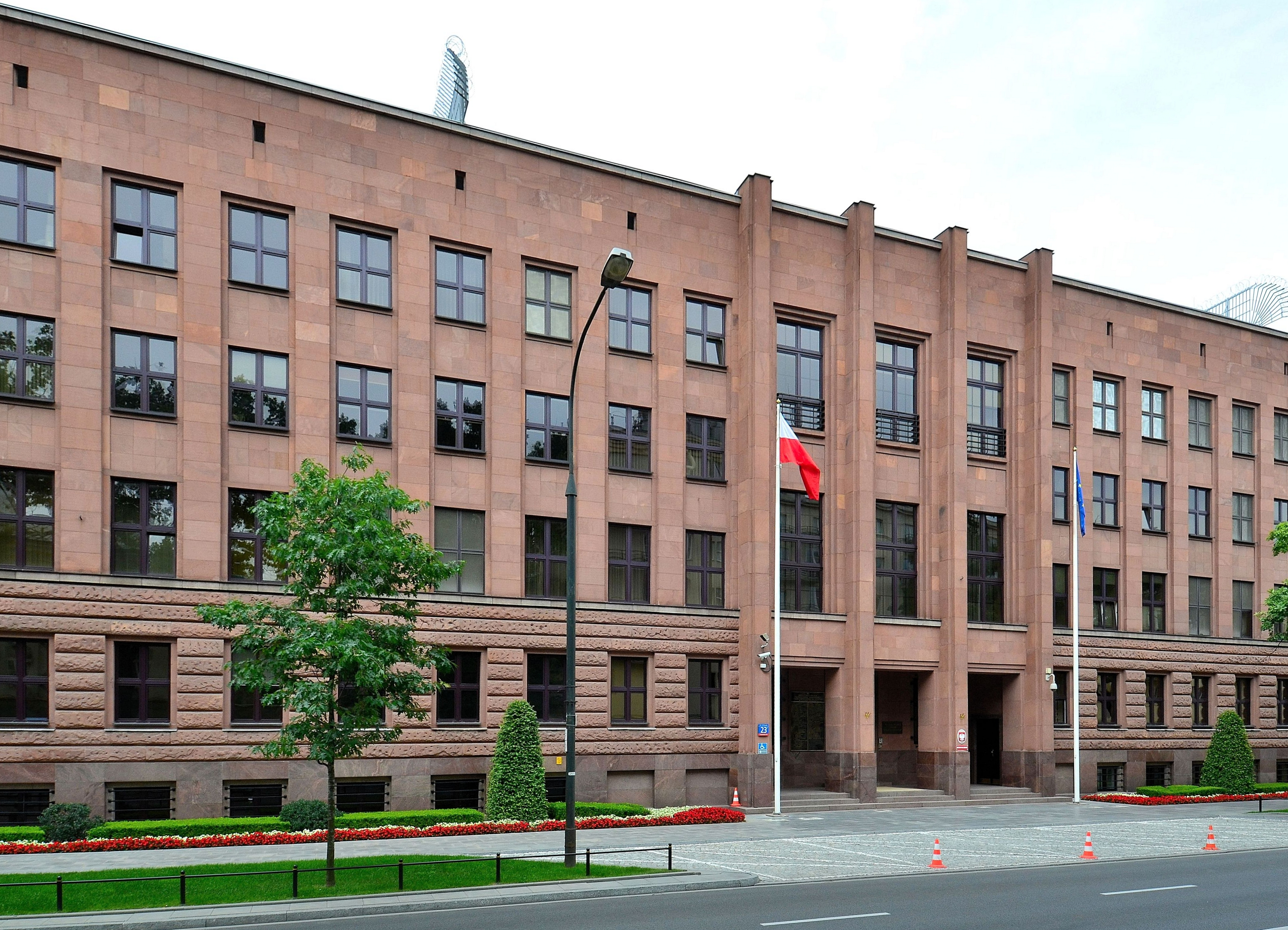
- The current seat of the Ministry of Foreign Affairs, located on Szucha Avenue

Agency overview
- Headquarters: Al. J. Ch. Szucha 23, Warsaw
- Agency executive: Radosław Sikorski, Minister of Foreign Affairs; First Deputy Minister (Sekretarz Stanu); First Deputy Minister (Sekretarz Stanu)
- Parent agency: Council of Ministers
- Website: www.gov.pl/diplomacy

The Ministry of Foreign Affairs (Ministerstwo Spraw Zagranicznych, MSZ) is the Polish government department tasked with maintaining Poland's international relations and coordinating its participation in international and regional supra-national political organisations such as the European Union and United Nations. The head of the ministry holds a place in the Council of Ministers.

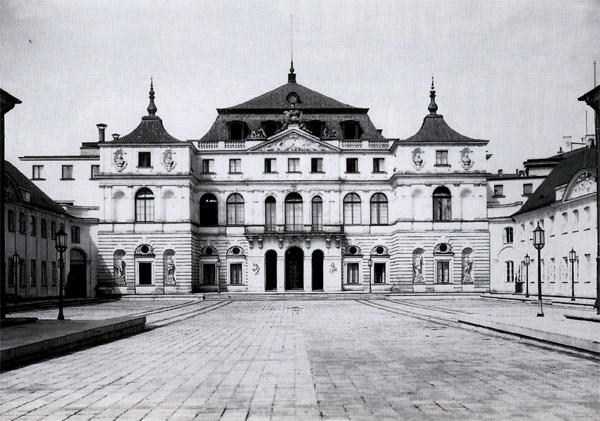
During the inter-war period the Ministry of Foreign Affairs was housed in the rococo Brühl Palace in central Warsaw

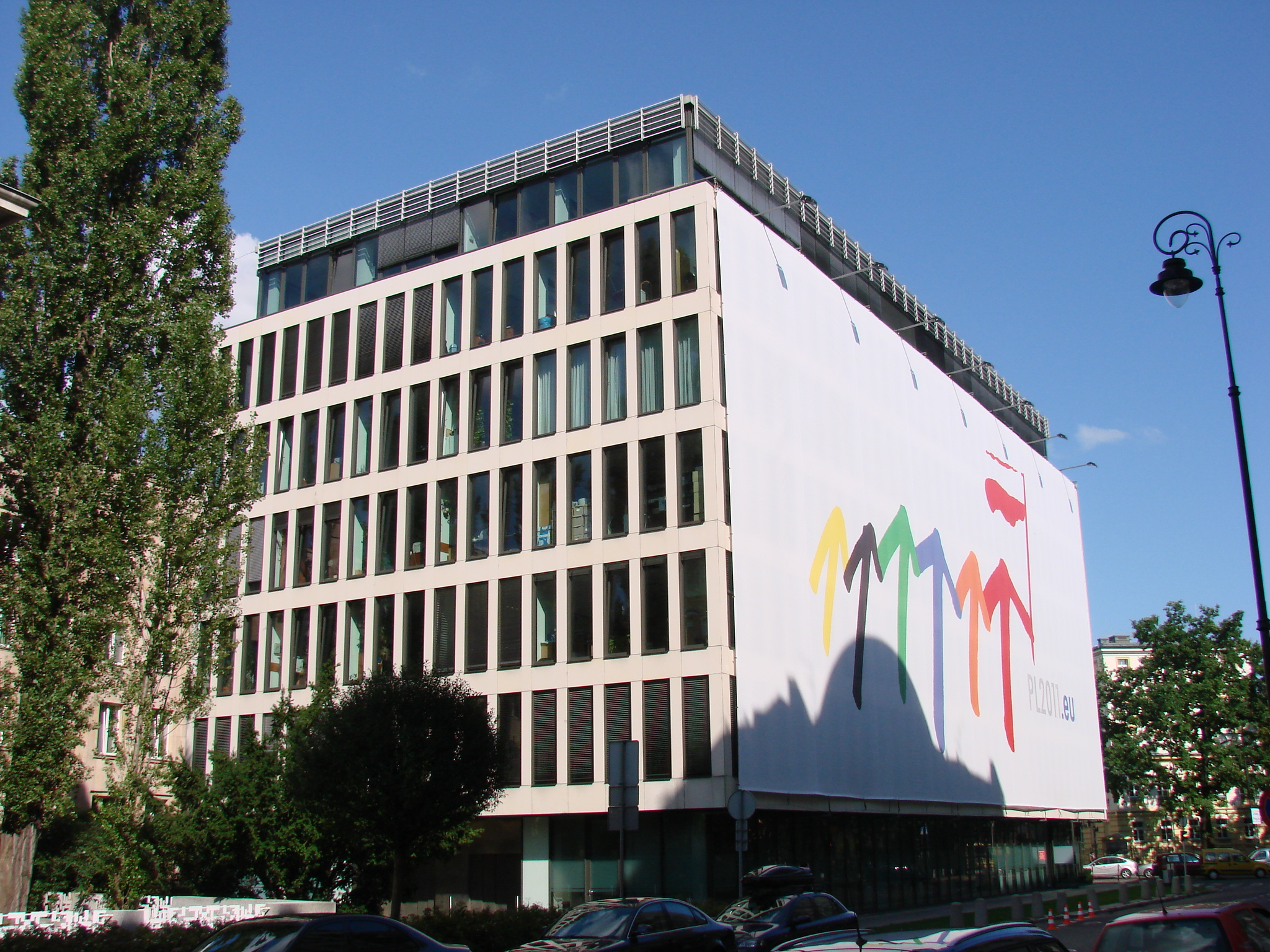
The MSZ's new extension, Articom office building at 21 Szucha Avenue, which in 2011 displayed a large-scale version of Poland's, then-presidency of the Council of the European Union

== Remits and responsibilities of the ministry ==
The Ministry of Foreign Affairs is responsible primarily for maintaining friendly relations between the Polish Republic and other states. In doing so, it is required to act primarily as a representative of the Polish people. To this end, all Polish diplomatic missions around the world are subordinate to the Ministry of Foreign Affairs. Ambassadors, whilst receiving their credentials from the President of Poland, are employees of the ministry and are recommended to the President for their posts by the minister of foreign affairs.

The ministry is considered to be one of Poland's most important, with the minister of foreign affairs ranking amongst the most influential people in Polish politics. This position is typically reserved for seasoned, professional politicians, and is thought to require a great deal of tact and intellect.

== History ==
The Ministry of Foreign Affairs was first established, with Leon Wasilewski as its secretary, under the authority of the Regency Council when Poland regained (albeit in name only) its independence from the occupying German forces in the First World War. However, the ministry began to fulfill its duties truly only after the fall of the Regency Council, adoption of the Treaty of Versailles and the rise of Józef Piłsudski. The ministry was then, until 1939, located in central Warsaw, with its seat in the Brühl Palace on Piłsudski Square. During the Second World War, the ministry was evacuated, along with the rest of the Polish government, first to France and then to London, where it formed part of the Polish government in exile. During this period Count Edward Raczyński, a man who was later to become President of the government in exile, was the minister responsible. After 1945, when most countries began to afford diplomatic recognition to the new communist government in Warsaw, at the expense of the government in exile, the authorities of the new Polish People's Republic refounded the ministry and appointed, as its first minister, Edward Osóbka-Morawski.

Since 1989 and the establishment of the Third Republic, the ministry and its staff have been located in a complex of buildings on Aleje Szucha in central Warsaw, not far displaced from the Chancellery of the Prime Minister.

The Polish cash-for-visa scandal is a 2023 political scandal concerning alleged corruption when granting visas by officials of the Ministry of Foreign Affairs and the Polish consular service. The majority of recipients left Poland for North America or other Schengen Area countries.

== Structure ==
=== Regional affairs departments ===
The departments for regional affairs exist to monitor the internal situation and politics of the countries within the area of any one specific department's competence. They coordinate development of bilateral relations, initiate the related undertakings and prepare evaluations. These departments oversee the issue of Poland's participation in the structures of multilateral cooperation with any relevant partner states, as well as handling interregional cooperation. They are responsible for the substantive activity of relevant Polish diplomatic missions abroad.

Currently the Following regional affairs departments exist:

- Administration Office
- Asia-Pacific Department
- Bureau for the Protection of Classified Information
- Bureau of Archives and Information Management
- Bureau of Control and Audit
- Bureau of Finances
- Bureau of Human Resources
- Bureau of Infrastructure
- Department for Cooperation with Polish Diaspora and Poles Abroad
- Department for Proceedings before International Human Rights Protection Bodies
- Department of Africa and the Middle East
- Department of Consular Affairs
- Department of Development Cooperation
- Department of Economic Cooperation
- Department of European Union Law
- Department of Foreign Policy Strategy
- Department of Public and Cultural Diplomacy
- Department of the Americas
- Department of the Committee for European Affairs
- Department of United Nations and Human Rights
- Diplomatic Protocol
- Director General's Office
- Eastern Department
- EU Economic Department
- European Policy Department
- Information Technology and Telecommunication Office
- Inspectorate of the Foreign Service
- Legal and Treaty Department
- MFA Press Office
- Minister's Secretariat
- Operations Centre
- Political Director's Office
- Security Policy Department

== Official Development Assistance ==
The largest proportion of Poland’s official development assistance (ODA) is provided as core contributions to the multilateral system, particularly to European Union (EU) institutions. According to the OECD, Poland’s total ODA (USD 3.4 billion, preliminary data) increased in 2022, representing 0.51% of gross national income (GNI), driven by a surge in in-donor refugee costs, but also higher contributions to international organisations.

== Ministers of Foreign Affairs (since 1989) ==
Minister of Foreign Affairs
- Minister Spraw Zagranicznych
- Incumbent; Radosław Sikorski since 13 December 2023
- Formation: 26 November 1917
- First holder: Leon Wasilewski
- Website: www.msz.gov.pl

Political Party: PO PiS SLD UW Independent

| Portrait | Name (Birth–Death) | Party | Term of office | | Prime Minister | (Cabinet) |
|---|---|---|---|---|---|---|
| | Krzysztof Skubiszewski (1926–2010) | Independent | 12 September 1989 | 12 January 1991 | Tadeusz Mazowiecki | Mazowiecki |
| | Krzysztof Skubiszewski (1926–2010) | Independent | 12 January 1991 | 23 December 1991 | Jan Krzysztof Bielecki | Bielecki |
| | Krzysztof Skubiszewski (1926–2010) | Independent | 23 December 1991 | 5 June 1992 | Jan Olszewski | Olszewski |
| | Krzysztof Skubiszewski (1926–2010) | Independent | 11 July 1992 | 25 October 1993 | Hanna Suchocka | Suchocka |
| | Andrzej Olechowski (1947–2026) | Independent | 26 October 1993 | 6 March 1995 | Waldemar Pawlak | Pawlak II |
| | Władysław Bartoszewski (1922–2015) | Independent | 7 March 1995 | 22 December 1995 | Józef Oleksy | Oleksy |
| | Dariusz Rosati (born 1946) | SLD | 29 December 1995 | 7 February 1996 | Józef Oleksy | Oleksy |
| | Dariusz Rosati (born 1946) | SLD | 7 February 1996 | 31 October 1997 | Włodzimierz Cimoszewicz | Cimoszewicz |
| | Bronisław Geremek (1932–2008) | UW | 31 October 1997 | 30 June 2000 | Jerzy Buzek | Buzek |
| | Władysław Bartoszewski (1922–2015) | Independent | 30 June 2000 | 19 October 2001 | Jerzy Buzek | Buzek |
| | Włodzimierz Cimoszewicz (born 1950) | SLD | 19 October 2001 | 2 May 2004 | Leszek Miller | Miller |
| | Włodzimierz Cimoszewicz (born 1950) | SLD | 2 May 2004 | 11 June 2004 | Marek Belka | Belka I |
| | Włodzimierz Cimoszewicz (born 1950) | SLD | 11 June 2004 | 5 January 2005 | Marek Belka | Belka II |
| | Adam Daniel Rotfeld (born 1938) | Independent | 5 January 2005 | 31 October 2005 | Marek Belka | Belka II |
| | Stefan Meller (1942–2008) | Independent | 31 October 2005 | 9 May 2006 | Kazimierz Marcinkiewicz | Marcinkiewicz |
| | Anna Fotyga (born 1957) | PiS | 9 May 2006 | 14 July 2006 | Kazimierz Marcinkiewicz | Marcinkiewicz |
| | Anna Fotyga (born 1957) | PiS | 14 July 2006 | 16 November 2007 | Jarosław Kaczyński | Kaczyński |
| | Radosław Sikorski (born 1963) | PO | 16 November 2007 | 18 November 2011 | Donald Tusk | Tusk I |
| | Radosław Sikorski (born 1963) | PO | 18 November 2011 | 22 September 2014 | Donald Tusk | Tusk II |
| | Grzegorz Schetyna (born 1963) | PO | 22 September 2014 | 16 November 2015 | Ewa Kopacz | Kopacz |
| | Witold Waszczykowski (born 1957) | PiS | 16 November 2015 | 11 December 2017 | Beata Szydło | Szydło |
| | Witold Waszczykowski (born 1957) | PiS | 11 December 2017 | 9 January 2018 | Mateusz Morawiecki | Morawiecki I |
| | Jacek Czaputowicz (born 1956) | Independent | 9 January 2018 | 15 November 2019 | Mateusz Morawiecki | Morawiecki I |
| | Jacek Czaputowicz (born 1956) | Independent | 15 November 2019 | 20 August 2020 | Mateusz Morawiecki | Morawiecki II |
| | Zbigniew Rau (born 1955) | PiS | 20 August 2020 | 27 November 2023 | Mateusz Morawiecki | Morawiecki II |
| | Szymon Szynkowski vel Sęk (born 1982) | PiS | 27 November 2023 | 13 December 2023 | Mateusz Morawiecki | Morawiecki III |
| | Radosław Sikorski (born 1963) | PO | 13 December 2023 | Incumbent | Donald Tusk | Tusk III |

== Previous officeholders ==
Kingdom of Poland (1917–1918)

- Wojciech Rostworowski (26 November 1917 – 27 February 1918) (Director of the Department of Political Affairs)
- Janusz Radziwiłł (4 April 1918 – 23 October 1918) (Director of the Department of State)
- Stanisław Głąbiński (23 October 1918 – 4 November 1918) (Minister for Outside Affairs)

Second Polish Republic

- Leon Wasilewski (17 November 1918 – 16 January 1919)
- Ignacy Jan Paderewski (16 January 1919 – 9 December 1919)
- Władysław Wróblewski (13 December 1919 – 16 December 1919)
- Stanisław Patek (16 December 1919 – 9 June 1920)
- Eustachy Sapieha (23 June 1920 – 24 May 1921)
- Jan Dąbski (24 May 1921 – 11 June 1921)
- Konstanty Skirmunt (11 June 1921 – 6 June 1922)
- Gabriel Narutowicz (18 June 1922 – 14 December 1922)
- Aleksander Skrzyński (16 December 1922 – 26 May 1923)
- Marian Seyda (28 May 1923 – 27 October 1923)
- Roman Dmowski (27 October 1923 – 14 December 1923)
- Karol Bertoni (19 December 1923 – 19 January 1924)
- Maurycy Zamoyski (19 January 1924 – 27 July 1924)
- Aleksander Skrzyński (27 July 1924 – 5 May 1926)
- Kajetan Dzierżykraj-Morawski (10 May 1926 – 15 May 1926)
- August Zaleski (15 May 1926 – 2 November 1932)
- Józef Beck (2 November 1932 – 30 September 1939)

Polish government-in-exile

The Polish government-in-exile had a wide international recognition until 1945, and limited to just few countries until the 1970s

- August Zaleski (30 September 1939 – 25 July 1941)
- Edward Raczyński (22 August 1941 – 14 July 1943)
- Tadeusz Romer (14 July 1943 – 24 November 1944)
- Adam Tarnowski (29 November 1944 – 10 February 1949)
- Mieczysław Sokołowski (7 April 1949 – 8 December 1953)
- Aleksander Zawisza (8 August 1955 – 11 June 1970)
- Jerzy Gawenda (20 July 1970 – 14 July 1972)
- Jan Starzewski (18 July 1972 – 15 December 1973)
- Bronisław Hełczyński (17 January 1974 – 15 July 1976)
- Zygmunt Zawadowski (5 August 1976 – 1 September 1979)
- Kazimierz Sabbat (1 September 1979 – 7 April 1986)
- Zygmunt Szkopiak (1986 – 20 December 1990)

Republic of Poland / Polish People's Republic

- Edward Osóbka-Morawski (21 July 1944 – 2 May 1945)
- Wincenty Rzymowski (2 May 1945 – 5 February 1947)
- Zygmunt Modzelewski (6 February 1947 – 20 March 1951)
- Stanisław Skrzeszewski (20 March 1951 – 27 April 1956)
- Adam Rapacki (27 April 1956 – 22 December 1968)
- Stefan Jędrychowski (22 December 1968 – 22 December 1971)
- Stefan Olszowski (22 December 1971 – 2 December 1976)
- Emil Wojtaszek (2 December 1976 – 24 August 1980)
- Józef Czyrek (24 August 1980 – 21 July 1982)
- Stefan Olszowski (21 July 1982 – 12 November 1985)
- Marian Orzechowski (12 November 1985 – 17 June 1988)
- Tadeusz Olechowski (17 June 1988 – 9 September 1989)

== See also ==
- Office for the Foreigners' Affairs
