= Gomułka =

Gomułka may refer to:

- Stanisław Gomułka (1940–2026), a Polish economist
- Władysław Gomułka (1905–1982), Polish communist leader
- Zofia Gomułka (1902–1986), communist activist, wife of Władysław Gomułka
- Gomułka thaw or Polish October, transitional period in Polish political history
- SŽ Class 311, Polish-built EMU trainsets, nicknamed after the Polish communist leader

== See also ==
- Mikołaj Gomółka, 16th century Polish composer
- Lenny Gomulka, American musician
- Alfred Gomolka, German politician
- Taras Gomulka, Australian soccer player
