= Independent Peasant Party =

Independent Peasant Party Niezależna Partia Chłopska
- Abbreviation: NPCh
- Leader: Alfred Fiderkiewicz
- Founded: 11 November 1924; 101 years ago
- Dissolved: 11 March 1927; 99 years ago
- Headquarters: Warsaw
- Youth wing: Association of Independent Academic Peasant Youth Orka
- Membership: 22,000
- Ideology: Marxism; Communism; Agrarian socialism Secularism
- Political position: Far-left

The Independent Peasant Party (Polish: Niezależna Partia Chłopska, NPCh) was a radical leftist Polish people's party founded in 1924 by a group of members of parliament from the Polish People's Party "Wyzwolenie". It was dissolved in 1927 by the state authorities.

== History and activities ==
On November 10, 1924, four members of parliament from the Polish People's Party "Wyzwolenie" (Liberation): Adolf Bon, Feliks Hołowacz, Antoni Szapiel, and Sylwester Wojewódzki, left the party's caucus and formed a new parliamentary caucus. One day later, this group, in a special proclamation, announced the formation of a new peasant party, which adopted the name "Independent Peasant Party." The name was coined by Feliks Hołowacz. Two more members joined the parliamentary caucus: Alfred Fiderkiewicz (head of the party's main board) and Włodzimierz Szakun.

The party adopted a radical platform consisting mainly of the following:

- Taking power through revolution and establishing a workers' and peasants' government
- Agrarian reform without compensation and nationalization of forests
- Separation of church and state
- Alliance with the Soviet Union

The party collaborated closely with the Polish Communist Party and Sel-Rob, with whom it also collaborated in the Sejm, submitting radical bills, including the June 26, 1925, draft bill on agrarian reform, which provided for the expropriation of large landed estates without compensation, the nationalization of forests, the division of expropriated land among agricultural workers, landless peasants, and smallholders, and the establishment of experimental farms on estates with high agricultural quality. In 1926, the party supported the May Coup d'état, but soon withdrew from this initiative.

At its peak, the party had over 20,000 members, mainly in the Lublin, Warsaw, and Kielce voivodeships. Its primary activists included: Sylwester Wojewódzki, Feliks Hołowacz, Bohdan de Nisau, Władysław Kowalski, Alfred Fiderkiewicz, Włodzimierz Szakun, Franciszek Błaszkiewicz, and Jan Rak. Władysław Gomułka was also a member of the NPCh, but he left in 1926 to join the Communist Party of Poland.

From 1925 to 1927, the Association of Independent Academic Peasant Youth Orka cooperated with the NPCh.

Press organs: "Wyzwolenie Ludu" (Liberation of the People), "Walka Ludu" (People's Struggle), "Walka Chłopska" (Peasant Struggle), "Walka Wsi" (Village Struggle), "Walka Pracy" (Labor Struggle), "Walka Oraczy" (Plowshare), "Nieległe Chłop" (Independent Peasant), "Nieleże Oracz"(Independent Plowshare), "Snop" (Sheaf), and "Zagon" (Arc). The party was forced to publish periodicals under changing titles to avoid repression related to the confiscation of periodicals and censorship.

Political opponents, primarily clerical and conservative groups, characterized the NPCh as demoralizing, godless, and Bolshevik. Before the party was banned, state police searched activists' homes, dispersed party meetings and parliamentary rallies, and confiscated party publications. In 1926, they arrested numerous NPCh activists and supporters.

In February 1927, in the Sejm, MP Adolf Bon refuted the accusations of state treason against the party. On March 11, the group was banned by a decree of the Minister of Internal Affairs. After several months of illegal existence, it resigned from further activity in 1928. It was replaced by a new party called the Union of the Peasant Left which was close to the communist movement .

== Bibliography ==
- Słownik historii Polski. Warszawa: Wydawnictwo „Wiedza Powszechna”. 1973.
- 100 lat polskiego ruchu robotniczego kronika wydarzeń. Warszawa: Książka i Wiedza. 1978.
- Czubiński, Antoni (1987). Najnowsze dzieje Polski 1914–1983. Państwowe Wydawnictwo Naukowe. ISBN 8301061375.
- Grzywna, Józef (1984). Zjednoczenie Lewicy Chłopskiej Samopomoc w woj. kieleckim w latach 1928–1931. Warszawa-Kraków.
- Fajkowski, Józef (1971). Krótki zarys historii ruchu ludowego. Warszawa: Ludowa Spółdzielnia Wydawnicza.
- Drogi rozwoju ruchu ludowego (in Polish). Warszawa: LSW. 1964.
- Dymek, Benon (1972). Niezależna Partia Chłopska 1924–1927. Warszawa: Książka i Wiedza.
