= Środula =

Neighborhood in Sosnowiec, Silesia

- Dzielnica
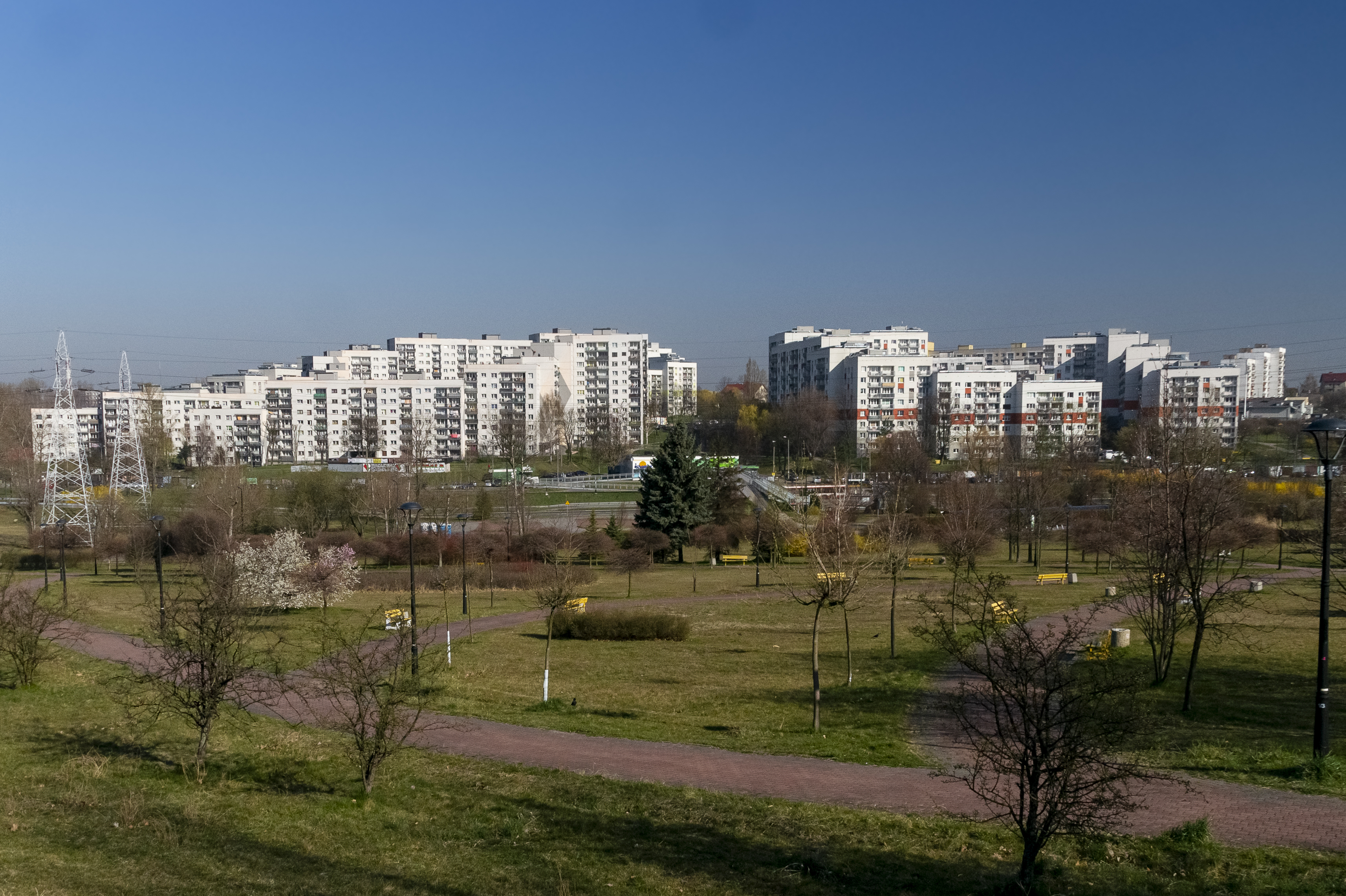
- View of Środula from across Środula Park
- Interactive map of Środula
- Coordinates: 50°17′46″N 19°09′21″E
- Country: Poland
- Voivodeship: Silesian
- City county: Sosnowiec
- Time zone: UTC+1 (CET)
  - Summer (DST): UTC+2 (CEST)
- SIMC: 0943701
- Vehicle registration: SO
- Primary airport: Katowice Airport

Środula is a district of Sosnowiec, Poland, within the Katowice urban area, located in the northern part of the city.

== History ==
Formerly a separate village, Środula was included within the city limits of Sosnowiec in 1915. In 1935, tram service was launched in Środula.

Following the German-Soviet invasion of Poland, which started World War II in September 1939, it was occupied by Germany until 1945. The occupiers established a prisoner-of-war camp in 1940 and a ghetto for Jews in 1942. In 1943, the ghetto was liquidated and the Jews were sent to extermination camps.

In 1952, the new Catholic parish of the Exaltation of the Holy Cross was established, covering Środula. In 1970s, most of the old architecture was demolished to be replaced with pre-fabricated apartment blocks. New tram lines linking Środula with the city center and Zagórze were opened in 1980 and 1982, respectively. In 1991, the State Agricultural Farm (PGR) began to be adapted into what is now a park and the venue of numerous athletic activities and cycling.

== Środula Park ==
Środula Park is one of Sosnowiec's parks, on a hillside with panoramic views of the city.

Replacing a former PGR, the park was opened in 1991 after extensive redevelopment. Further developments from 2002 to 2005 include an artificial ski slope and the addition of bicycle paths.

The park hosts a number of sporting events including athletics competitions, cycling events (including the Grand Prix of Sosnowiec in mountain biking), and school sports competitions.

== Notable people ==
Edward Gierek, a former leader of Poland (the 4th First Secretary of the Polish United Workers' Party) during the communist era, is buried in Środula.
