= Środula Park =

Park in Sosnowiec, Poland

- Park Środula
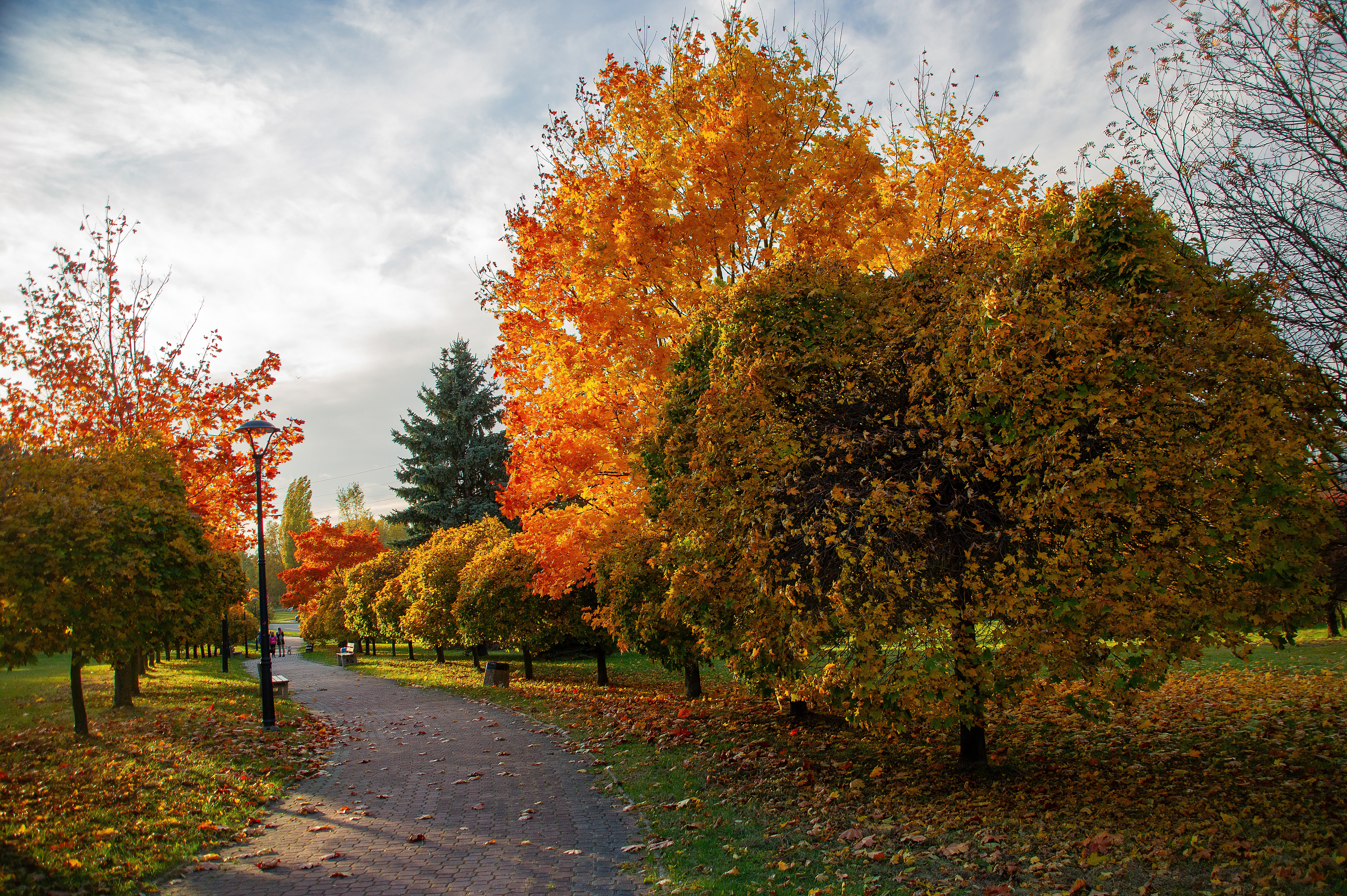
- Środula Park in autumn 2021
- Interactive map of Środula Park
- Location: Sosnowiec, Poland
- Coordinates: 50.2900°N 19.16325°E
- Area: 45 ha (110 acres)
- Established: 1991

Środula Park (Polish: Park Środula) is a municipal park in Sosnowiec, located at the end of 3 Maja Street, between the Środula district near Norwida Street, the Zagórze district near Blachnickiego Street, and gen. Zaruskiego Street. The park covers an area of 10.038 hectares in developed areas, and approximately 45 hectares with adjacent woodlands lacking regular paths. The entire park is situated on a hillside (295 m above sea level), with an artificial slope reaching a height of 319.5 m above sea level. The vast summit offers a panoramic view of the surrounding area.

At the foot of the hills, a line of old trees marks the course of an old road leading to Kraków, now Małe Zagórze Street. In the northeastern part, there is a small body of water. The park is covered with rows of low, trimmed shrubs and trees. The vegetation is entirely planted, with all plantings having been established in stages after 1991.

During the winter season, the park is used for skiing and snowboarding. In the summer, it is used for mountain biking, Nordic walking, mountainboarding, and running.

== Infrastructure ==
- Środula Ski Slope;
- Hiking and cycling paths;
- Outdoor gym;
- Street workout park for calisthenic exercises;
- Enclosed dog run with an area of 2,340 m^{2};
- Enclosed wooden playground for children;
- Jordan Garden with three zones divided by age category.
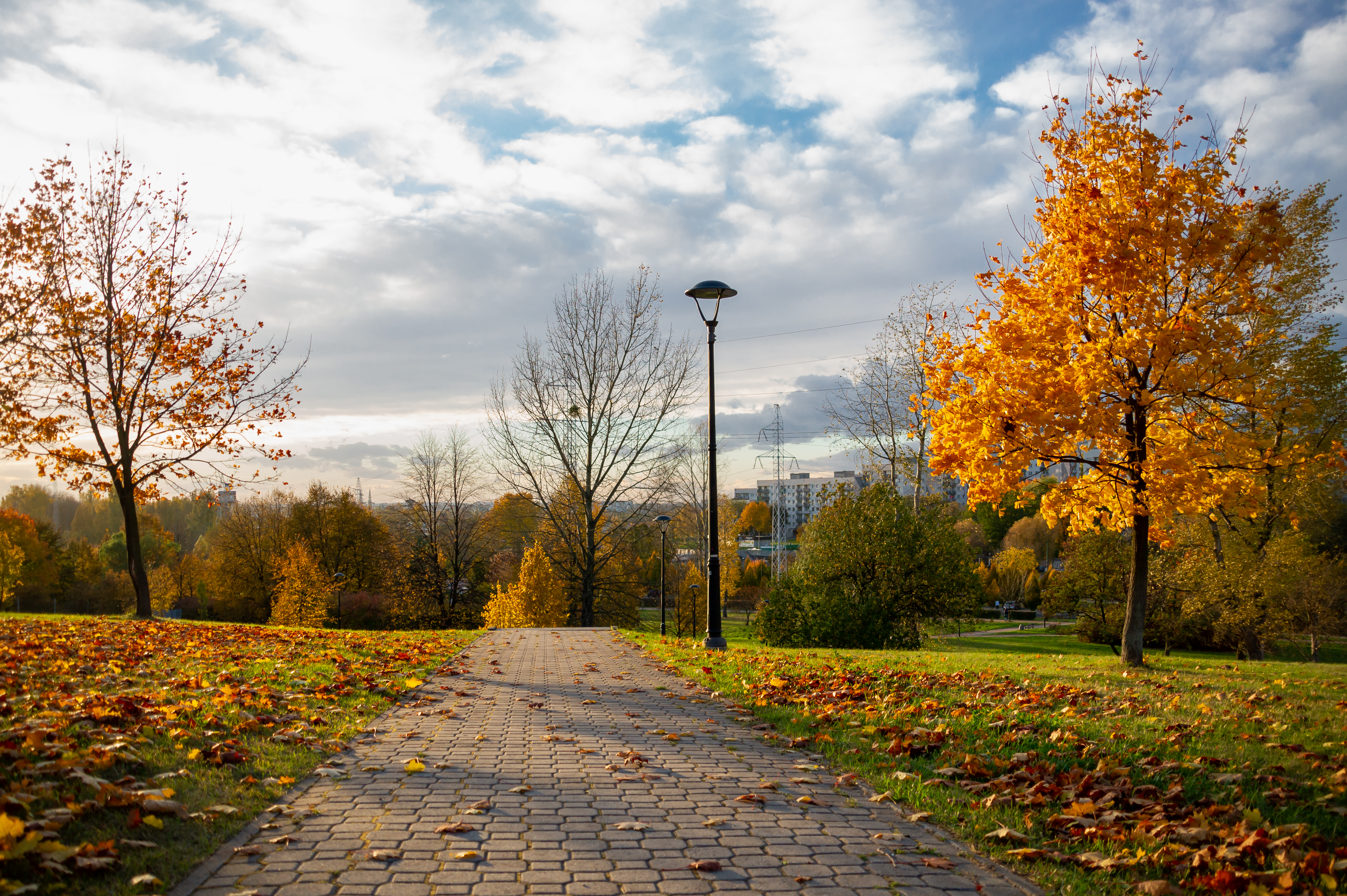
Autumn in the Park

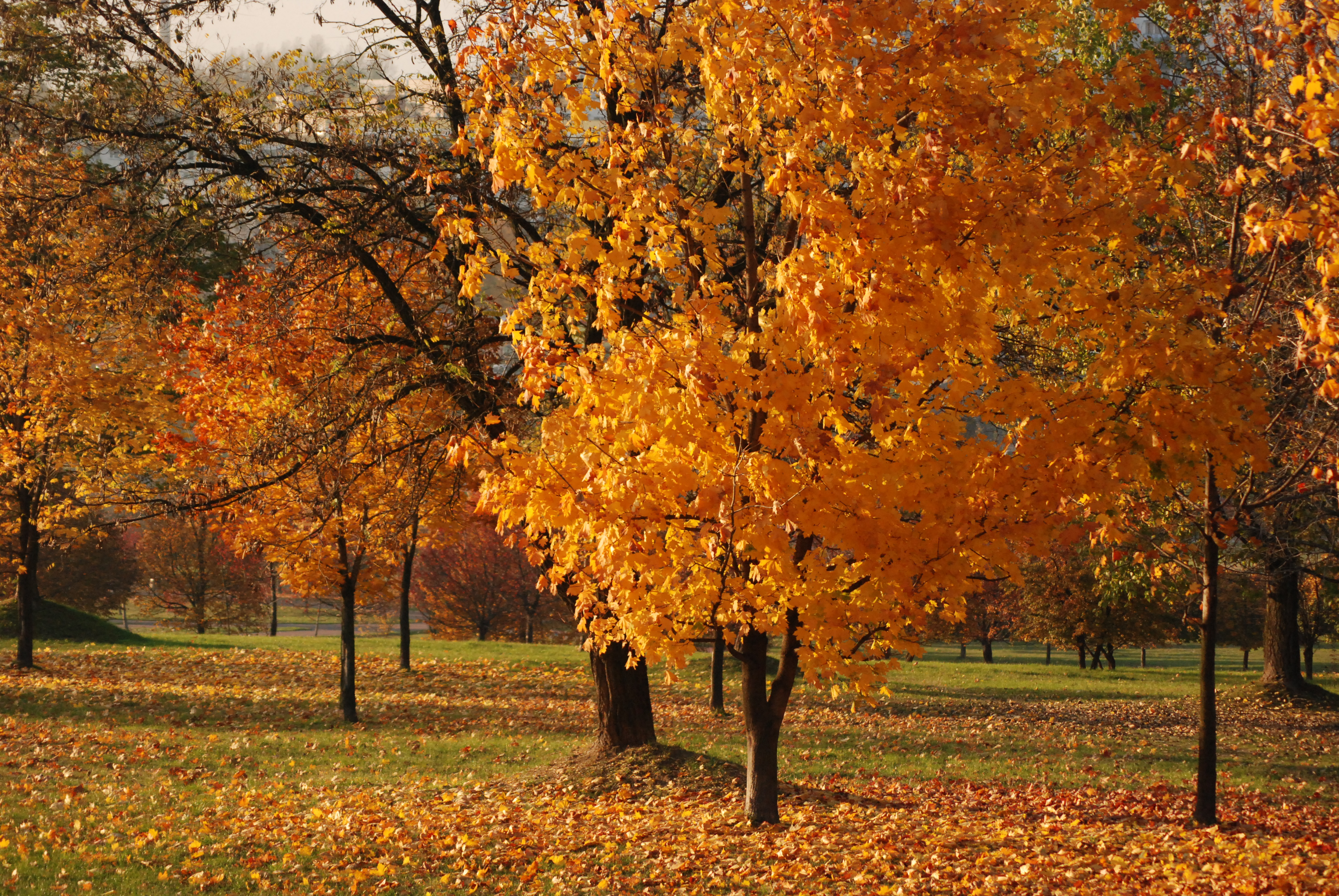
Autumn in the Park

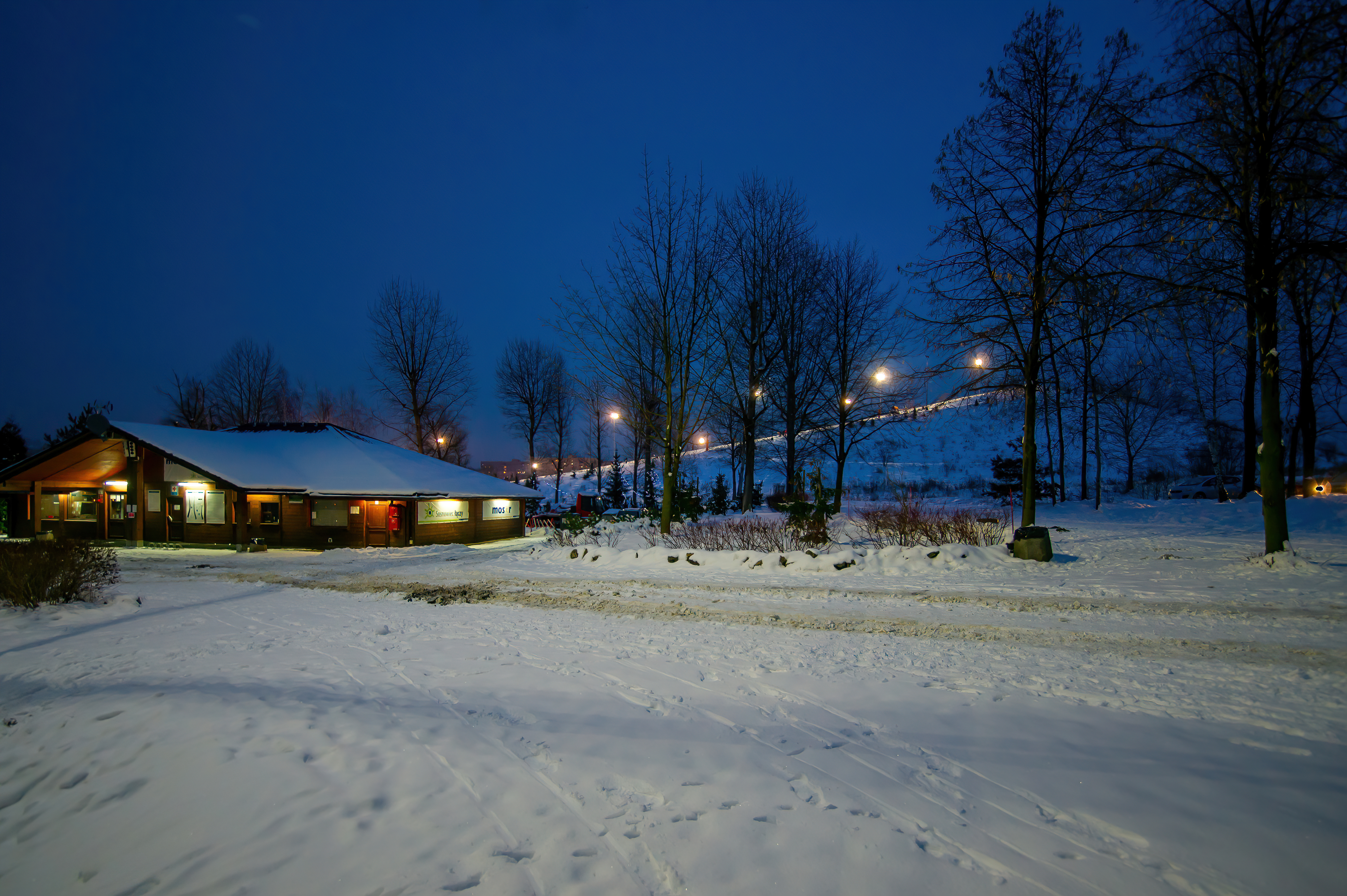
Ski resort

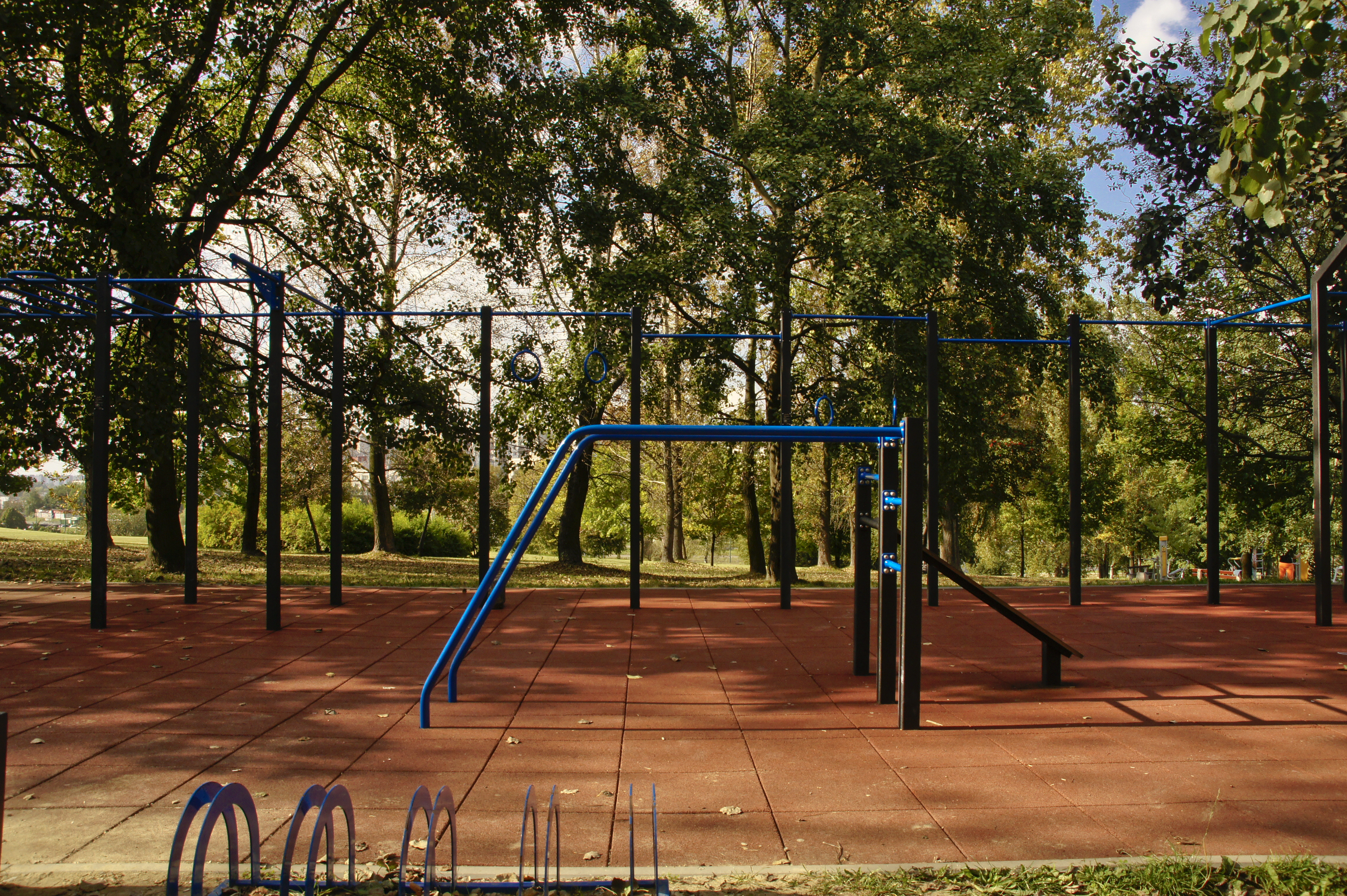
Street workout zone

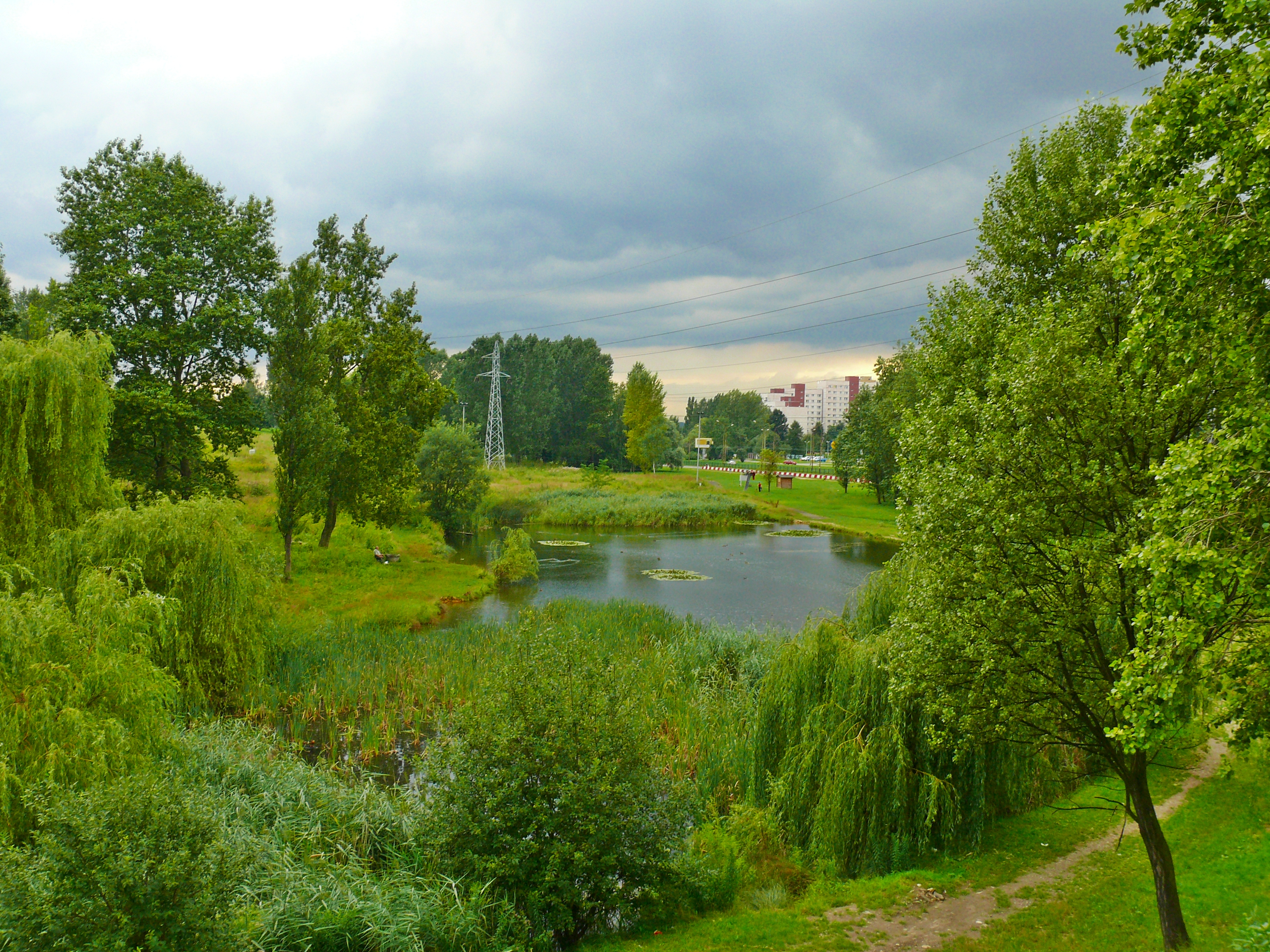
Forek pond

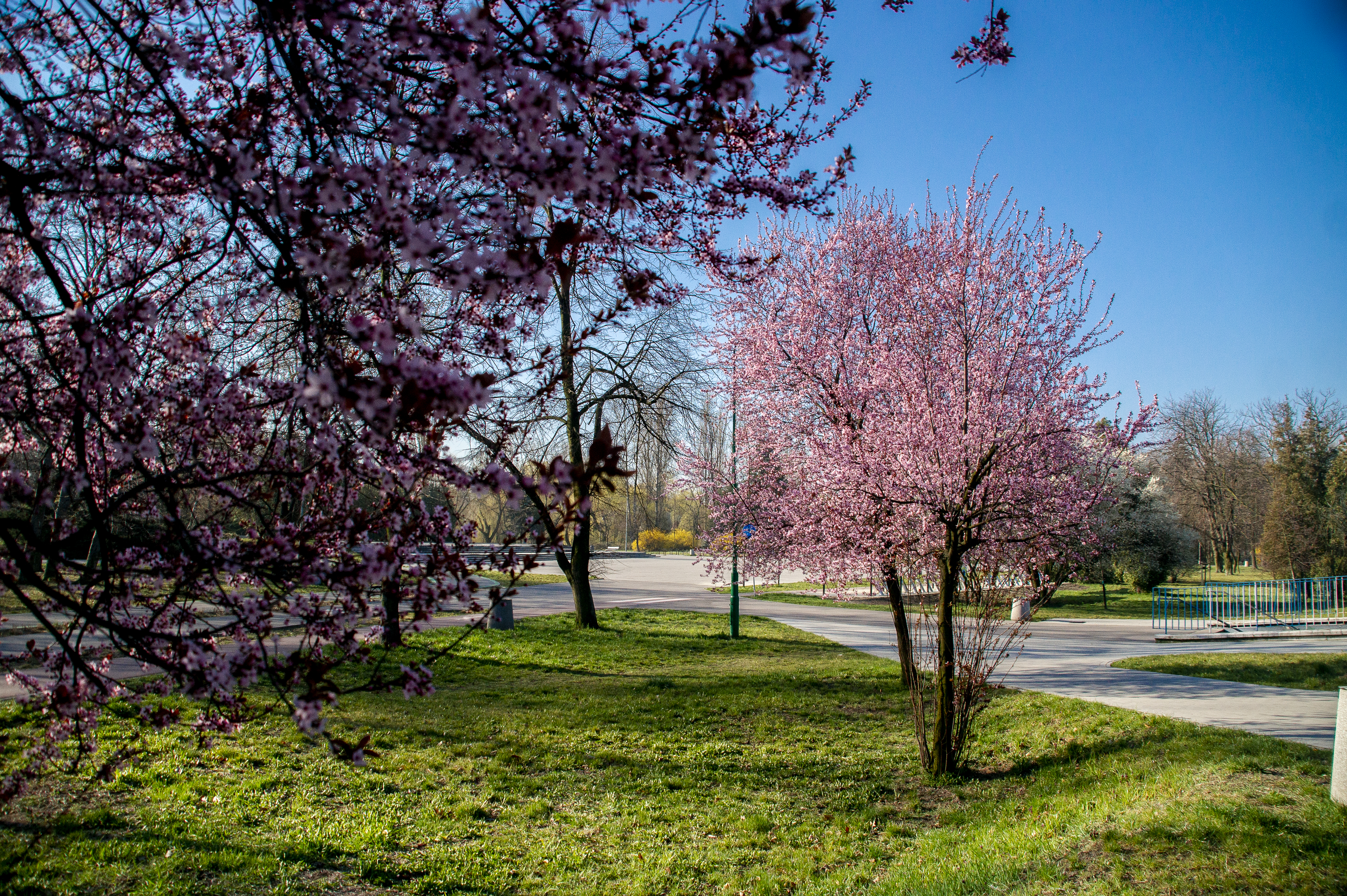
Spring in the park

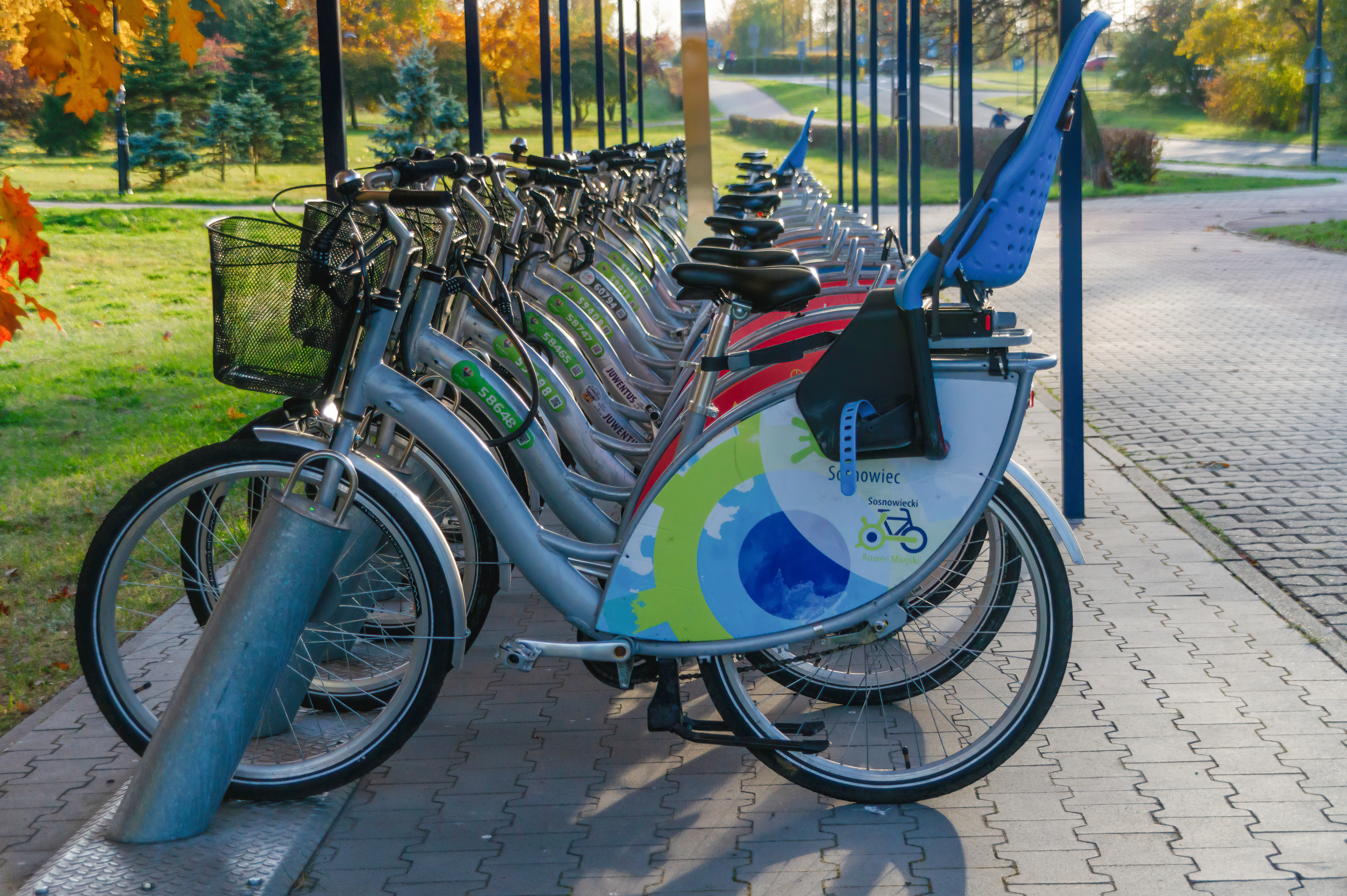
Station of the Sosnowiec City Bike

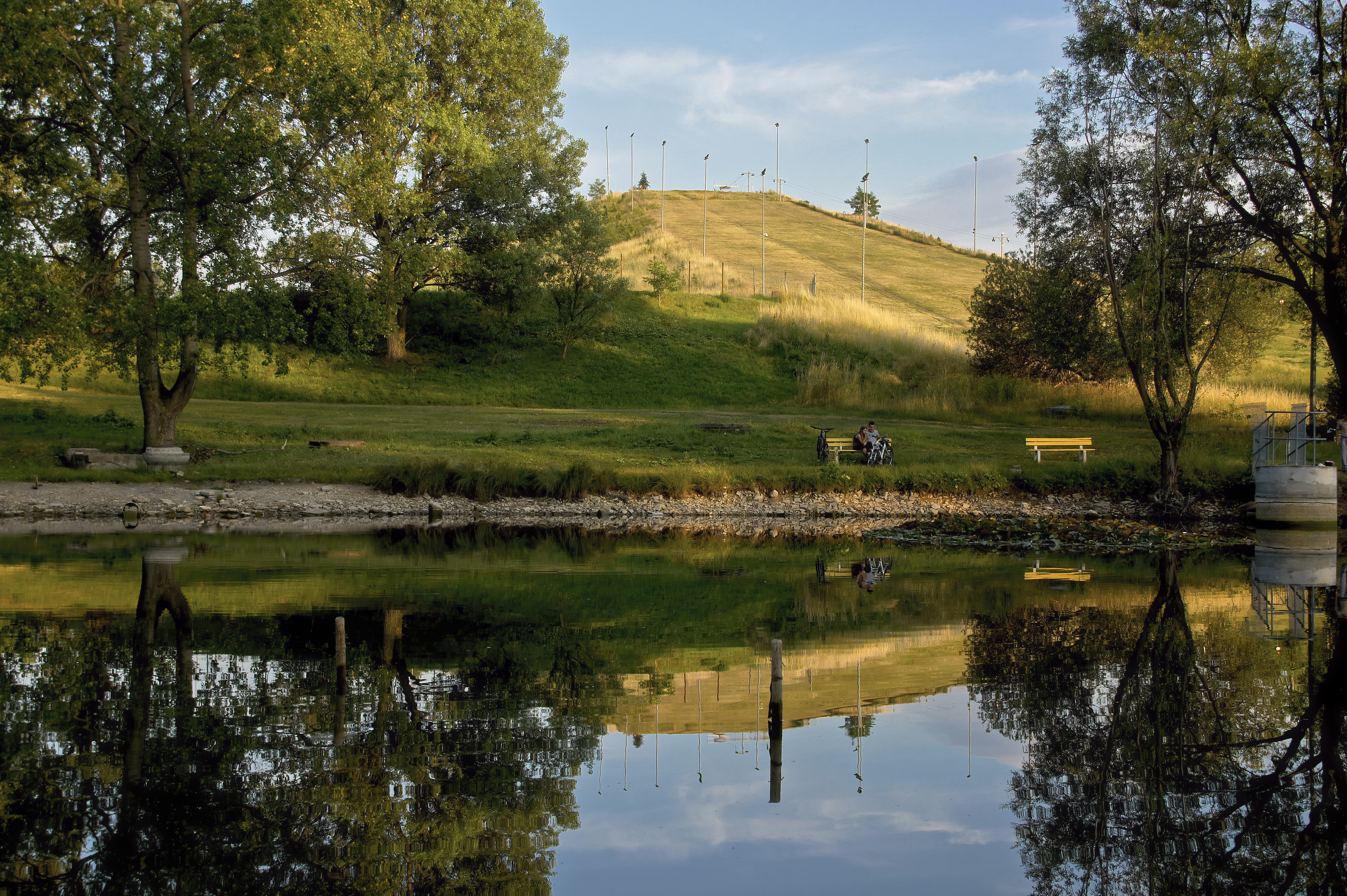
Górka Środulska with ski slope and Florek pond

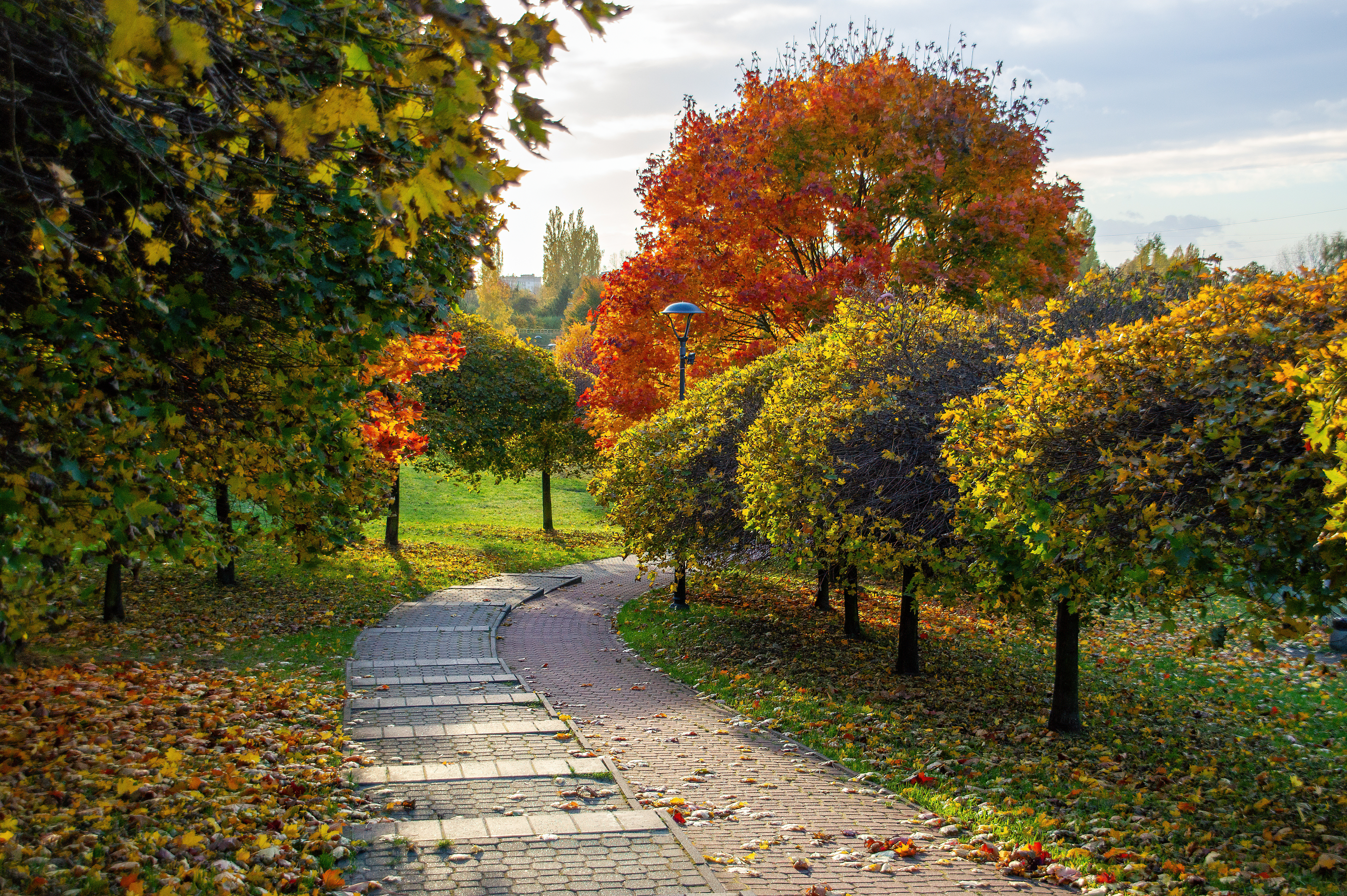

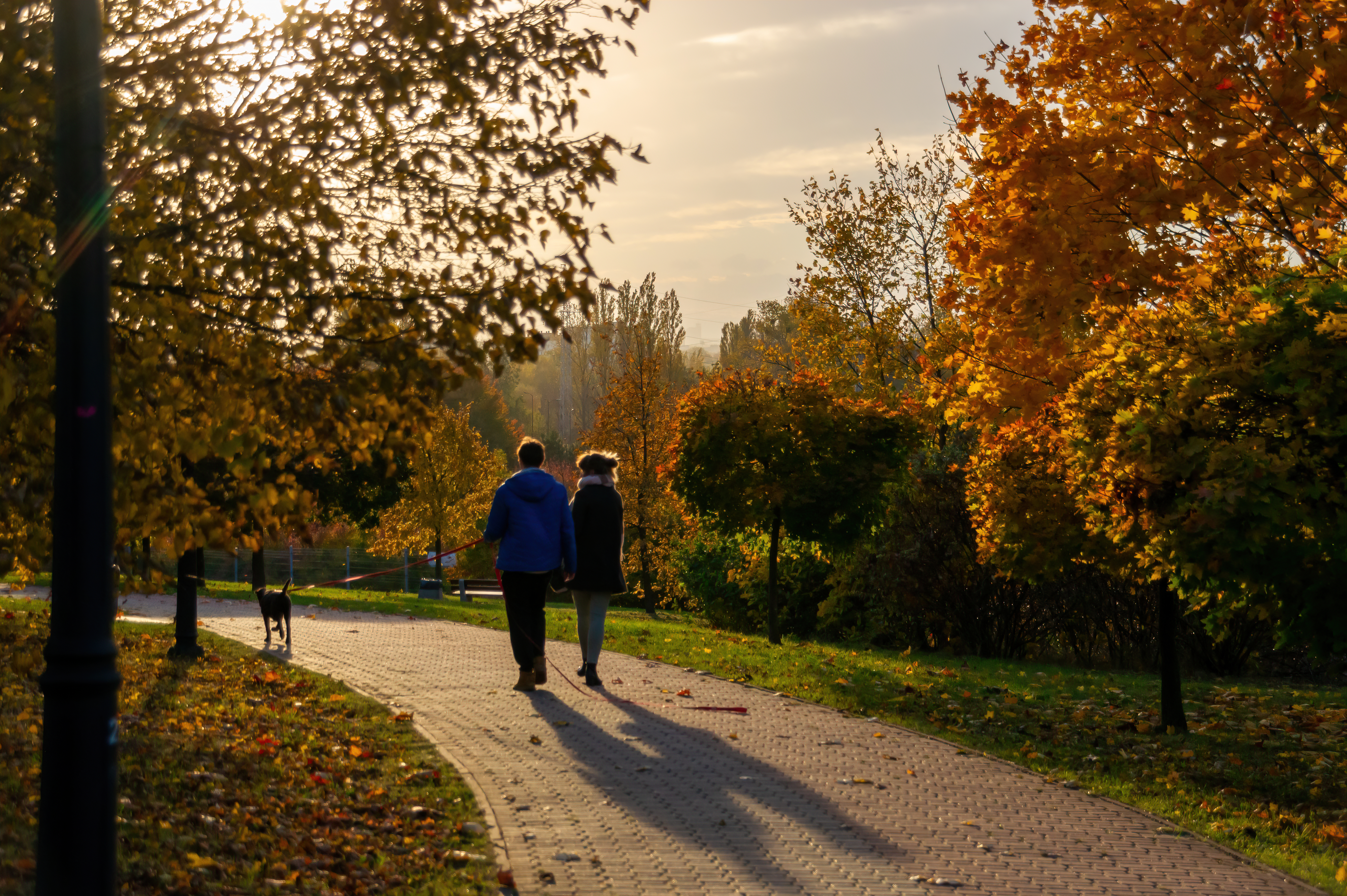

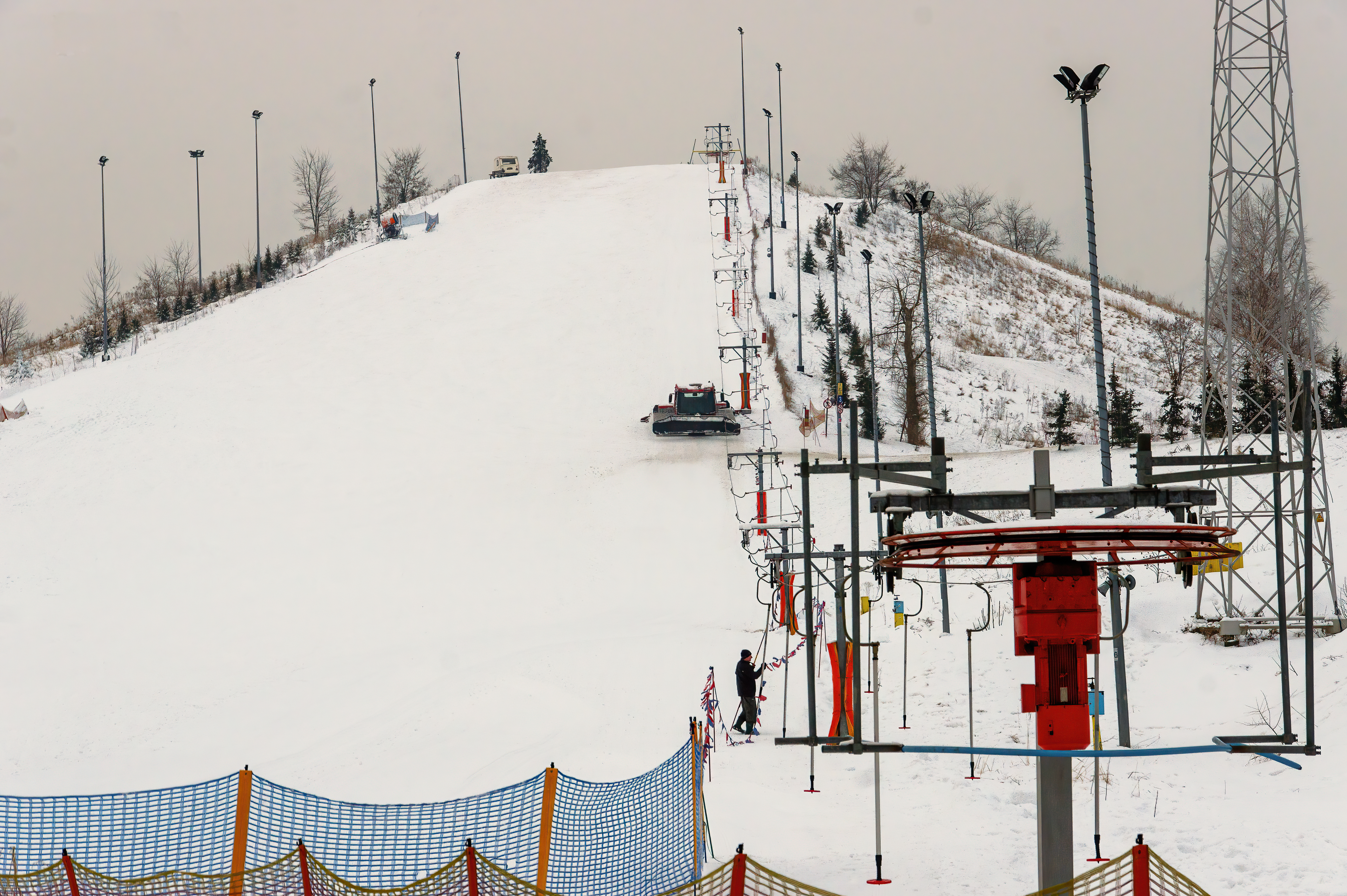

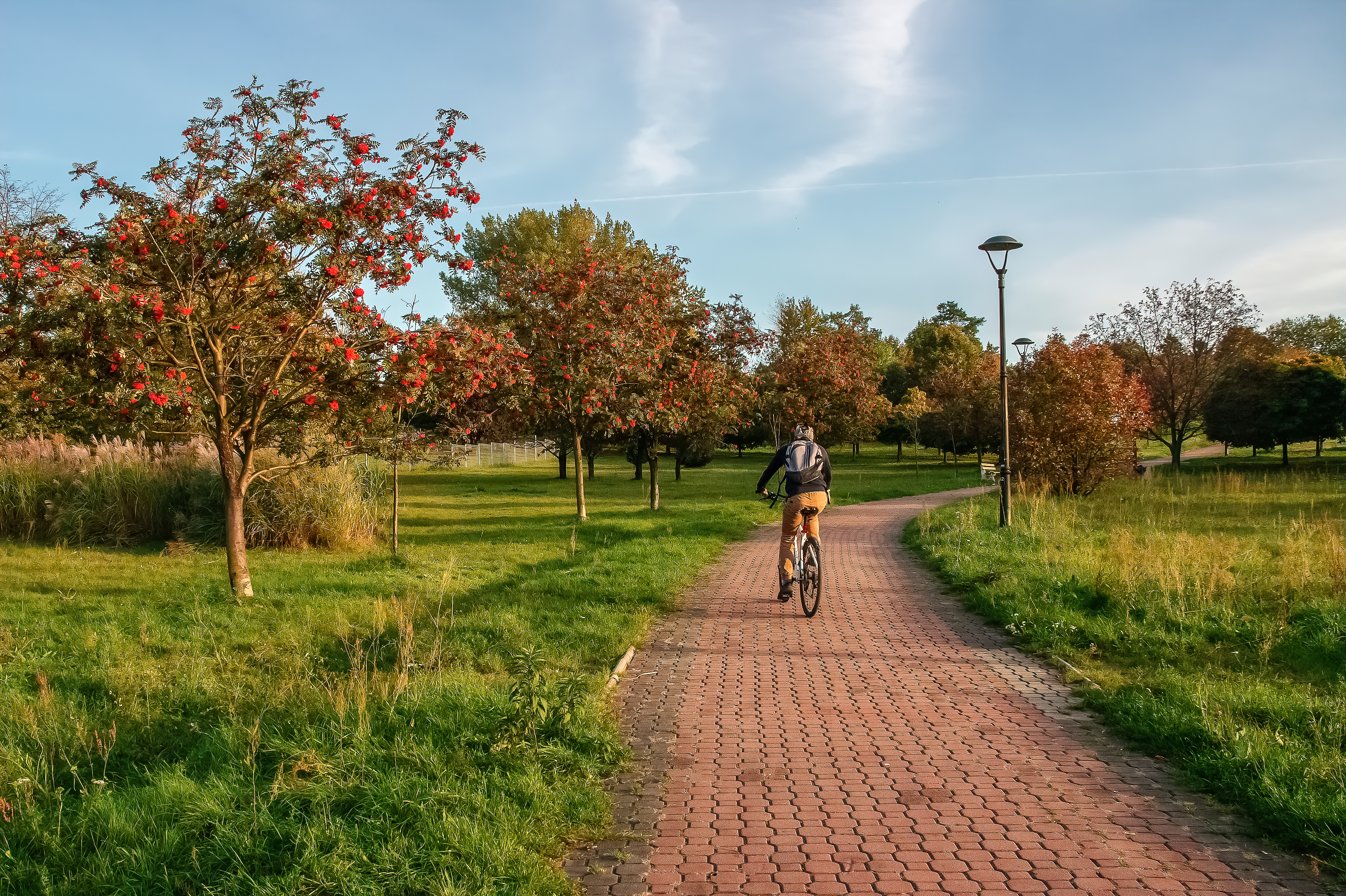

== History ==
The construction of the park as a regulated green area began in 1991 with the development of wasteland left over from the fields of a liquidated State Agricultural Farm. The trees planted then now form the basis of the park. Later, the path system was organized, where rows of trees were also planted. A playground for children was created, and the water reservoir – Florek Pond (a small pond), located in the park, was regulated and organized (drained in 2017).

Another modernization of the park was the construction of an artificial ski slope. The slope is 50 meters high from the base. About one million cubic meters of mining waste were used for its construction. The construction and leveling of the slope was completed at the turn of 2002 and 2003.

In June 2005, a tender for the development of the park was resolved. As a result of the tender, the first lift on the lower part of the slope was created in December 2005. In December 2006, the recreational and sports complex under the name Sportowa Dolina 2 was planned to be opened (ski lift, a specially prepared, illuminated slope, and a set of snow cannons). In 2010, the slope was taken over by the city and is now managed by the MOSiR (Municipal Sports and Recreation Center) in Sosnowiec.

In 2008, the modernization of the park's paths began. As part of the modernization, pedestrian and bicycle paths were created. The bicycle routes are connected to the bicycle route at Kombajnistów Street.

Further modernizations of the park include the construction of recreational and sports infrastructure in: 2012 – an outdoor gym, 2015 – a street workout zone, and the Palma Chillout culture zone, 2018 – the Jordan Garden.

In 2018, a bicycle path was built along 3 Maja Street, connecting the park with the bicycle route at Narutowicza Street and further to Ludwik Roundabout.

== Bibliography ==
- Projekt budowlano – wykonawczy: Remont alejek w Parku Środula w Sosnowcu (in Polish)
