= Stanisław Jaros =

Polish failed assassin (1932–1963)

- Born: Stanisław Jaros; January 19, 1932; Zagórze, Poland
- Died: January 5, 1963 (aged 30); Katowice, Poland
- Cause of death: Execution by hanging
- Known for: Assassination attempt of Soviet leader Nikita Khrushchev
- Status: Executed
- Conviction: Attempted murder
- Penalty: Death

Stanisław Jaros (January 19, 1932 – January 5, 1963) was a Polish electrician who was executed for carrying out two assassination attempts on Polish Communist leader Władysław Gomułka, and one attempt to kill Soviet leader Nikita Khrushchev.

== Biography ==
Jaros was born into a working-class family in Zagórze (now a district of Sosnowiec). There is no record of his graduation from any schools. He appears to have been self-taught. Unlike most Poles during the Communist era, he did not hold a permanent job, supporting himself mostly through services to the local population based on his knowledge of electromechanics. He lived in Zagórze with his mother and sister, and never married.

He worked sporadically at local coal mines and other enterprises from which he obtained explosives and fuses. He began to experiment with explosives in 1948, at the age of sixteen. After an attempt to steal 100 bullets from a boiler factory in Sosnowiec, he was caught and tortured by Milicja Obywatelska (MO) officers and sentenced to two years in prison.

After his release in 1951, he blew up telephone facilities in Dąbrowa Górnicza. Using stolen ammonite, he blew up a utility pole at Sosnowiec Steelworks, as well as an excavator at the Kazimierz Coal Mine in Sosnowiec. After Joseph Stalin's death in 1953, he planted a bomb under a transformer at the Joseph Stalin Coal Mine (formerly known as Renard Coal Mine) in Sosnowiec.

Jaros was cautious: His bombs did not kill anybody, he never left traces, and agents of Służba Bezpieczeństwa's local office in Katowice believed that an anti-government organization stood behind these incidents.

== First assassination attempt of Gomułka and Khrushchev ==
On July 5, 1959, the Trybuna Robotnicza (Worker's Tribune) newspaper published a map of the route of the motorcade, so that people would be able to greet the leaders. The officials travelled along Red Army Street (ulica Armii Czerwonej), the main artery of Zagórze. To honor the guests, local authorities adorned the street and buildings along it with flowers. Edward Jaros had several kilograms of ammonite – an explosive used for mining purposes – six hundred detonators, and 24 rings of mining fuses, which he had stolen from a coal mine in Upper Silesia. He placed the bomb on a lime tree, next to a Communist Police station. However, upon seeing crowds of people he hesitated, anticipating that the explosion would cause widespread destruction. Finally, the time bomb constructed by Jaros exploded at 3 pm, two hours before the arrival of the officials. The report of the investigation stated: "In the hours close to the planned arrival of the motorcade, a time bomb, planted on a tree exploded. There is no doubt that the target of the attempt was to kill members of the delegation. As a result of the explosion, the tree was partly destroyed, windows in several houses broke, and one person was slightly injured by shrapnel."

On July 15, 1959, a delegation of Polish and Soviet governments visited the industrial regions of Zagłębie Dąbrowskie and Upper Silesia. The delegation consisted of high-ranking officials, including Polish leader Władysław Gomułka, Soviet leader Nikita Khrushchev, and the First Secretary of the local office of the Polish Communist Party, Edward Gierek (born in Sosnowiec's district Porąbka). Khrushchev came to Poland to celebrate the 15th anniversary of the People's Republic of Poland (see July Manifesto), and Gierek served as his and Gomułka's guide.

Gomułka did not tell Khrushchev about the assassination attempt in order to hide it from him. The Soviet leader, however, found out about the event, most likely from KGB agents in Poland, and was annoyed with the Polish leader.

== Second assassination attempt of Gomulka ==
Jaros' second attempt took place on December 3, 1961, during Gomułka's visit to Sosnowiec. This time, the leader of the Polish Communist party came to the city to honor local coal miners, who celebrate Saint Barbara's Day (patron of coal miners) annually on December 4, known in Poland as Barbórka. Like in 1959, the schedule of the visit was published by "Trybuna Robotnicza", on December 1. Gomułka, together with other officials, planned to participate in the opening of a new "Porąbka" coal mine, and Jaros likely began preparations for the assassination in fall of 1961, two months before the visit.

The would-be assassin appeared on the chosen location in the morning of December 3, but, like in 1959, he saw there were too many people along Krakowska Street, so he decided to postpone the explosion until the delegation came back from the opening of the mine. After waiting for a few hours, he saw a few vehicles, and concluded it was Gomułka's motorcade. Jaros detonated the bomb, not knowing that Gomułka was still at the coal mine.

"At about 12:06 pm, a motorcade consisting, among others, of three limousines, entered Krakowska Street. When all cars passed a house number 47, a bomb exploded, hidden in a kilometer post. Two people were injured – a girl, who was walking past, and a miner, who was returning from celebrations. Shrapnels also destroyed one of the limousines, but not the one with Gomulka" – wrote Adam Dziuba, historian of Katowice office of the Institute of National Remembrance. The girl was partially paralysed, and the miner later died in hospital.

== Investigation ==
Franciszek Szlachcic, who was chief of security services office in Katowice, almost lost his job for failure to provide adequate security. Szlachcic and Edward Gierek were suspects for a while as Władysław Gomułka believed they wanted kill him to take his post.

Detectives, examining the bomb, established the person who constructed it was knowledgeable in electromechanics, had access to explosives, and was a local resident. A list of suspects was created, and the investigation was codenamed Antena. Special operational groups of secret service agents investigated suspects, resulting in the creation of a new list of 71 names, including Jaros. On December 20, their houses were searched. During a search at Jaros' house, tools and explosives were found, which as was later established, fitted with traces left on the bomb's cord. Jaros was arrested and placed in a jail in Będzin. He was transferred to Central Prison in Katowice, where his cell was bugged. Służba Bezpieczeństwa placed a secret service agent, posing as an inmate, in the cell, tasked with cajoling Jaros into talking. On January 7, 1962, during a conversation with the agent, Jaros admitted to constructing a bomb, which exploded on December 3. He added that the attempt was politically motivated and he had been handling explosives for a long time. Jaros said that in the late 1950s, he read a book titled "Last assassination attempt of Adolf Hitler", which gave him inspiration to organize an attempt to kill both Polish and Soviet leaders.

== Trial and execution ==
Both the investigation and trial, which took place in Provincial Court in Katowice, were classified. The trial was relatively short, lasting from May 9 to May 25, 1962. For an attempt to kill top Polish and Soviet officials, Stanisław Jaros was sentenced to death and hanged on January 5, 1963. No news of either attempt leaked to the West, and the Polish public was not informed of either attempt.

== See also ==
- Eligiusz Niewiadomski
