= Chief Commission for the Prosecution of Crimes against the Polish Nation =

Polish government agency

The Chief Commission for the Prosecution of Crimes against the Polish Nation (Polish: Główna Komisja Ścigania Zbrodni przeciwko Narodowi Polskiemu) is a governmental agency created in 1945 in Poland. It is tasked with investigating Nazi crimes against the Polish nation and since 1991 also of Communist crimes. In 1999, it was transformed into the main organizational unit of the investigative department of the Institute of National Remembrance (IPN).

== Naming ==
The commission was created in the aftermath of World War II under leadership of the Polish Communist and Auschwitz survivor Alfred Fiderkiewicz to investigate Nazi crimes against the Polish nation. Following the Fall of Communism in Poland and revision of its mission in 1991, it was also tasked with investigate Communist crimes in Poland. Although the IPN in its contemporary form has been established in 1999 with the commission included as its integral part, the latter predated it by over a half century as a standalone body established in 1945 and has been considered the earliest ancestral form of the IPN. The commission has since its inception undergone a number of name changes. There are also differences in unofficial translations of the commission name in various sources, with Main used instead of Chief, Research(ing), or Examination instead of Investigation, Nazi instead of Hitlerite, and Atrocities instead of Crimes, one example being the name Main Commission for Researching Crimes against the Polish nation.

From 1945 to 1949, it was known as the Chief Commission for Investigation of German Crimes in Poland (Główna Komisja Badania Zbrodni Niemieckich w Polsce). The formation in 1949 of the German Democratic Republic as an official ally of Poland within the Eastern Bloc created the need to limit somehow the postwar rampant anti-German sentiment among Poles, e.g. through replacing the object of hate, namely Germans, with the more abstract Hitlerites, therefore the body became known until 1984 as the Chief Commission for Investigation of Hitlerite [instead of German] Crimes in Poland (Główna Komisja Badania Zbrodni Hitlerowskich w Polsce) In 1984, the latter name was expanded to include for the first time also the designation of the IPN, initially as an honorary suffix title only, resulting in the body being named the Chief Commission for Investigation of Hitlerite Crimes in Poland – Institute of National Remembrance (Główna Komisja Badania Zbrodni Hitlerowskich w Polsce – Instytut Pamięci Narodowej) until 1991. The end of Communism in Poland paved the way for investigating also the crimes perpetrated by the Soviets along with the Polish puppet government installed by them, necessitating in 1991 a fresh rename of the body into the Chief Commission for Investigation of Crimes against the Polish Nation – Institute of National Remembrance (Główna Komisja Badania Zbrodni przeciwko Narodowi Polskiemu – Instytut Pamięci Narodowej), which continued under this name until 1999. Subsequently, the commission served as the cornerstone for the nascent ambitious project of forming the IPN envisaged as combining much broader scope of tasks; the commission itself had its powers, previously restricted to conducting investigations, extended also to prosecuting crimes, resulting in its ultimate rename into the contemporary Chief Commission for the Prosecution of Crimes against the Polish Nation.

== Activities ==
Upon its creation, it was tasked to investigate crimes committed by Nazi Germany in the years 1939–1945 on Polish territories in general and on Polish citizens in other territories occupied by Nazi Germany and in Germany itself; collect and archive materials about said crimes; and analyze said materials and publish analysis on this topic. This last aspect of its mission has been described as educational. Polish criminal code also stated that investigations of the commission have equal status to court proceedings.

The commission has been instrumental in providing evidence for the war criminal trials carried out in Poland by the Supreme National Tribunal (1945–1948), including for the trials of Albert Forster, Rudolf Höss, and Amon Göth. By 1950, the commission had succeeded in getting approximately 2,000 German war criminals extradited to Poland. Its materials were used in later trials of Ludwig Hahn, Erich Koch, and Wilhelm Rosenbaum, among others. In 1968, its experts and materials were used to aid the United Nations in drafting of the Convention on the Non-Applicability of Statutory Limitations to War Crimes and Crimes Against Humanity. It has also fathered the most comprehensive collection of materials about World War II atrocities in Poland in existence. By 1989 nearly 20,000 Germans were sentenced in Poland for war crimes.

Starting in 1946, the commission has published an academic journal describing its activities and findings. The journal has changed its name several times; since 1995, it is published as Pamięć i Sprawiedliwość ("Memory and Justice").

== See also ==
- Central Office of the State Justice Administrations for the Investigation of National Socialist Crimes
