= Zofia Gomułkowa =

Polish Communist functionary

- Born: Liwa Szoken; 12 May 1902; Warsaw
- Died: 27 November 1986 (aged 84); Warsaw, Polish People's Republic
- Other names: Liwa Szoken, Zofia Gomułka
- Citizenship: Polish
- Occupation: Communist functionary
- Known for: Wife of First Secretary of the Polish United Workers' Party, Władysław Gomułka

Personal details
- Spouse: Władysław Gomułka
- Ethnicity: Jewish
- Belief system: Atheist
- Children: 3

Zofia Gomułkowa, or Zofia Gomułka (born Liwa Szoken; 12 May 1902 – 27 November 1986), was a wife of First Secretary of the Polish United Workers' Party, Władysław Gomułka, leader of communist Poland from 21 October 1956 until 20 December 1970. Zofia was a pro-Soviet activist since the age of 18, as well as an executive member of the delegalized Communist Party of Poland (KPP) in the interwar period. After the Soviet takeover of Poland at the end of World War II, she initially worked as her husband's secretary and later, as a communist functionary in the Warsaw headquarters of PZPR.

== Life ==
Liwa Szoken was born in 1902 in Warsaw, to an impoverished family of Orthodox Jews. She left her home at the age of 16, and in 1920 joined the Communist Party of Poland delegalized in 1919. She worked at a match factory Płomyk in the Warsaw neighbourhood of Pelcowizna (pl), part of Praga-Północ. She met Władysław Gomułka (a Catholic by birth, and an ironworker) at the age of 25 in 1927. A year earlier, he joined the Communist Party of Poland sponsored financially by the Communist International and served as leader of the Trade Union of Chemical Industry Workers at the time. They started living together in a common-law relationship. Liwa broke all contact with her Jewish family. The next year, Władysław Gomułka, age 23, was transferred to Zawiercie. Gomułkowa gave birth to a son there, who died within days. They relocated back to Warsaw and did not return to Zawiercie ever again.

In 1930 Zofia Gomułkowa gave birth to her son Ryszard. She did not get married because, in prewar Poland, marriage was a religious ceremony. Her common-law husband was arrested in 1932 for communist agitation during a workers' protest in Łódź. Upon his release, Władysław Gomułka left Poland for Moscow to study ideology at the Lenin's Academy. She could not afford to keep her son and gave him to Gomułka's family in the village of Białobrzegi near Krosno. Ryszard Gomułka-Strzelecki grew up without knowing about his Jewish roots. His daughter Ewa learned about her grandmother's Jewish background only as an adult.

Zofia Gomułkowa married Władysław Gomułka in Stalinist Poland on 21 April 1951 in a civil ceremony without a wedding. At about that time, she changed her given name officially from Liwa to Zofia. Years later, she has supported her husband's anti-Zionist campaign of March 1968. Their son remarked that in the opinion of his father, those who like other places better and don't identify with Poland should leave. Notably, Zofia voiced no objections either to the massacre of the striking shipyard workers in 1970, an event that ultimately led to her husband's fall from power.
