= Alfred Fiderkiewicz =

Polish journalist (1886–1972)

Alfred Jan Fiderkiewicz
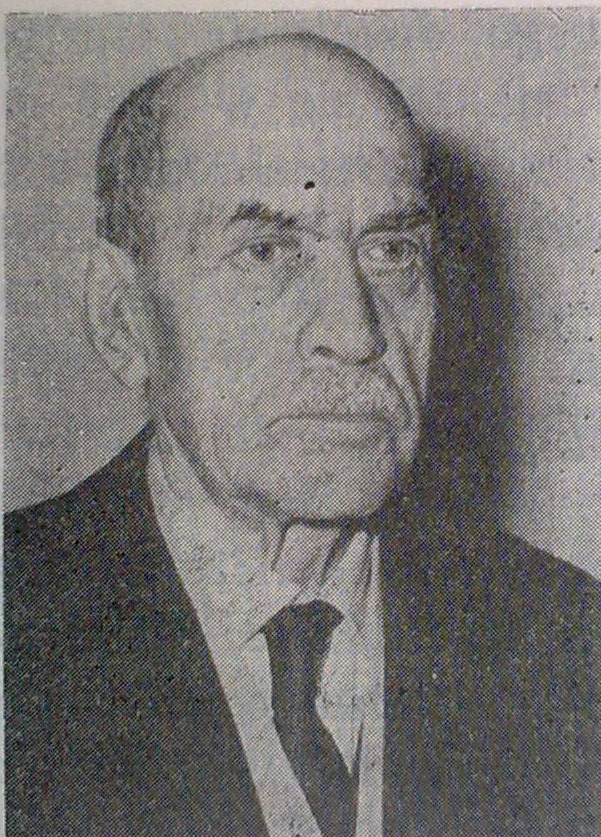
- Alfred Fiderkiewicz (1973)

Mayor of Kraków
- In office 5 February 1945 – 14 June 1945
- Preceded by: Stanisław Klimecki
- Succeeded by: Zdzisław Balicki

Personal details
- Born: 2 August 1886 Horodenka, Kingdom of Galicia and Lodomeria, Austria-Hungary
- Died: 8 June 1972 (aged 85) Poland
- Resting place: Powązki Military Cemetery, Warsaw, Poland
- Party: Polish People's Party "Wyzwolenie", Communist Party of Poland, Polish Workers' Party, Polish United Workers' Party
- Education: Boston University
- Occupation: Politician, physician, diplomat
- Known for: Labor movement activism, Auschwitz survivor

Alfred Jan Fiderkiewicz (2 August 1886 – 8 June 1972) was a Polish activist of the labor movement, socialist politician, physician, diplomat and Auschwitz survivor.

== Biography ==
Fiderkiewicz was born in to a peasant family. His family moved to the United States where he worked as a laborer. Fiderkiewicz studied at the Boston University and was also active in the trade union movement. He returned to Poland in 1922 where he was then elected as deputy to the Sejm for the Kalisz district representing the Polish People's Party "Wyzwolenie". In 1924, he was a founding member of the Independent Peasants' Party, and served as the chairman of its Main Board in the years 1924–1927. At the same time, from 1925 he was active in the Communist Party of Poland. In 1926, he was a candidate of the KKP and the Independent Peasants Party for the president of the Republic of Poland.

In 1927, he was imprisoned in Pawiak for several months. In 1928, he was arrested by the police for a short period and left for Gdańsk, and then for two months to the USSR. After returning to Poland, he practiced as a doctor in Milanówek (until 1943). His house was a place of contacts and illegal meetings of KPP members. In the late 1930s, he was delegated to be active in the democratic movement, he was a member of the Democratic Club in Warsaw, he was also a member of the authorities of the Democratic Party.

After the invasion of Nazi Germany and the USSR and with the occupation of the Poland, communists continued to meet in his apartment. On September 14, 1940, he was arrested by the Gestapo and released after two months thanks to a high ransom. In mid-1941, he founded the "Proletariusz" organization in Warsaw, and in January 1942 joined the Polish Workers' Party. He worked closely with Marceli Nowotko, Paweł Finder and other leading PPR activists. He organized meetings of representatives of the Polish Workers' Party and the Government Delegation in February and March 1943. Meetings of the leadership of the Polish Workers' Party often took place in his house in Milanówek. On 28 June 1943, he was arrested again, and from August 1943 to January 1945 imprisoned in a German camp concentration camp in Auschwitz-Birkenau.

After the end of the war, he was the mayor of Kraków for a short period (from February 5 to June 14, 1945). From May 3, 1945, he was a member of the State National Council, representing the Polish Workers' Party. From 1945 to 1949 he worked in diplomacy as chargé d'affaires in London, envoy in Montreal and Budapest. In 1948 he joined the newly established Polish United Workers' Party and chaired the Trade Union of Health Care Workers on its behalf. He was also the director of the Main Chief Commission for the Prosecution of Crimes against the Polish Nation.

During the final years of his life he wrote multiple book and articles, which were mostly memoirs. Fiderkiewicz was buried on June 10, 1972, in the Alley of Merit at the Powązki Military Cemetery. He received a state funeral with thousands of participants.

== Awards ==
- Order of Builders of People's Poland
- Order of the Banner of Labour, 1st class
- Commander's Cross of the Order of Polonia Restituta
- Officer's Cross of the Order of Polonia Restituta
- Medal of the 10th Anniversary of People's Poland
