= Władysław Gomułka =

Leader of Poland (1956–1970)

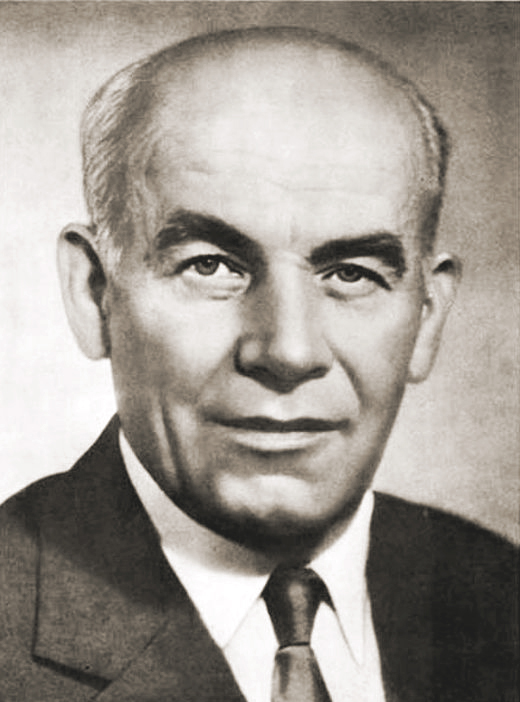
- Gomułka in 1960

First Secretary of the Polish United Workers' Party
- In office 21 October 1956 – 20 December 1970
- Prime Minister: Józef Cyrankiewicz
- Chairman: Aleksander Zawadzki; Edward Ochab; Marian Spychalski
- Preceded by: Edward Ochab
- Succeeded by: Edward Gierek

First Secretary of the Polish Workers' Party
- In office 23 November 1943 – 3 September 1948
- Preceded by: Paweł Finder
- Succeeded by: Bolesław Bierut

Personal details
- Born: 6 February 1905 Krosno, Kingdom of Galicia and Lodomeria, Austria-Hungary (now Poland)
- Died: 1 September 1982 (aged 77) Konstancin, Polish People's Republic
- Resting place: Powązki Military Cemetery
- Party: Independent Peasant Party (1925–1926); Communist Party of Poland (1926–1938); Polish Workers' Party (1942–1948); Polish United Workers' Party (1948–1951, 1956–1982); Independent (1951–1956)
- Spouse: Liwa Szoken (1902–1986)
- De facto leader of the PPR: ← Ochab; Gierek →

Władysław Gomułka (Polish: [vwaˈdɨswav ɡɔˈmuwka]; 6 February 1905 – 1 September 1982) was a Polish communist politician. He was the de facto leader of the Polish People's Republic from 1956 to 1970.

Gomułka was born in 1905 in Galicia. A plumber from the age of fourteen, he joined the revolutionary movement, made propaganda in the trade unions and suffered the rigours of the Witos government, then of the Pilsudski dictatorship. During the textile strike at Łódź in 1932, he was seriously wounded in the leg by the police, which ultimately left him with permanent walking impairment. Held as a political prisoner for several years, he was released during the invasion of Poland in 1939 and took refuge in Lwów.

He was ordered to Warsaw and became one of the most energetic organisers of the resistance against the Nazis. In 1943, he became the leader of the left-wing resistance fighters, the general secretary of the underground Polish Workers' Party (PPR). When Poland was occupied by the Red Army, it collaborated with the Lublin government, formed by the Soviets with the Polish Bierut group, which received Stalin's blessing.

Following the Polish October, he became leader again from 1956 to 1970. Gomułka was initially very popular for his reforms; his seeking a "Polish way to socialism"; and giving rise to the period known as "Polish thaw". He put an end to the forced collectivization of land, eased relations with the Catholic Church, and secured the departure of Soviet advisers. During the 1960s, however, he became more rigid and authoritarian — afraid of destabilising the system, he was not inclined to introduce or permit changes. In 1967 to 1968, Gomułka allowed outbursts of anti-Zionist and antisemitic political campaign. Many of the remaining Polish Jews left the country. At that time, he was also responsible for persecuting protesting students and toughening censorship of the media. Gomułka supported Poland's participation in the Warsaw Pact invasion of Czechoslovakia in August 1968.

In the treaty with West Germany, signed in December 1970 at the end of Gomułka's period in office, West Germany recognised the post-World War II borders, which established a foundation for future peace, stability and cooperation in Central Europe. In the same month, economic difficulties led to price rises and subsequent bloody clashes with shipyard workers on the Baltic coast, in which several dozen workers were fatally shot. The tragic events forced Gomułka's resignation and retirement. In a generational replacement of the ruling elite, Edward Gierek took over the Party leadership, and tensions eased.

== Childhood and education ==
Władysław Gomułka was born on 6 February 1905 in Białobrzegi Franciszkańskie village on the outskirts of Krosno, into a worker's family living in the Austrian Partition (the Galicia region) (now Poland). His parents had met and married in the United States, where each had immigrated to in search of work in the late 19th century, but returned to occupied Poland in the early 20th century because Władysław's father, Jan, was unable to find gainful employment in America. Jan Gomułka then worked as a laborer in the Subcarpathian oil industry. Władysław's older sister Józefa, born in the United States, returned there upon turning eighteen to join her extended family, most of whom had emigrated, and to preserve her citizenship of the United States. Władysław and his two other siblings experienced a childhood of the proverbial Galician poverty: they lived in a dilapidated hut and ate mostly potatoes. Władysław received only a rudimentary education before being employed in the oil industry of the region.

Gomułka attended schools in Krosno for six or seven years, until the age of thirteen, when he had to start an apprenticeship in a metalworks shop. Throughout his life, Gomułka was an avid reader and accomplished a great deal of self-education, but remained a subject of jokes because of his lack of formal education and demeanor. In 1922, Gomułka passed his apprenticeship exams and began working at a local refinery.

== Early revolutionary activities ==
=== Involvement with labor unions and first imprisonment ===
The re-established Polish state of Gomułka's teenage years was a scene of growing political polarization and radicalization. The young worker developed connections with the radical Left, joining the Siła (Power) youth organisation in 1922 and the Independent Peasant Party in 1925. Gomułka was known for his activism among the metal workers and, from 1922, the chemical industry unions. He was involved in union-organised strikes and in 1924, during a protest gathering in Krosno, participated in a polemical debate with Herman Lieberman. He published radical texts in leftist newspapers. In May 1926, the young Gomułka was arrested for the first time but soon released because of worker demands. The incident was the subject of a parliamentary intervention by the Peasant Party. In October 1926, Gomułka became a secretary of the managing council in the Chemical Industry Workers Union for the Drohobych District and remained involved with that communist-dominated union until 1930. He around this time learned on his own basic Ukrainian.

In late 1926, while in Drohobych, Gomułka became a member of the illegal-but-functioning Communist Party of Poland (Komunistyczna Partia Polski, KPP) and was arrested for political agitation. Technically, at this time, he was a member of the Communist Party of Western Ukraine, which was an autonomous branch of the Communist Party of Poland. He was interested primarily in social issues, including the trade and labor movement, and concentrated on practical activities. In mid-1927, Gomułka was brought to Warsaw, where he remained active until drafted for military service at the end of the year. After several months, the military released him because of a health problem with his right leg. Gomułka returned to communist party work, organising strike actions and speaking at gatherings of workers at all major industrial centers of Poland. During this period, he was arrested several times and lived under police supervision.

Gomułka was an activist in the leftist labor unions from 1926 and in the Central Trade Department of the KPP Central Committee from 1931. In the summer of 1930, Gomułka illegally embarked on his first foreign trip with the intention of participating in the Red International of Labor Unions Fifth Congress held in Moscow from 15 to 30 July. Traveling from Upper Silesia to Berlin, he had to wait there for the issuance of Soviet documents and arrived in Moscow too late to participate in the deliberations of the Congress. He stayed in Moscow for a couple of weeks and then went to Leningrad, from where he took a ship to Hamburg, stayed in Berlin again and through Silesia returned to Poland.

In August 1932, he was arrested by the Sanation police while participating in a conference of textile worker delegates in Łódź. When he later tried to escape, Gomułka sustained a gunshot wound in the left thigh, which ultimately left him with permanent walking impairment.

=== Journey to the Soviet Union and second imprisonment ===
Despite being sentenced to a four-year prison term on 1 June 1933, he was temporarily released for surgery on his injured leg in March 1934. Following his release, Gomułka requested that the KPP send him to the Soviet Union for medical treatment and further political training. He arrived in the Soviet Union in June and went to the Crimea for several weeks, where he underwent therapeutic baths. Gomułka then spent more than a year in Moscow, where he attended the Lenin School under the name Stefan Kowalski. The ideology-oriented classes were arranged separately for a small group of Polish students (one of them was Roman Romkowski (Natan Grünspan [Grinszpan]-Kikiel), who would later persecute Gomułka in Stalinist Poland) and included a military training course conducted by Karol Świerczewski. In a written opinion issued by the school, Gomułka was characterised in highly positive terms, but his extended stay in the Soviet Union caused him to become disillusioned with the realities of Stalinist communism and highly critical of the agrarian collectivisation practice. In November 1935, he illegally returned to Poland.

Gomułka resumed his communist and labor conspiratorial activities and kept advancing within the KPP organization until, as the secretary of the Party's Silesian branch, he was arrested in Chorzów in April 1936. He was then tried by the District Court in Katowice and sentenced to seven years in prison, where he remained jailed until the beginning of World War II. Ironically, this internment most likely saved Gomułka's life, because the majority of the KPP leadership would be murdered in the Soviet Union in the late 1930s, caught up in the Great Purge under Joseph Stalin's orders.

Gomułka's experiences turned him into an extremely suspicious and distrustful person and contributed to his lifelong conviction that Sanation Poland was a fascist state, even if Polish prisons were the safest place for Polish Communists. He differentiated this belief from his positive feelings toward the country and its people, especially members of the working class.

== World War II ==
=== Invasion of Poland ===
The outbreak of the war with Nazi Germany freed Gomułka from his prison confinement. On 7 September 1939, he arrived in Warsaw, where he stayed for a few weeks, working in the besieged capital on the construction of defensive fortifications. From there, like many other Polish communists, Gomułka fled to eastern Poland, which was invaded by the Soviet Union on 17 September 1939. In Białystok, he ran a home for former political prisoners arriving from other parts of Poland. To be reunited with his luckily found wife, at the end of 1939, Gomułka moved to Soviet-controlled Lwów.

Like other members of the dissolved Communist Party of Poland, Gomułka sought membership in the Soviet All-Union Communist Party (Bolsheviks). The Soviet authorities allowed such membership transfers only from March 1941 and in April of that year, Gomułka received his party card in Kiev.

The circumstances of the Polish communists' lives changed dramatically after 1941 German attack on the Soviet positions in eastern Poland. Reduced to penury in now German-occupied Lwów, the Gomułkas managed to join Władysław's family in Krosno by the end of 1941. However, a momentous development soon took place in the sphere of communist political activity: in January 1942, Joseph Stalin reestablished in Warsaw a Polish communist party under the name of the Polish Workers' Party (PPR).

In 1942, Gomułka participated in the reformation of a Polish communist party (the KPP was destroyed in Stalin's purges in the late 1930s) under the name Polish Workers' Party (Polska Partia Robotnicza, PPR). Gomułka became involved in the creation of party structures in the Subcarpathian region and began using his wartime conspiratorial pseudonym "Wiesław". In July 1942, Paweł Finder brought Gomułka to occupied Warsaw. In August, the secretary of the PPR's regional Warsaw Committee was arrested by the Gestapo and "Wiesław" was entrusted with his job. In September, Gomułka became a member of the PPR's Temporary Central Committee.

In late 1942 and early 1943, the PPR experienced a severe crisis because of the murder of its first secretary Marceli Nowotko. Gomułka participated in the party investigation directed against another member of the leadership, Bolesław Mołojec, that resulted in Mołojec's execution. Together with Paweł Finder, who was made First Secretary of the party, and Franciszek Jóźwiak, Gomułka (under the pseudonym "Wiesław") was included in the Party's new inner leadership, established in January 1943. The Central Committee was enlarged in the following months to include Bolesław Bierut, among others.

In February 1943, Gomułka led the communist side in a series of important meetings in Warsaw between the PPR and the Government Delegation of the London-based Polish government-in-exile and the Home Army. The talks produced no results because of the divergent interests of the parties involved and a mutual lack of confidence. The Delegation officially discontinued the negotiations on 28 April, three days after the Soviet government broke diplomatic relations with the Polish government. He became the Party's main ideologist. He wrote the "What do we fight for?" (O co walczymy?) publication dated 1 March 1943, and the much more comprehensive declaration that emerged under the same title in November. "Wiesław" supervised the Party's main editorial and publishing undertaking.

Gomułka made efforts, largely unsuccessful, to secure the PPR's cooperation with other political forces in occupied Poland. Bierut, meanwhile, was indifferent to any such attempts and counted simply on compulsion provided by a future presence of the Red Army in Poland. The different strategies resulted in a sharp conflict between the two communist politicians.

=== State National Council, Polish Committee of National Liberation ===
In the fall of 1943, the PPR leadership began discussing the creation of a Polish quasi-parliamentary, communist-led body, to be named the State National Council (Krajowa Rada Narodowa, KRN). After the Battle of Kursk, the expectation was of a Soviet victory and liberation of Poland and the PPR wanted to be ready to assume power. Gomułka came up with the idea of a national council and imposed his point of view on the rest of the leadership. The PPR intended to obtain consent from the Comintern leader and their Soviet contact Georgi Dimitrov. However, in November, the Gestapo arrested Finder and Małgorzata Fornalska, who possessed the secret codes for communication with Moscow and the Soviet response remained unknown. In the absence of Finder, on 23 November, Gomułka was elected general secretary (chief) of the PPR and Bierut joined the three-person inner leadership.

The founding meeting of the State National Council took place in the late evening of 31 December 1943. The new body's chairman, Bierut, was becoming Gomułka's main rival. In mid-January 1944, Dimitrov was finally informed of the KRN's existence, which surprised both him and the Polish communist leaders in Moscow, increasingly led by Jakub Berman, who had other, competing ideas concerning the establishment of a Polish communist ruling party and government.

Gomułka felt that the Polish communists in occupied Poland had a better understanding of Polish realities than their brethren in Moscow and that the State National Council should determine the shape of the future executive government of Poland. Nevertheless, to gain Soviet approval and to clear any misunderstandings, a KRN delegation left Warsaw in mid-March heading for Moscow, where it arrived two months later. By that time, Stalin concluded that the existence of the KRN was a positive development and the Poles arriving from Warsaw were received and greeted by him and other Soviet dignitaries. The Union of Polish Patriots and the Central Bureau of Polish Communists in Moscow were now under pressure to recognise the primacy of the PPR, the KRN and Władysław Gomułka, which they ultimately did only in mid-July.

On 20 July 1944, the Soviet forces under Marshal Konstantin Rokossovsky forced their way across the Bug River and on that same day the combined meeting of Polish communists from the Moscow and Warsaw factions finalised the arrangements regarding the establishment (on 21 July) of the Polish Committee of National Liberation (PKWN), a temporary government headed by Edward Osóbka-Morawski, a socialist allied with the communists. Gomułka and other PPR leaders left Warsaw and headed for the Soviet-controlled territory, arriving in Lublin on 1 August, the day the Warsaw Uprising erupted in the Polish capital.

== Post-war political career ==
=== Role in communist takeover of Poland ===
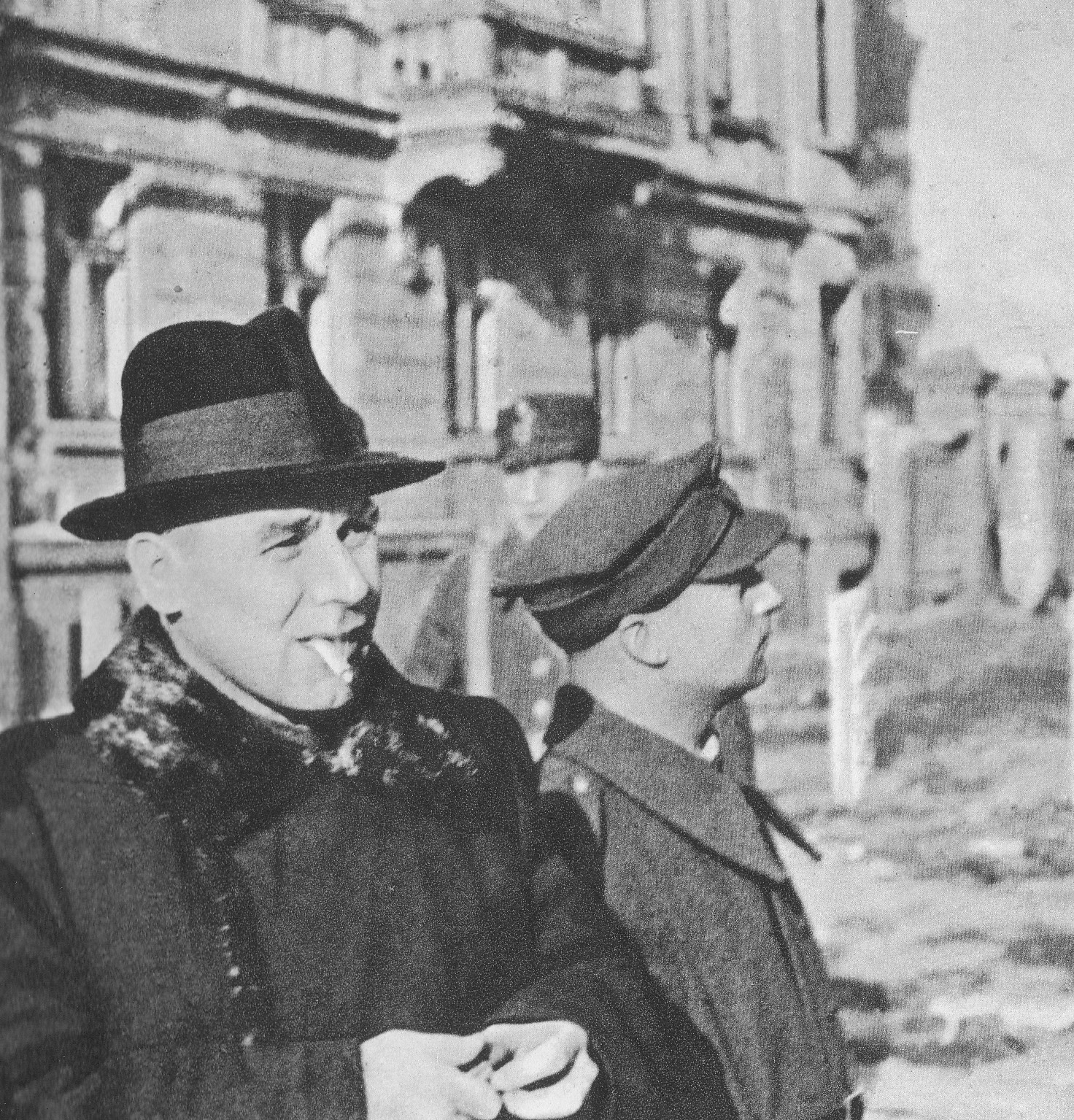
Gomułka in recaptured Warsaw, 1945

Gomułka was a deputy prime minister in the Provisional Government of the Republic of Poland (Rząd Tymczasowy Rzeczypospolitej Polskiej), from January to June 1945, and in the Provisional Government of National Unity (Tymczasowy Rząd Jedności Narodowej), from 1945 to 1947. As a minister of Recovered Territories (1945–1948), he exerted great influence over the rebuilding, integration and economic progress of Poland within its new borders, by supervising the settlement, development and administration of the lands acquired from Germany. Using his position in the PPR and government, Gomułka led the leftist social transformations in Poland and participated in the crushing of the resistance to communist rule during the post-war years. He also helped the communists in winning the Trzy razy tak ("Three Times Yes") referendum of 1946. A year later, he played a key role in the 1947 parliamentary elections, which were fraudulently arranged to give the communists and their allies an overwhelming victory. After the elections, all remaining legal opposition in Poland was effectively destroyed, and Gomułka was now the most powerful man in Poland. In June 1948, because of the impending unification of the PPR and PPS, Gomułka delivered a talk on the subject of the history of the Polish worker movement.

In a memo written to Stalin in 1948, Gomułka argued that "some of the Jewish comrades don't feel any link to the Polish nation or to the Polish working class [...] or they maintain a stance which might be described as "national nihilism"". As a result, he considered it "absolutely necessary not only to stop any further growth in the percentage of Jews in the state as well as the party apparatus, but also to slowly lower that percentage, especially at the highest levels of the apparatus". Nikita Khrushchev, who was intimately involved in Polish affairs in the 1940s, according to Khrushchev's memoirs, believed that Gomułka had a valid point in opposing the personnel policies pursued by Roman Zambrowski, Jakub Berman, and Hilary Minc, all of them of Jewish descent and brought to Poland from the Soviet Union. Nevertheless, Khrushchev attributed Gomułka's subsequent downfall to his rivals having succeeded in portraying Gomułka as being pro-Yugoslav; the charges were not made public but were brought to Stalin's attention and became crucial in his decision-making on whose side he would support — in view of the Soviet–Yugoslavia rift that occurred in 1948.

=== Temporary withdrawal from politics ===
In the late 1940s, Poland's communist government was split by a rivalry between Gomułka and President Bolesław Bierut. Gomułka led a home national group while Bierut headed a group raised by Stalin in the Soviet Union. The struggle ultimately led to Gomułka's removal from power in 1948. While Bierut advocated a policy of complete subservience to Moscow, Gomułka wanted to adapt the Communist blueprint to Polish circumstances. Among other things, he opposed forced collectivisation and was skeptical of the Cominform. The Bierut faction had Stalin's ear, and on Stalin's orders, Gomułka was sacked as party leader for "rightist-nationalist deviation," replaced by Bierut. In December, soon after the PPR and Polish Socialist Party merged to form Polish United Workers' Party (PZPR) (which was essentially the PPR under a new name), Gomułka was dropped from the merged party's Politburo. He was stripped of his remaining government posts in January 1949 and expelled from the party altogether in November. For the next eight years, he performed no official functions and was subjected to persecution, including almost four years of imprisonment from 1951 to 1954.

Bierut died in March 1956, during a period of de-Stalinisation in Poland, which gradually developed after Stalin's death. Edward Ochab became the new first secretary of the Party. Soon afterward, Gomułka was partially rehabilitated when Ochab conceded that Gomułka should not have been jailed, while reiterating the charges of "rightist-nationalist deviation" against him.

=== Rise to power ===
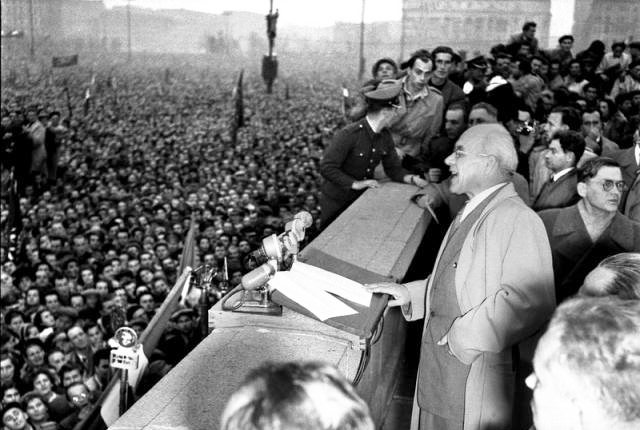
Gomułka's speech on 24 October 1956 in Warsaw

In June 1956, violent worker protests broke out in Poznań. The worker riots were harshly suppressed and dozens of workers were killed. However, the Party leadership, which now included many reform-minded officials, recognised to some degree the validity of the protest participants' demands and took steps to placate the workers.

The reformers in the Party wanted a political rehabilitation of Gomułka and his return to the Party leadership. Gomułka insisted that he be given real power to implement further reforms. He wanted a replacement of some of the Party leaders, including the pro-Soviet Minister of Defense Konstantin Rokossovsky.

The Soviet leadership viewed events in Poland with alarm. Simultaneously with Soviet troop movements deep into Poland, a high-level Soviet delegation flew to Warsaw. It was led by Nikita Khrushchev and included Anastas Mikoyan, Nikolai Bulganin, Vyacheslav Molotov, Lazar Kaganovich, Ivan Konev and others. Ochab and Gomułka made it clear that Polish forces would resist if Soviet troops advanced, but reassured the Soviets that the reforms were internal matters and that Poland had no intention of abandoning the communist bloc or its treaties with the Soviet Union. The Soviets yielded.

Following the wishes of the majority of the Politburo members, First Secretary Ochab conceded and on 20 October the Central Committee brought Gomułka and several associates into the Politburo, removed others, and elected Gomułka as the first secretary of the Party. Gomułka, the former prisoner of the Stalinists, enjoyed wide popular support across the country, expressed by the participants of a massive street demonstration in Warsaw on 24 October. Seeing that Gomułka was popular with the Polish people, and given his insistence that he wanted to maintain the alliance with the Soviet Union and the presence of the Red Army in Poland, Khrushchev decided that Gomułka was a leader that Moscow could live with.

== Leadership of the Polish People's Republic ==
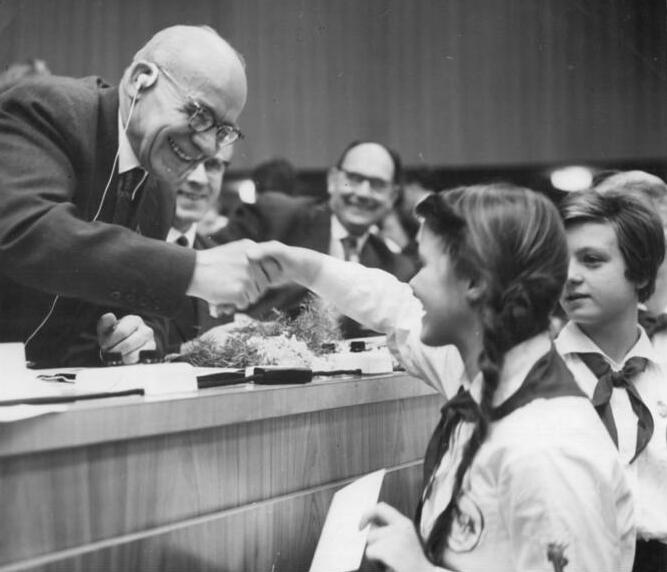
Gomułka (left) greeted by members of the Ernst Thälmann Pioneer Organisation in East Germany.

=== Relations with other Eastern Bloc countries ===
A major factor that influenced Gomułka was the Oder-Neisse line issue. West Germany refused to recognise the Oder-Neisse line and Gomułka realised the fundamental instability of Poland's unilaterally imposed western border. He felt threatened by the revanchist statements put out by the Adenauer government and believed that the alliance with the Soviet Union was the only thing stopping the threat of a future German invasion. The new Party leader told the 8th Plenum of the PZPR on 19 October 1956 that: "Poland needs friendship with the Soviet Union more than the Soviet Union needs friendship with Poland [...] Without the Soviet Union we cannot maintain our borders with the West". The treaty with West Germany was negotiated and signed in December 1970. The German side recognised the post-World War II borders, which established a foundation for future peace, stability and cooperation in Central Europe.

During the events of the Prague Spring, Gomułka was one of the key leaders of the Warsaw Pact and supported Poland's participation in the invasion of Czechoslovakia in August 1968.

=== Assassination attempts ===
Gomułka was the target of several assassination plots. The attempts were carried out by dissident Stanisław Jaros, who also targeted Nikita Khrushchev on 15 July 1959 while he was on a state visit to Poland. A final attempt was carried out in 1961, which led to Jaros's arrest and execution.

=== Domestic policies ===
In 1967–1968, Gomułka allowed outbursts of "anti-Zionist" political propaganda, which developed initially as a result of the Soviet bloc's frustration with the outcome of the Arab-Israeli Six-Day War. It turned out to be a thinly veiled antisemitic campaign and purge of the army, pursued primarily by others in the Party, but utilised by Gomułka to keep himself in power by shifting the attention of the populace from the stagnating economy and mismanagement. The result was the emigration of the majority of the remaining Polish citizens of Jewish origin. At that time, he was also responsible for persecuting protesting students and toughening censorship of the media.

=== Resignation and retirement ===
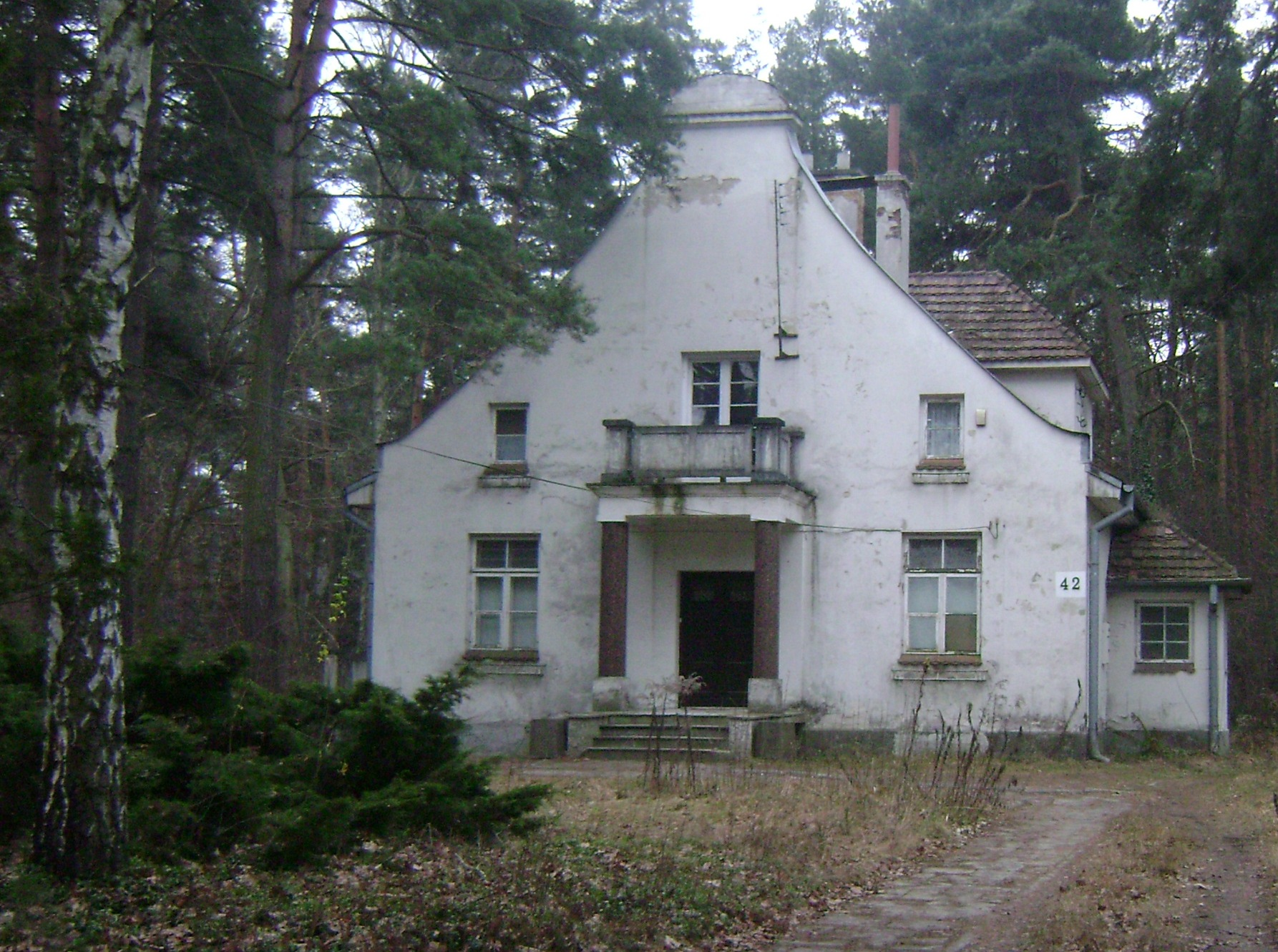
Gomułka's now abandoned retirement home in Konstancin-Jeziorna

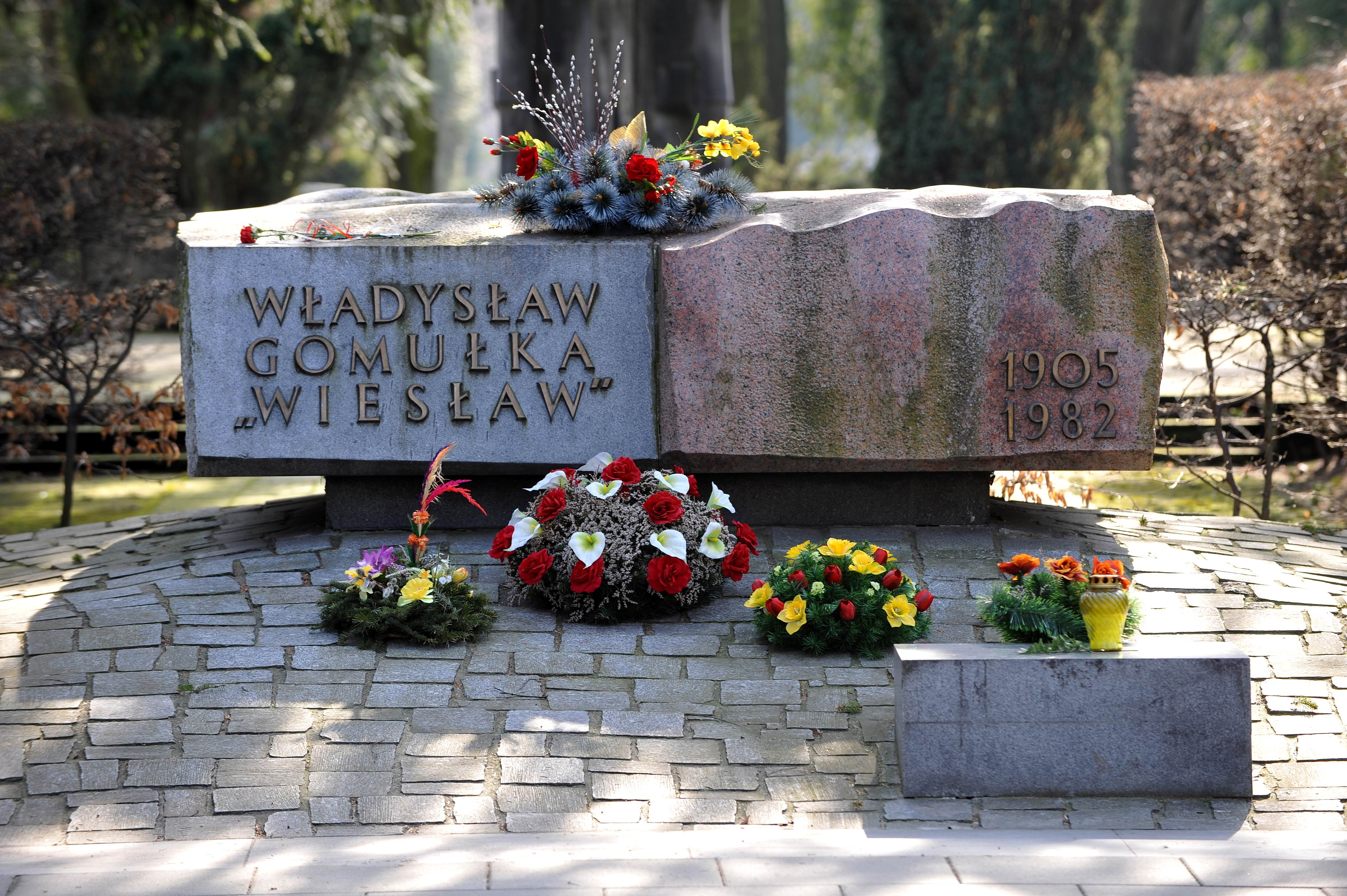
Gomułka's grave in Powązki Military Cemetery

In December 1970, economic difficulties led to price rises and subsequent protests. Gomułka along with his right-hand man Zenon Kliszko ordered the regular Army under General Bolesław Chocha, to shoot striking workers with automatic weapons in Gdańsk and Gdynia. Over 41 shipyard workers of the Baltic coast were killed in the ensuing police-state violence, while well over a thousand people were wounded. The events forced Gomułka's resignation and retirement. In a generational replacement of the ruling elite, Edward Gierek took over the Party leadership and tensions eased.

Gomułka's negative image in communist propaganda after his removal was gradually modified and some of his constructive contributions were recognised. He is seen as an honest and austere believer in the socialist system, who, unable to resolve Poland's formidable difficulties and satisfy mutually contradictory demands, grew more rigid and despotic later in his career. A heavy smoker, he died in 1982 at the age of 77 of lung cancer. Gomułka's memoirs were not published until 1994, long after his death, and five years after the collapse of the communist regime which he served and led.

The American journalist John Gunther described Gomułka in 1961 as being "professorial in manner, aloof, and angular, with a peculiar spry pepperiness".

Gomułka was buried at Powązki Military Cemetery in Warsaw.

== Decorations and awards ==
- Polish People's Republic:
  - Order of the Builders of People's Poland
  - Grand Cross of the Order of Polonia Restituta
  - Order of the Cross of Grunwald (1st class)
  - Partisan Cross
  - Medal for Warsaw 1939–1945
  - Medal of Rodło
- Other countries:
  - Grand Cross of the Légion d'honneur (France)
  - Knight Grand Cross with Collar of the Order of Merit of the Italian Republic (Italy)
  - Order of Lenin (Soviet Union)
  - Jubilee Medal "In Commemoration of the 100th Anniversary of the Birth of Vladimir Ilyich Lenin" (Soviet Union)
  - Order of the Yugoslav Great Star (Yugoslavia)

== See also ==
- History of Poland (1945–89)
- Gomułka aliyah

Party political offices
Preceded by Paweł Finder	General Secretary of the Polish Workers' Party; 1943–1948	Succeeded by Bolesław Bierut (as General Secretary of the Polish United Workers' Party)
Preceded by Edward Ochab	General Secretary of the Polish United Workers' Party; 21 October 1956 – 20 December 1970	Succeeded by Edward Gierek
