= Zagórze, Sosnowiec =

District of Sosnowiec, Silesia

Zagórze
- District of Sosnowiec
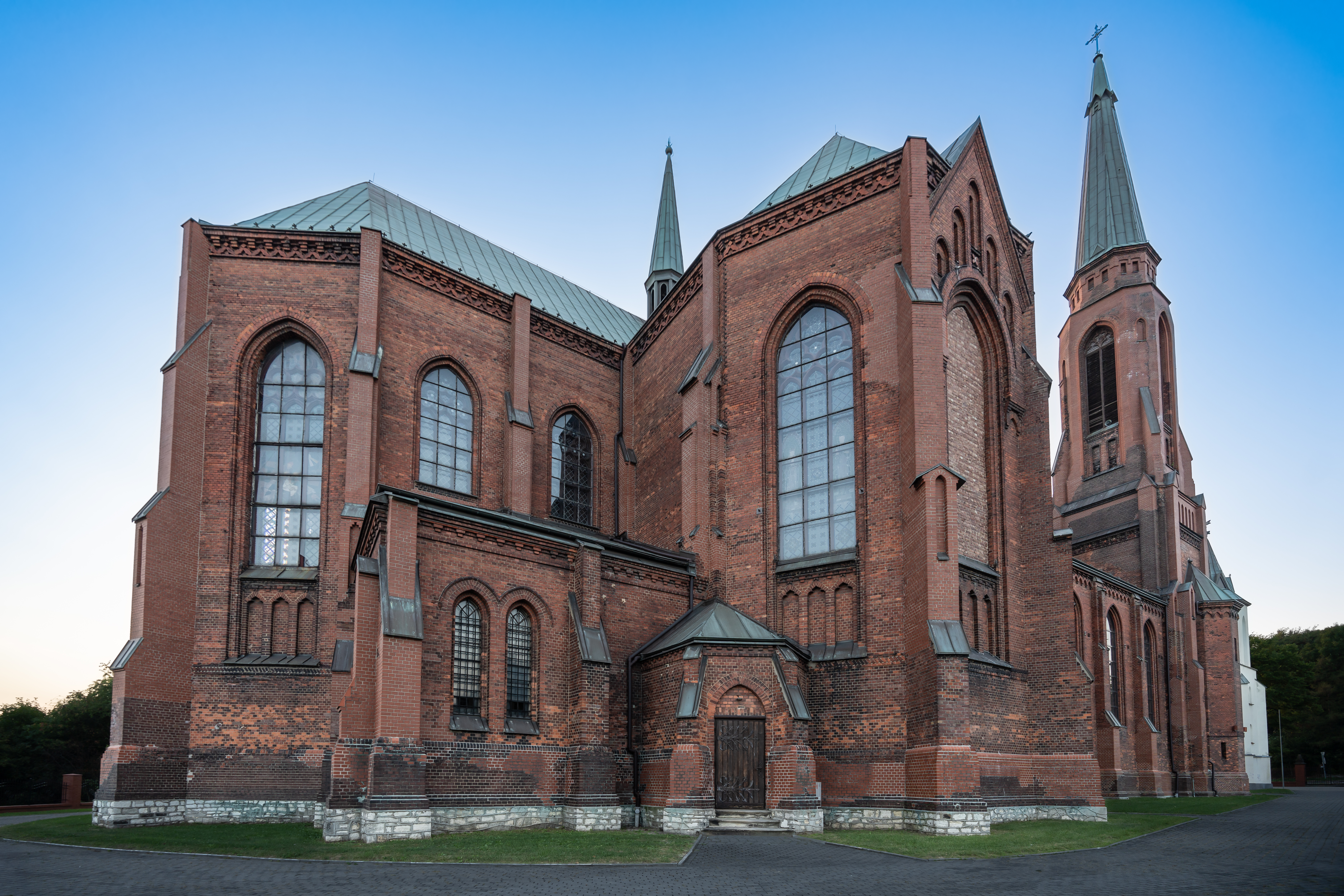
- Saint Joachim Church

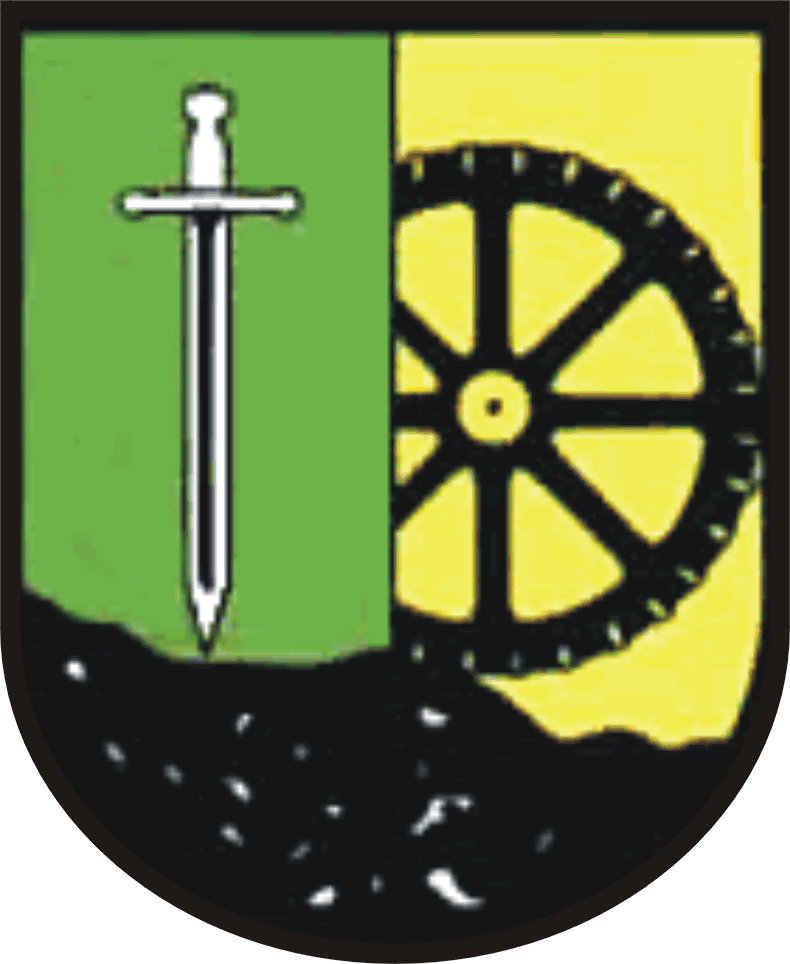
- Coat of arms
- Interactive map of Zagórze
- Coordinates: 50°18′10″N 19°11′15″E
- Country: Poland
- Voivodeship: Silesian
- County/City: Sosnowiec
- First mentioned: 1228
- Within city limits: 1975
- Time zone: UTC+1 (CET)
  - Summer (DST): UTC+2 (CEST)
- Vehicle registration: SO
- Primary airport: Katowice Airport

Zagórze is the biggest, northernmost district of Sosnowiec, totally transformed with building the Huta Katowice (expanded, reached as far as Klimontów).

== History ==
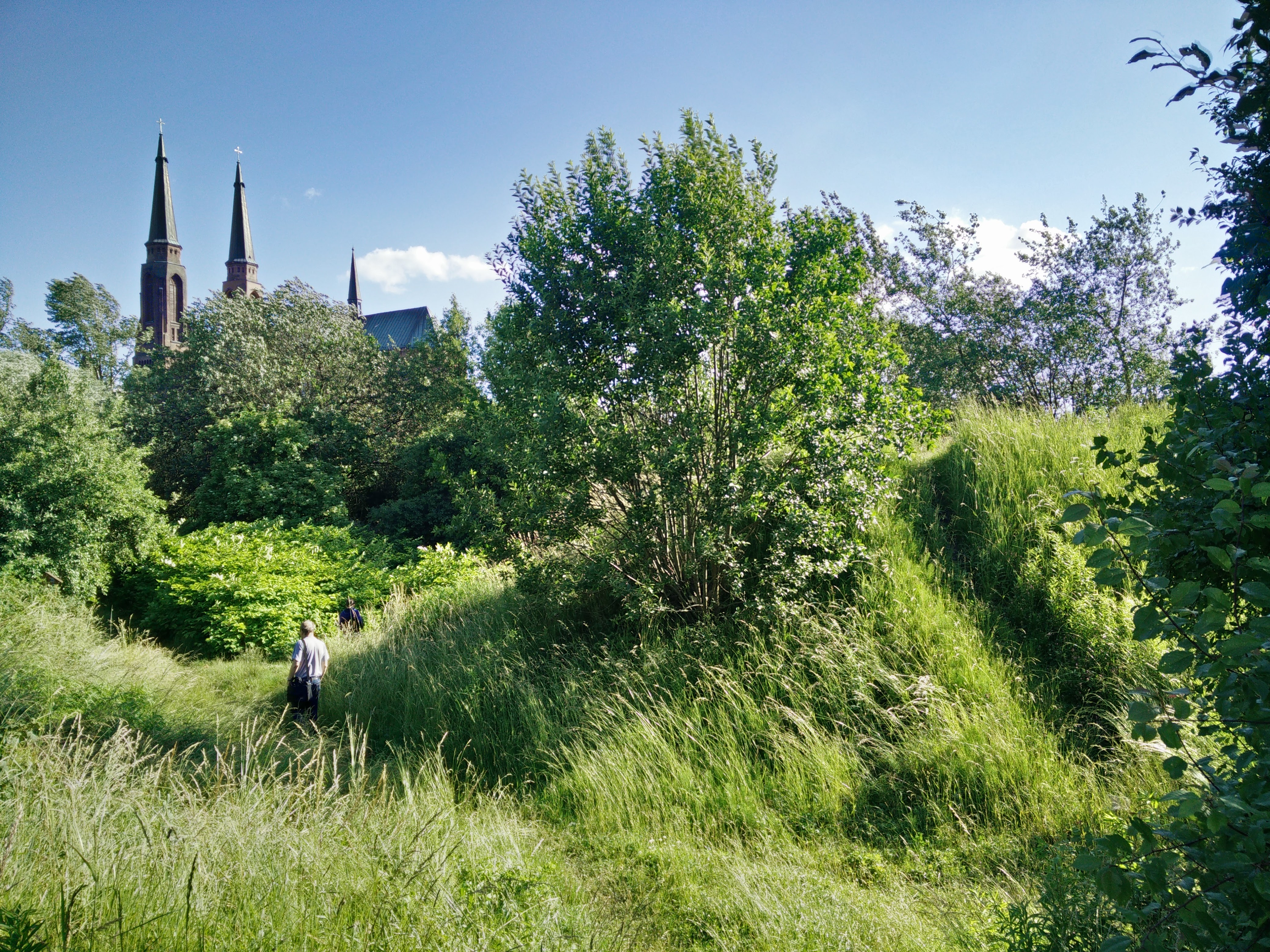
Former medieval stronghold in Zagórze

In the 10th century, the area became part of the emerging Polish state under the Piast dynasty. In the 11th-12th century, there was a metallurgical settlement in which lead and silver were smelted. The oldest known mention of Zagórze comes from a document from 1228. In the 14th century, a motte-and-bailey castle was built, and it is now an archaeological site. Archaeologists discovered tools from the Stone Age at the site. In the following centuries, Zagórze was a private village of Polish nobility, including the Jarocki and Mieroszewski families. There is a Neoclassical palace of the Mieroszewski family in Zagórze.

In 1827, it had a population of 457, which grew to 721 until the late 19th century. In 1842 a zinc smelter was established in Zagórze.

In 1975, Zagórze was included within the city limits of Sosnowiec as its new district. Before that, it was a separate town in Będzin County.
