= Contract Sejm =

Polish parliament elected in 1989

←	9th term Sejm of the Polish People's Republic	First Term Sejm	→

Overview
- Legislative body: Parliament of Poland
- Jurisdiction: Poland
- Meeting place: Sejm building complex, Warsaw, Poland
- Term: 18 June 1989 – 24 November 1991
- Election: 4 and 18 June 1989
- Government: Mazowiecki (12 September 1989 – 12 January 1991) OKP PZPR (until 1990) ZSL SD Bielecki (12 January – 23 December 1991) OKP KLD PC ZChN UD SD
- Website: sejm.gov.pl senat.gov.pl

Sejm
- Members: 460 deputies
- Marshal of the Sejm: Mikołaj Kozakiewicz, ZSL→PSL
- Deputy Marshals of the Sejm: Teresa Dobielińska-Eliszewska, SD; Tadeusz Fiszbach, PZPR→PUS; Olga Krzyżanowska, KO "S"→UD
- Party control: PRON (until 17 August 1989); Solidarity (KO "S")-backed coalition (from 17 August 1989)

Senate
- Members: 100 Senators
- Marshal of the Senate: Andrzej Stelmachowski, KO "S"
- Deputy Marshals of the Senate: Zofia Kuratowska, KO "S" Józef Ślisz, KO "S" Andrzej Wielowieyski, KO "S"
- Party control: Solidarity Citizens' Committee supermajority

Contract Sejm (Polish: Sejm kontraktowy) is a term commonly applied to the Sejm ("parliament") elected in the Polish parliamentary elections of 1989. The contract refers to an agreement reached by the Polish United Workers' Party and the Solidarność ("solidarity") movement during the Polish Round Table Agreement. The final agreement was signed on April 5, 1989. As a result, real political power was vested in a newly created bicameral legislature and in a president who would be the chief executive. Solidarność became a legitimate and legal political party.

Perhaps the most important decision reached during the talks was to allow for partially free elections to be held in Poland. All seats to the newly created Senate of Poland were to be elected democratically, as were 161 seats (35 percent of the total) in Sejm. The remaining 65% of the seats were reserved for the Communist Party and its satellite parties. In addition, all 35 seats elected via the national electoral list were reserved for the Party's candidates provided they gained a certain quota of support. This was to ensure that the most notable leaders of the Party were elected.

The outcome of the election was largely unpredictable. After all, Poland had not had a free and fair election since 1928, so there was little precedent to go by. It was clear that the Communists were unpopular, but there were no hard numbers as to how low support for them would actually fall. The Communist government still had control over most major media outlets and employed sports and television celebrities for candidates, as well as successful local personalities and businesspeople. Some members of the opposition were worried that such tactics would gain enough votes from voters who are disinterested in politics to give the Communists the legitimacy that they craved.

The election of June 4, 1989 (and the second round of June 18) brought a landslide victory to Solidarność: 99% of all the seats in the Senate and all of the possible seats in the Sejm. Out of 100 seats in the Senate, 99 were won by Solidarity and 1 by an independent candidate. Out of 35 seats of the country-wide list, only one was gained by the Party candidate (Adam Zieliński) and one by a United People's Party satellite party candidate, while the remainder were taken by the Solidarity in the second run. Altogether, out of 161 seats eligible, Solidarity took 160.

The turnout was surprisingly low: only 62.7% in the first round and 25% in the second. The outcome was a major surprise to both the Party and Solidarity. Only a few days before June 4 the party Central Committee was discussing the possible reaction of the Western world should Solidarity not win a single seat. At the same time the Solidarity leaders were trying to prepare some set of rules for the non-party MPs in a Communist-dominated parliament, as it was expected that the Solidarity would win not more than 20 seats.

Although the elections were not entirely democratic, they paved the way for the creation of Tadeusz Mazowiecki's cabinet and a peaceful transition to democracy, which was confirmed after the Polish parliamentary elections of 1991.

The Contract Sejm's opening session took place on 5 July 1989.

== Party breakdown ==
Clubs		Deputies (Sejm)			Senators (Senate)		
Results of the 1989 election	As of 26 October 1991	Results of the 1989 election	As of 26 October 1991	Change	Results of the 1989 election	As of 26 October 1991	Change
Polish United Workers' Party	Parliamentary Club of the Democratic Left	173	102	▼71	—	—	—
Civic Parliamentary Club		161	105	▼56	99	67	▼32
United People's Party	Polish People's Party	76	65	▼11	—	—	—
—	Democratic Union	—	49	▲49	—	29	▲29
—	Deputies' Labour Club	—	39	▲39	—	—	—
Democratic Party		27	21	▼6	—	—	—
PAX Association		10	10	Steady	—	—	—
Christian-Social Union		8	8	Steady	—	—	—
—	Christian People's Club	—	8	▲8	—	—	—
—	Club of Independent Deputies (former PZPR)	—	7	▲7	—	—	—
—	Club of Military Deputies (former PZPR)	—	7	▲7	—	—	—
—	Labour Solidarity	—	5	▲5	—	—	—
—	Polish People's Party (Mikołajczykowskie)	—	4	▲4	—	—	—
Polish Catholic Social Association		5	4	▼1	—	—	—
—	Parliamentary Ecological Club	—	3	▲3	—	—	—
Non-attached members		—	20	▲20	1	2	▲1
Total members		460	457	▼3	100	98	▼2
Vacant		—	3	▲3	—	2	▲2
Total seats		460			100		

== Governments ==
Portrait	Name Sejm District (Birth–Death)	Tenure			Ministerial offices held as prime minister	Party	Government
Portrait	Name Sejm District (Birth–Death)	Took office	Left office	Duration	Ministerial offices held as prime minister	Party	Government
	Czesław Kiszczak; None (1925–2015)	2 August 1989	24 August 1989 (no confidence vote)	22 days	Interior Minister (1981–1990)	Polish United Workers' Party	Kiszczak (PZPR–ZSL–SD)
	Tadeusz Mazowiecki; None (1927–2013)	24 August 1989	4 January 1991	1 year, 134 days	–	Solidarity Citizens' Committee	Mazowiecki; B: (KO‘S'–ZSL–PZPR–SD) E: (KO‘S'–UD–PSL–SD–ROAD–FPD)
	Tadeusz Mazowiecki; None (1927–2013)	24 August 1989	4 January 1991	1 year, 134 days	–	Democratic Union	Mazowiecki; B: (KO‘S'–ZSL–PZPR–SD) E: (KO‘S'–UD–PSL–SD–ROAD–FPD)
	Jan Krzysztof Bielecki; Gdańsk - 21 (born 1951)	4 January 1991	6 December 1991	337 days	–	Liberal Democratic Congress	Bielecki (KLD–ZChN–PC–SD)
