= Stefan Ignar =

Polish politician

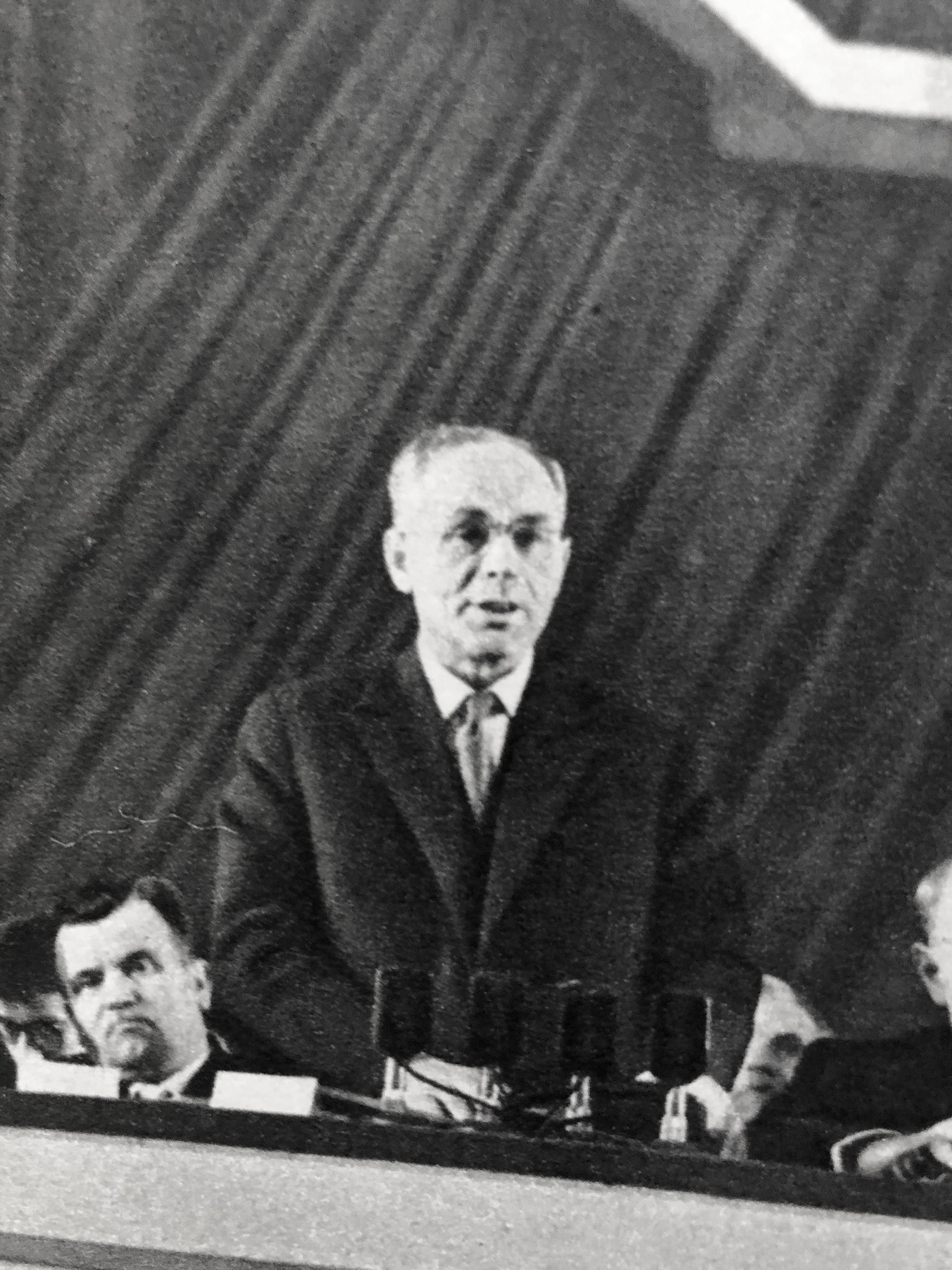

Deputy Chairman of the State Council of the Polish People's Republic
- In office 20 November 1952 – 13 November 1956

Member of the State Council of the Polish People's Republic
- In office 20 November 1952 – 13 November 1956, and again from 27 June 1969 to 28 March 1972

Deputy Prime Minister
- In office 24 October 1956 – 28 June 1969

Chairman of the United People's Party
- In office 19 October 1956 – 28 May 1962
- Preceded by: Władysław Kowalski
- Succeeded by: Czesław Wycech

Chairman of the United People's Party
- In office 8 May 1981 – 6 November 1981
- Preceded by: Stanisław Gucwa
- Succeeded by: Roman Malinowski

Personal details
- Born: 17 February 1908 Bałdrzychów
- Died: 23 January 1992 (aged 83) Warsaw
- Party: People's Party (Poland) (1931–1945); Polish People's Party (1945–1949) (1945–1949); United People's Party (Poland) (1949-1989)
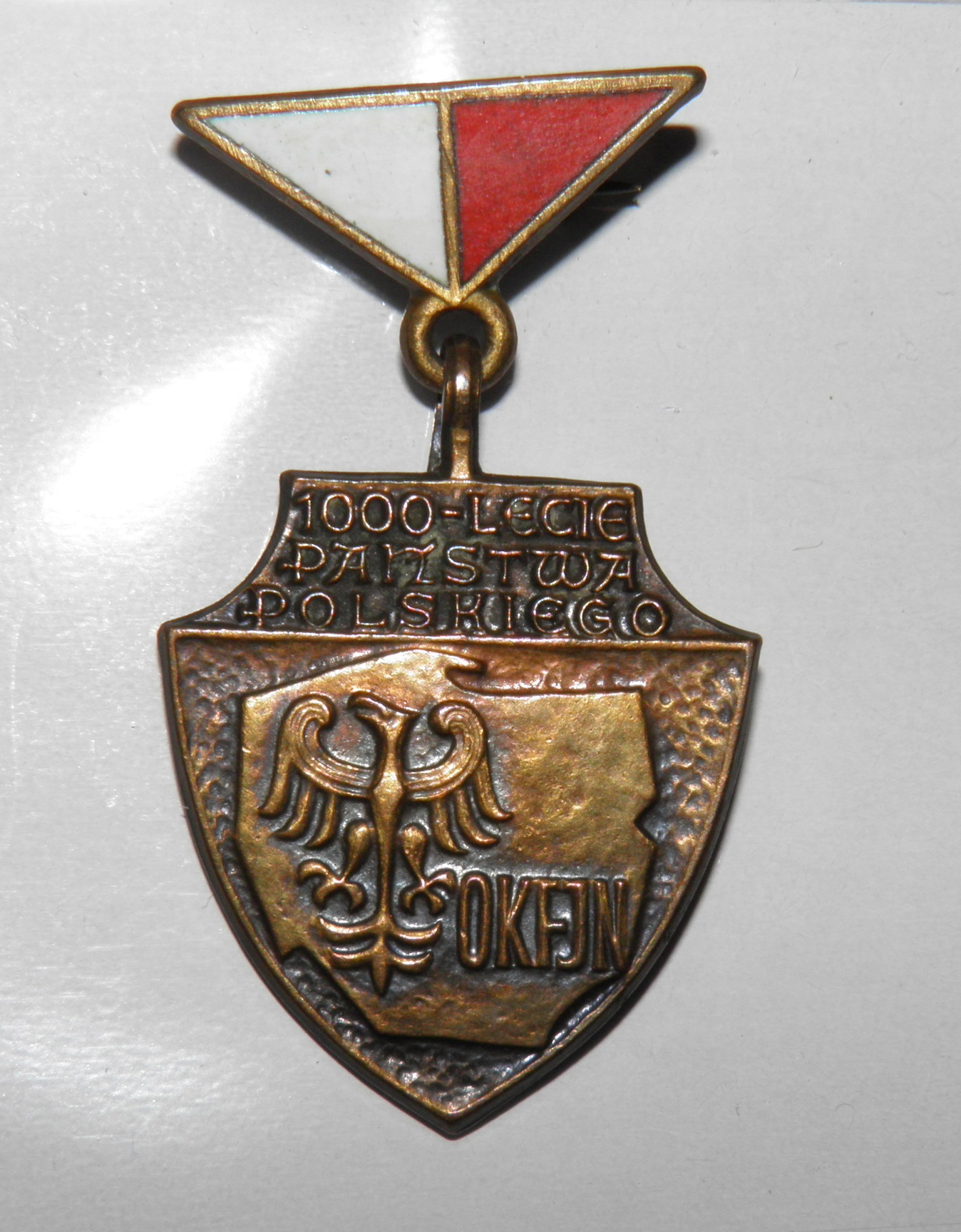
- Awards

Stefan Ignar, who went by "Kurek" and "Sylwester",. (February 17, 1908 – January 23, 1992) was a Polish politician, a member of the rural movement, a soldier in the Peasants' Battalions, a full professor of economic sciences, and the chairman of the United People's Party from 1956 to 1962 and in 1981, as well as the chairman of the Central Board of the Polish-Soviet Friendship Society from 1955 to 1957. He served as a deputy to the Sejm of the Polish People's Republic during the 1st, 3rd, 4th, 5th, and 6th convocations of the Sejm of the Polish People's Republic, Deputy Prime Minister of Poland from 1956 to 1969, deputy chairman of the Council of State from 1952 to 1956, and a member of the Council of State from 1969 to 1972.

== Biography ==
He was born into a peasant family as the son of Maciej and Jadwiga. In 1927, he graduated from the private 8-grade Bogumił Braun Humanistic Gymnasium in Łódź, and in 1931, he obtained a master's degree in philosophy from the University of Poznań.

From 1933 to 1935, he lectured at the People's University in Gać. He then moved back to Łódź, where from 1935 to 1937, he was an editor and publisher of the bi-weekly Chłopskie Życie, and from 1938 to 1939, the editor of the weekly Wici.

From 1931, he was a member of the People's Party. After the occupation, he engaged in party activities. From 1940 to 1944, he was the chairman of the Provincial Leadership of the People's Movement and a member of the Command of the Łódź District of the Peasants' Battalions. He became the editor of the underground magazine "Drogi ruchu ludowego" and also taught in clandestine classes. In March 1945, as a supporter of reaching an agreement with the PWP, he opposed the policy of the Central Leadership of the People's Movement and withdrew from the People's Party "Roch".

After World War II, from 1945 to 1949, he was an academic teacher of Life Sciences at the University of Łódź, and from 1949 to 1978 at the Warsaw University of Life Sciences. Here, in 1949, he received the title of associate professor, and in 1964, a full professor of economic sciences.

He was involved in the rural youth movement. In 1945 and from 1946 to 1947, he was the Vice-President, and from 1947 to 1948, the President of the Central Board of the Association of Rural Youth of the Polish Republic "Wici". From 1948 to 1950, he chaired the Supreme Council of the Union of Polish Youth. From 1948 to 1950, he was also the president of the Supreme Board of the Union of "Self-Help of the Peasantry". In 1947, he joined the pro-communist Polish People's Party, which in 1949 co-created the United People's Party. He served on the governing bodies of the People's Parties: from 1935 to 1939 in the Supreme Council of the People's Party, from 1948 to 1949 in the Presidium of the National Executive Committee of the People's Party, from 1949 to 1984 in the National Executive Committee (in the later period, the term "Executive" was abandoned), from 1949 to 1980 and in 1981 in the Presidium of the NEC (NEC) UPP, from 1956 to 1962 and from May to November 1981 as the president of the NEC UPP.

He held high state functions – in 1952, he was the Deputy Chairman of the State Economic Planning Commission from 1952 to 1956, the Deputy Chairman of the Council of State, from 1956 to 1969, the Deputy Prime Minister of Poland, and from 1969 to 1972, a member of the Council of State. From 1970 to 1978, he was the director of the Institute of Agricultural Economics and Agricultural Policy at the Warsaw University of Life Sciences.

In November 1949, he became a member of the All-Polish Committee for the Celebration of the 70th Birthday of Joseph Stalin. On March 6, 1953, he became a member of the Nationwide Committee for the Commemoration of the Memory of Joseph Stalin

From 1952 to 1976, he was a member of the 1st, 3rd, 4th, 5th, and 6th convocations of the Sejm of the Polish People's Republic. From 1952 to 1956, he was a member of the Presidium of the All-Poland Committee of the National Front, and from 1958 to 1983, of the Front of National Unity. From 1983 to 1989, he was a member of the National Council of the Polish–Soviet Friendship Society (of which he was the chairman from 1955 to 1957). In 1981, he became a member of the Committee for the Publication of Selected Works by Józef Chałasiński.

== Orders and decorations ==
- Order of the Builders of People's Poland, awarded in 1978
- Grand Cross of the Order of Polonia Restituta, awarded in 1964
- Order of the Banner of Labour 1st Class
- Order of the Cross of Grunwald, awarded 3rd Class Ribbon on 13 September 1946
- Partisan Cross
- Medal of the 10th Anniversary of People's Poland
- Medal of the 30th Anniversary of People's Poland
- Medal of the 40th Anniversary of People's Poland
- Badge of the 1000th anniversary of the Polish State
- Golden Badge "For Merit to the Warsaw Voivodeship"

== See also ==
- Cabinet of Bolesław Bierut and Józef Cyrankiewicz
- Second Cabinet of Józef Cyrankiewicz
- State Council of the Polish People's Republic
- Deputy Prime Ministers of the People's Republic of Poland

== Bibliography ==
- Janusz Gmitruk: Zjednoczone Stronnictwo Ludowe, 1949–1989, 2004, pp. 123–125.
- Who's Who in Poland, Interpress Publishing, Warsaw 1984, p. 307.
