= 1989 Polish parliamentary election =

- 4 June 1989 (first round); 18 June 1989 (second round)
- Registered: First round: 27,362,313 Second round: 27,026,146 (Sejm), 3,104,127 (Senate)
- Sejm
- All 460 seats in the Sejm 161 seats up for free election 231 seats needed for a majority
- Turnout: First round: 17,156,170 (62.70%) Second round: 6,843,872 (25.32%)
Party	Leader	Seats
Seats reserved for the Patriotic Movement for National Rebirth (299)
Polish United Workers' Party	Wojciech Jaruzelski	173
United People's Party	Roman Malinowski	76
Alliance of Democrats	Jerzy Jóźwiak	27
PAX Association	Zenon Komender	10
Christian-Social Union	Kazimierz Morawski	8
Polish Catholic Social Association	Wiesław Gwiżdż	5
Freely-contested seats (161)
Solidarity Citizens' Committee	Lech Wałęsa	161
This lists parties that won seats. See the complete results below.
- Senate
- All 100 seats in the Senate; 51 seats needed for a majority
- Turnout: First round: 17,156,170 (62.70%) Second round: 1,320,816 (42.55%)
Party	Seats
Solidarity Citizens' Committee	99
Patriotic Movement for National Rebirth	1
This lists parties that won seats. See the complete results below.

Government before	Government after election
Rakowski cabinet PZPR—ZSL—SD	Mazowiecki cabinet (Note: Following the election, Czesław Kiszczak of PZPR was designated Prime Minister by President Wojciech Jaruzelski, however, the bloc parties ZSL and SD, together forming 1/5th of the Sejm, broke away and gave support to Solidarity which won 1/3rd of seats in the Sejm - all it was allowed to contest - and Tadeusz Mazowiecki was designated and sworn in as Prime Minister.); Solidarity—ZSL—SD

Parliamentary elections were held in Poland on 4 June 1989 to elect members of the Sejm and the recreated Senate, with a second round on 18 June. They were the first free and fair elections in the country since the communist government abandoned its monopoly of power in April 1989 and the first elections in the Eastern Bloc that resulted in the communist government losing power.

Not all seats in the Sejm were allowed to be contested, but the resounding victory of the Solidarity opposition in the freely contested races (the rest of the Sejm seats and all of the Senate) paved the way to the end of communist rule in Poland. Solidarity won all of the freely contested seats in the Sejm, and all but one seat in the Senate, which was scored by a government-aligned nonpartisan candidate. Most crucially, the election served as evidence of widespread dissatisfaction with the government. In the aftermath of the election, Poland became the first country of the Eastern Bloc in which democratically elected representatives gained real power. Although the elections were not entirely democratic, they led to the formation of a non-communist government led by Tadeusz Mazowiecki and a peaceful transition to democracy in Poland and elsewhere in Central and Eastern Europe.

== Background ==
In May and August 1988 massive waves of workers' strikes broke out in the Polish People's Republic. The strikes, as well as street demonstrations, continued throughout spring and summer, ending in early September 1988. These actions shook the communist regime of the country to such an extent that it decided to begin talking about recognising Solidarity (Polish: Solidarność), an "unofficial" labor union that subsequently grew into a political movement. As a result, later that year, the regime decided to negotiate with the opposition, which opened the way for the 1989 Round Table Agreement. The second, much bigger wave of strikes (August 1988) surprised both the government and top leaders of Solidarity, who were not expecting actions of such intensity. These strikes were mostly organized by local activists, who had no idea that their leaders from Warsaw had already started secret negotiations with the communists.

An agreement was reached by the communist Polish United Workers' Party (PZPR) and the Solidarity movement during the Round Table negotiations. The final agreement was signed on 4 April 1989, ending communist rule in Poland. As a result, real political power was vested in a newly created bicameral legislature (the Sejm, with the recreated Senate), whilst the office of president was re-established. Solidarity became a legitimate and legal political party: On 7 April 1989 the existing parliament changed the election law and changed the constitution (through the April Novelization), and on 17 April, the Supreme Court of Poland registered Solidarity. Soon after the agreement was signed, Solidarity leader Lech Wałęsa travelled to Rome to be received by the Polish Pope John Paul II.

Constituencies used in the election

Perhaps the most important decision reached during the Round Table talks was to allow for partially free elections to be held in Poland. (A fully free election was promised "in four years"). All seats in the newly recreated Senate of Poland were to be elected democratically, as were 161 seats (35 percent of the total) in Sejm. The remaining 65% of the seats in the Sejm were reserved for the PZPR and its satellite parties (United People's Party (ZSL), Alliance of Democrats (SD), and communist-aligned Catholic parties). These seats were still technically elected, but only government-sponsored candidates were allowed to compete for them. In addition, all 35 seats elected via the national electoral list were reserved for the PZPR's candidates provided they gained a certain quota of support. This was to ensure that the most notable leaders of the PZPR were elected.

The outcome of the election was largely unpredictable, and pre-electoral opinion polls were inconclusive. After all, Poland had not had a truly fair election since the 1920s, so there was little precedent to go by. The last contested elections were those of 1947, in the midst of communist-orchestrated violent oppression and electoral fraud. This time, there would be open and relatively fair competition for many seats, both between communist and Solidarity candidates, and, in some cases, between various communist candidates. Although censorship was still in force, the opposition was allowed to campaign much more freely than before, thanks to a new newspaper, Gazeta Wyborcza, and the reactivation of Tygodnik Solidarność. Solidarity was also given access to televised media, being allocated 23% of electoral time on Polish Television. There were also no restrictions on financial support. Although the Communists were clearly unpopular, there were no hard numbers as to how low support for them would actually fall. A rather flawed survey carried out in April, days after the Round Table Agreement was signed, suggested that over 60% of the surveyed wanted Solidarity to cooperate with the government. Another survey a week later, regarding the Senate elections, showed that 48% of the surveyed supported the opposition, 14% supported the communist government, and 38% were undecided. In such a situation, both sides faced another unfamiliar aspect - the electoral campaign. The communists knew they were guaranteed 65% of the seats, and expected a difficult but winnable contest; in fact they were concerned about a possibility of "winning too much" - they desired some opposition, which would serve to legitimize their government both internally and internationally. The communist government still had control over most major media outlets and employed sports and television celebrities as candidates, as well as successful local personalities. Some members of the opposition were worried that such tactics would gain enough votes from the more politically-disinterested segment of the population to give the communists the legitimacy that they craved. Only a few days before June 4, the party Central Committee was discussing the possible reaction of the Western world should Solidarity not win a single seat. At the same time, the Solidarity leaders were trying to prepare some set of rules for the non-party MPs in a communist-dominated parliament, as it was expected that the party would not win more than 20 seats. Solidarity was also complaining that the way electoral districts were drawn was not favourable towards it; indeed, the Council of State allocated more open seats beyond the minimum of one to constituencies where Solidarity was expected to lose.

== Participating parties ==
=== Member parties of the Patriotic Movement for National Rebirth ===
Party		Ideology	Leader(s)	Leader since	Leader's seat	Candidates		
Party		Ideology	Leader(s)	Leader since	Leader's seat	Sejm (constituency)	Sejm (national list)	Senate
PZPR	Polish United Workers' Party; Polska Zjednoczona Partia Robotnicza	Communism	Wojciech Jaruzelski	18 October 1981	Did not run (candidate for President)	680	17	178
ZSL	United People's Party; Zjednoczone Stronnictwo Ludowe	Agrarian socialism	Roman Malinowski	1981	Ran under the National list (lost)	284	9	87
SD	Alliance of Democrats; Stronnictwo Demokratyczne	Democratic socialism	Jerzy Jóźwiak	18 April 1989	Ran under the National list (lost)	84	3	67

=== Opposition groups ===
As the "leading role" of the Communist Party was not abolished at this time, all opposition candidates formally stood as independents.

Party		Ideology	Leader(s)	Leader since	Leader's seat	Candidates	
Party		Ideology	Leader(s)	Leader since	Leader's seat	Sejm	Senate
KO "S"	Solidarity Citizens' Committee; Komitet Obywatelski "Solidarność"	Liberal democracy Anti-communism	Lech Wałęsa	18 December 1988 (of political organization)	Did not run	161	100
KPN	Confederation of Independent Poland; Konfederacja Polski Niepodległej	Sanationism; Anti-communism	Leszek Moczulski	1 September 1979	Ran in Kraków-Podgórze (lost)	16	6
SP	Christian-Democratic Labour Party Chrześcijańsko-Demokratyczne Stronnictwo Pracy	Christian democracy Political Catholicism	Władysław Siła-Nowicki	12 February 1989	Ran in Warsaw-Żoliborz (lost)		
GRKK "S"	Working Group of the National Commission of Solidarity; Grupa Robocza Komisji Krajowej NSZZ „Solidarność”	Liberal democracy Anti-communism	Andrzej Gwiazda	April 1987	Did not run		
UPR	Real Politics Union; Unia Polityki Realnej	Classical liberalism Libertarianism	Janusz Korwin-Mikke	14 November 1987	Ran for Senator in Wrocław Voivodeship (lost)		

== Electoral system ==
The Sejm was elected using a two-round system, with multiple seats per constituency; however, this was not a true multiple non-transferable vote system due to the unusual system of reserving seats to parties in advance. The Council of State was responsible for drawing out constituencies, which would have between two and five seats. Each voter had multiple votes, one for each seat in the constituency, and each seat was elected on its own separate ballot. In addition, up to 10% of the seats in the Sejm would be reserved to the national list; the final settled number of national list seats was 35.

In the constituencies, only the PZPR and its satellite parties were allowed to nominate candidates in their own name; Solidarity candidates had to formally run as independents. The seats in each constituency would be reserved to candidates of one of the PRON member parties or to independent candidates (a category which de facto also included opposition parties), based on an allocation predetermined by the Council of State "pursuant to the concluded roundtable agreement". The constituencies, as well as the seats within each constituency, were numbered in a single consecutive series. At least one seat in each constituency was guaranteed for independent candidates. Within each seat, the elections were multi-candidate, but only between candidates of the category to which the seat was reserved (for example, only PZPR candidates could run in the PZPR-reserved seats). Rather than making a mark next to the name of the candidate which he desired to vote for, a voter had to strike out the names of all other candidates; leaving two or more names unstruck would have spoiled the ballot.

The National list was elected in a similar format to previous Polish elections; voters were presented with a single slate of candidates, all belonging to the PZPR and its satellite parties; Solidarity was invited to submit candidates to the national list, but declined this invitation. However, unlike previous elections, voters could vote against individual candidates on this slate by striking out their name from the ballot, rather than having to reject the slate in its entirety. If a candidate's name was not struck out, a vote was presumed to be cast for him. To be elected, a candidate on the national list had to be supported by at least 50% of the vote. During the campaign, it was also ruled that writing an X over all the names in the National list ballot would count as a vote against all of them. The electoral law made no provision about what would happen in case a candidate is rejected; for that reason, in the second round of the election, new seats, having the same party reservations as the rejected national list candidates, were allocated to the constituencies.

The Senate was also elected using two-round multiple non-transferable vote under the same electoral law as the Sejm, albeit with modifications: Each voivodeship elected two Senators at-large (with the exception of Warsaw and Katowice voivodeships, which elected three), seats were open to all candidates running rather than being reserved to parties, and all the seats were elected on a single common ballot.

== Candidate selection and campaign ==
=== Solidarity ===
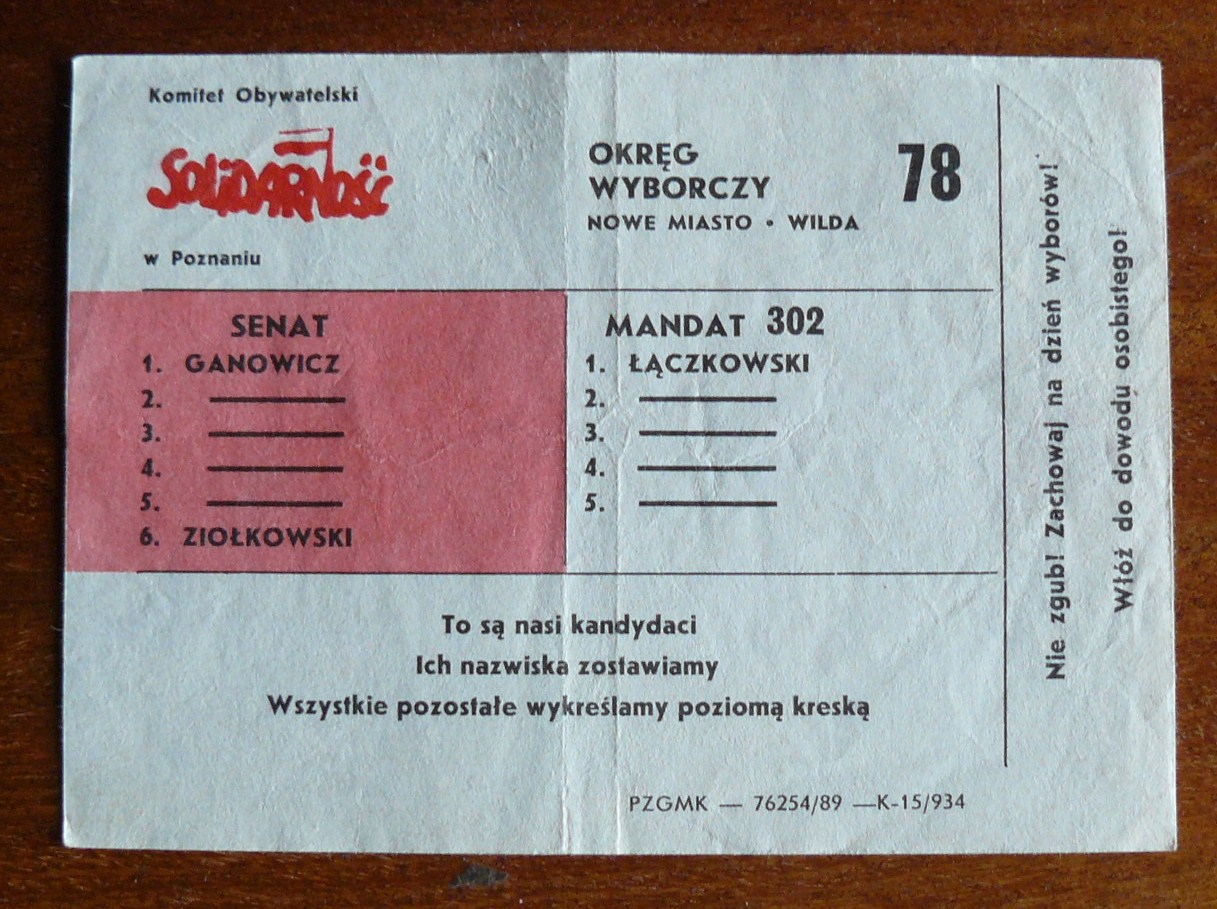
A how-to-vote card distributed by Solidarity

The Solidarity campaign made use of how-to-vote cards that included only the names of the Solidarity candidates, with strikethrough lines taking the place of the other candidates' names. Although the how-to-vote cards concerned only those seats which Solidarity was allowed to contest, the Solidarity campaign also included some degree of campaigning against government candidates on the national list.

On 8 April 1989, the Solidarity Citizens' Committee decided it would field only one candidate for each available seat, to prevent vote-splitting. The list of candidates was determined centrally by Solidarity leadership, rather than nominated from local branches. Lech Wałęsa chose not to field his own candidacy, fearing that his chances of winning a seat were low and that the ensuing personal loss would carry with it a loss of authority for all Solidarity MPs.

== Results ==
"High Noon, June 4, 1989." Solidarity Citizens' Committee election poster by Tomasz Sarnecki.

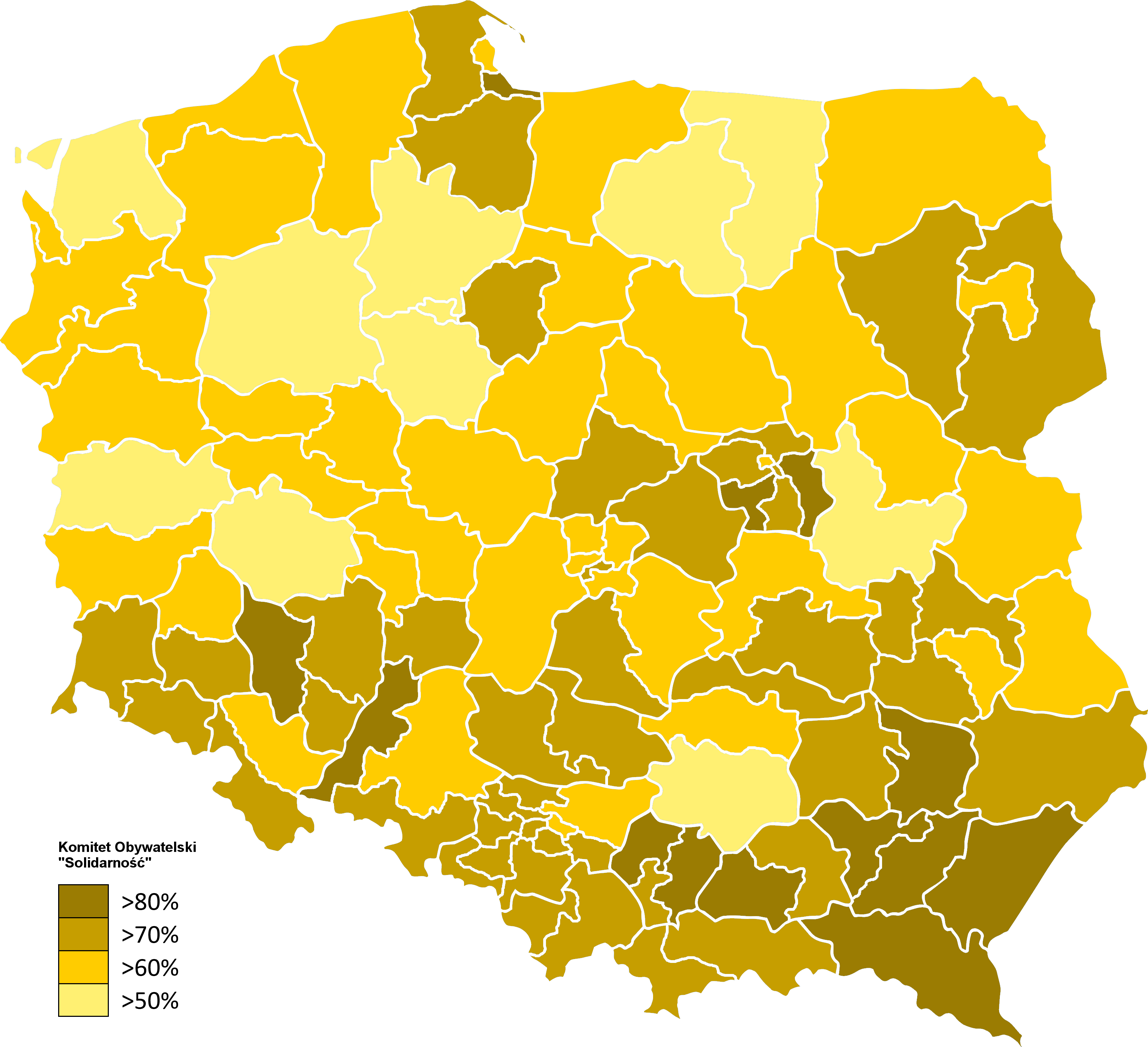
Votes for Solidarity by constituency

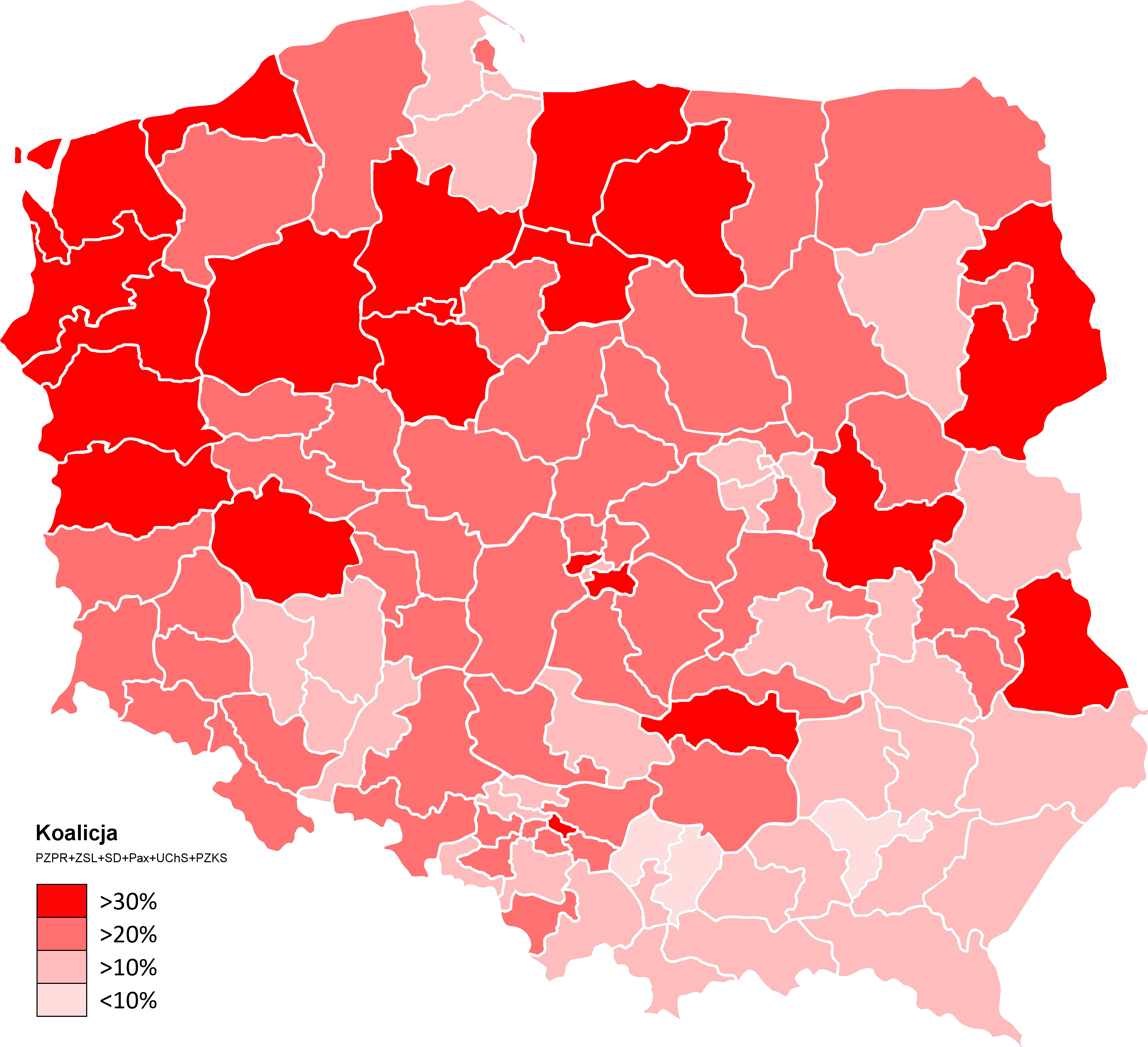
Votes for government coalition by constituency

The outcome was a major surprise to both the PZPR and Solidarity. Solidarity's electoral campaign was much more successful than expected. It won a landslide victory, winning all but one of the 100 seats in the Senate, and all of the contested seats in the Sejm; the sole seat in the Senate which was not won by Solidarity was won by Henryk Stokłosa, a non-partisan businessman aligned with the communists. Out of 35 seats in the country-wide list in which Solidarity was not allowed to compete, only one was gained by PZPR candidate (Adam Zieliński) and one by a ZSL satellite party candidate in the first round; none of the others attained the required 50% majority. The communists regained some seats during the second round, but the first round was highly humiliating to them, the psychological impact of it has been called "shattering". Government-supported candidates competing against Solidarity members gained 10 to 40% of votes in total, varying by constituency. Altogether, out of 161 seats eligible, Solidarity took all 161 (160 in the first round and one more in the second). In the 161 districts in which opposition candidates competed against pro-government candidates, the opposition candidates obtained 72% of the vote (16,369,237). Even in those seats which were reserved for the Communist-aligned parties, three candidates unofficially supported by Solidarity - Teresa Liszcz and Władysław Żabiński of the ZSL and Marian Czerwiński of the PZPR - defeated their own party's "mainstream" candidates and won seats in the Sejm.

While Solidarity having secured the 35% of seats available to it, the remaining 65% was divided between the PZPR and its satellite parties (37.6% to PZPR, 16.5% to ZSL, 5.8% to SD, with 4% distributed between small communist-aligned Catholic parties, PAX and UChS). The distribution of seats among the PZPR and its allies was known beforehand.

Voter turnout was surprisingly low: only 62.7% in the first round and 25% in the second. The second round, with the exception of one district, was a contest between two most popular pro-government candidates. This explains low turnout in the second round as pro-opposition voters (the majority of the electorate) had limited interest in these races; however, Solidarity gave its endorsement to 55 candidates of pro-government parties, including 21 from the PZPR, who ran in opposition to their own party's leadership, and encouraged its supporters to vote for them.

=== Sejm ===
Party or alliance		First round (constituency)			First round (national list)			Second round			Total seats	+/–
Party or alliance		Votes	%	Seats	Votes	%	Seats	Votes	%	Seats	Total seats	+/–
Seats reserved for the Patriotic Movement for National Rebirth	Polish United Workers' Party			1			1			171	173	−72
Seats reserved for the Patriotic Movement for National Rebirth	United People's Party			2			1			73	76	−30
Seats reserved for the Patriotic Movement for National Rebirth	Democratic Party			0			0			27	27	−8
Seats reserved for the Patriotic Movement for National Rebirth	PAX Association			0			0			10	10	New
Seats reserved for the Patriotic Movement for National Rebirth	Christian-Social Union			0			0			8	8	New
Seats reserved for the Patriotic Movement for National Rebirth	Polish Catholic-Social Association			0			0			5	5	New
"Non-partisan" contested seats	Solidarity Citizens' Committee			160						1	161	New
"Non-partisan" contested seats	Patriotic Movement for National Rebirth independents			0						0	0	−74
"Non-partisan" contested seats	Confederation of Independent Poland			0						0	0	New
"Non-partisan" contested seats	Minor opposition (Note: including Working Group of the National Commission of Solidarity, Labour Party, and Real Politics Union)			0						0	0	New
Total				163			2			295	460	0
Total votes		17,156,170	–		17,053,171	–		6,843,872	–			
Registered voters/turnout		27,362,313	62.70		27,362,313	62.32		27,026,146	25.32			

==== Votes in reserved seats ====
Party or alliance		Constituency (first round)			National list			Constituency (second round)			Total seats	+/–
Party or alliance		Votes	%	Seats	Votes	%	Seats	Votes	%	Seats	Total seats	+/–
Patriotic Movement for National Rebirth	Polish United Workers' Party	22,734,348	59.26	1	132,845,385	47.19	1			171	173	−72
Patriotic Movement for National Rebirth	United People's Party	8,865,102	23.11	2	74,921,230	26.62	1			73	76	−30
Patriotic Movement for National Rebirth	Democratic Party	3,961,124	10.32	0	24,814,903	8.82	0			27	27	−8
Patriotic Movement for National Rebirth	PAX Association	1,216,681	3.17	0	24,269,761	8.62	0			10	10	New
Patriotic Movement for National Rebirth	Christian-Social Union	907,901	2.37	0	16,601,896	5.90	0			8	8	New
Patriotic Movement for National Rebirth	Polish Catholic-Social Association	681,199	1.78	0	8,029,911	2.85	0			5	5	New
Total		38,366,355	100.00	3	281,483,086	100.00	2			294	299	–

==== Votes in contested seats ====
Party	First round			Second round			Total seats	+/–
Party	Votes	%	Seats	Votes	%	Seats	Total seats	+/–
Solidarity Citizens' Committee	16,433,809	71.28	160	63,527	55.62	1	161	New
Patriotic Movement for National Rebirth independents	4,937,750	21.42	0	41,366	36.22	0	0	−74
Confederation of Independent Poland	122,132	0.53	0				0	New
Minor opposition	171,866	0.75	0				0	New
Against all	1,389,524	6.03	–	9,317	8.16	–	–	–
Total	23,055,081	100.00	160	114,210	100.00	1	161	0

==== By constituency ====
No.	Constituency	Total seats	Seats won						
No.	Constituency	Total seats	PZPR	KO "S"	ZSL	SD	PAX	UChS	PZKS
1	Warszawa-Śródmieście	3	1	1			1		
2	Warszawa-Mokotów	5	2	1		1	1		
3	Warszawa-Ochota	4	2	1	1				
4	Warszawa-Wola	5	2	2				1	
5	Warszawa-Żoliborz	3	2	1					
6	Warszawa-Praga-Północ	5	2	1	1				1
7	Warszawa-Praga-Południe	5	3	2					
8	Biała Podlaska	4	2	1	1				
9	Białystok	4	1	1	1	1			
10	Bielsk Podlaski	4	1	1	1			1	
11	Bielsko-Biała	5	2	2		1			
12	Andrychów	5	2	2	1				
13	Bydgoszcz	5	3	1				1	
14	Chojnice	5	1	1	1	1	1		
15	Inowrocław	4	1	2	1				
16	Chełm	4	1	1	2				
17	Ciechanów	5	2	1	1			1	
18	Częstochowa	5	2	1		1			1
19	Lubliniec	4	1	2	1				
20	Elbląg	5	2	1	1	1			
21	Gdańsk	5	2	2		1			
22	Gdynia	4	1	2					1
23	Tczew	4	2	1	1				
24	Wejherowo	4	1	1	1	1			
25	Gorzów Wielkopolski	5	1	2	1			1	
26	Choszczno	2	1	1					
27	Jelenia Góra	3	1	1	1				
28	Bolesławiec	3	1	2					
29	Kalisz	4	2	2					
30	Ostrów Wielkopolski	4	2	1	1				
31	Kępno	2		1	1				
32	Katowice	5	2	1		1	1		
33	Sosnowiec	4	2	1		1			
34	Jaworzno	4	2	1					1
35	Dąbrowa Górnicza	4	2	1	1				
36	Bytom	5	2	3					
37	Gliwice	5	3	2					
38	Chorzów	5	3	1					1
39	Tychy	5	2	3					
40	Rybnik	5	3	2					
41	Wodzisław Śląski	5	2	2	1				
42	Kielce	5	1	2	1	1			
43	Skarżysko-Kamienna	5	3	2					
44	Pińczów	4	1	2	1				
45	Konin	5	2	2	1				
46	Koszalin	4	3	1					
47	Szczecinek	4	2	1	1				
48	Kraków-Śródmieście	5	2	1	2				
49	Kraków-Nowa Huta	5	1	2	1		1		
50	Kraków-Podgórze	5	2	2		1			
51	Krosno	5	2	2	1				
52	Legnica	3	1	1	1				
53	Lubin	3	1	2					
54	Leszno	4	1	2	1				
55	Lublin	5	1	1	1	1	1		
56	Kraśnik	3	2	1					
57	Puławy	3	1	1	1				
58	Lubartów	2		1	1				
59	Łomża	5	2	2	1				
60	Łódź-Bałuty	4	2	1			1		
61	Łódź-Śródmieście	5	3	1		1			
62	Łódź-Górna	3	1	2					
63	Łódź-Widzew	2		1	1				
64	Nowy Sącz	5	2	1	1			1	
65	Nowy Targ	4	1	2		1			
66	Biskupiec	3	1	1	1				
67	Olsztyn	5	1	2	1	1			
68	Opole	5	2	1	1	1			
69	Kędzierzyn-Koźle	4	1	1	1			1	
70	Brzeg	2	1	1					
71	Ostrołęka	5	1	2	2				
72	Piła	5	2	2	1				
73	Piotrków Trybunalski	5	2	2		1			
74	Bełchatów	3	1	1	1				
75	Płock	4	1	2	1				
76	Kutno	4	1	1	1		1		
77	Poznań-Grunwald	5	2	2	1				
78	Poznań-Nowe Miasto	5	2	1		1	1		
79	Poznań-Stare Miasto	5	2	2	1				
80	Przemyśl	5	2	2	1				
81	Radom	5	2	1	1	1			
82	Białobrzegi	4	1	1	1	1			
83	Rzeszów	5	2	1	1	1			
84	Mielec	4	2	1	1				
85	Garwolin	4	1	2	1				
86	Siedlce	4	1	1	2				
87	Sieradz	5	1	3	1				
88	Skierniewice	5	2	2	1				
89	Słupsk	5	2	2	1				
90	Suwałki	5	2	2	1				
91	Szczecin	5	2	2		1			
92	Świnoujście	3	1	1	1				
93	Stargard Szczeciński	3	1	1	1				
94	Tarnobrzeg	4	1	2	1				
95	Stalowa Wola	3	1	2					
96	Tarnów	5	1	2	2				
97	Dębica	3	1	1	1				
98	Toruń	5	1	2	1		1		
99	Grudziądz	3	1	1	1				
100	Wałbrzych	5	3	1	1				
101	Świdnica	4	1	2		1			
102	Włocławek	5	2	1	1	1			
103	Wrocław-Psie Pole	5	2	2	1				
104	Wrocław-Fabryczna	4	2	1				1	
105	Wrocław-Krzyki	4	1	1	1	1			
106	Zamość	5	2	2	1				
107	Zielona Góra	4	1	1	1	1			
108	Żary	3	1	2					
National list		2	1		1				
Total		460	173	161	76	27	10	8	5
Source: Sejm, Sejm, Sejm

=== Senate ===
Party	First round			Second round			Total seats
Party	Votes	%	Seats	Votes	%	Seats	Total seats
Solidarity Citizens' Committee	20,754,772	65.20	92	959,927	58.52	7	99
Patriotic Movement for National Rebirth	8,200,944	25.76	0	608,946	37.12	1	1
Confederation of Independent Poland	54,683	0.17	0			0	0
Minor opposition	108,428	0.34	0			0	0
Against all	2,714,096	8.53	–	71,533	4.36	–	–
Total	31,832,923	100.00	92	1,640,406	100.00	8	100
Total votes	17,156,170	–		1,320,816	–		
Registered voters/turnout	27,362,313	62.70		3,104,127	42.55		
Source: Sejm (first round), Sejm (second round)

==== By voivodeship ====
Voivodeship	Total seats	KO "S"	PRON
Biała Podlaska	2	2	
Białystok	2	2	
Bielsko	2	2	
Bydgoszcz	2	2	
Chełm	2	2	
Ciechanów	2	2	
Częstochowa	2	2	
Elbląg	2	2	
Gdańsk	2	2	
Gorzów	2	2	
Jelenia Góra	2	2	
Kalisz	2	2	
Katowice	3	3	
Kielce	2	2	
Konin	2	2	
Koszalin	2	2	
Kraków	2	2	
Krosno	2	2	
Legnica	2	2	
Leszno	2	2	
Lublin	2	2	
Łomża	2	2	
Łódź	2	2	
Nowy Sącz	2	2	
Olsztyn	2	2	
Opole	2	2	
Ostrołęka	2	2	
Piła	2	1	1
Piotrków	2	2	
Płock	2	2	
Poznań	2	2	
Przemyśl	2	2	
Radom	2	2	
Rzeszów	2	2	
Siedlce	2	2	
Sieradz	2	2	
Skierniewice	2	2	
Słupsk	2	2	
Suwałki	2	2	
Szczecin	2	2	
Tarnobrzeg	2	2	
Tarnów	2	2	
Toruń	2	2	
Wałbrzych	2	2	
Warsaw	3	3	
Włocławek	2	2	
Wrocław	2	2	
Zamość	2	2	
Zielona Góra	2	2	
Total	100	99	1
Source: Sejm, Sejm, Senate

== Aftermath ==
The magnitude of the Communist coalition's defeat was so great that there were initially fears that either the PZPR or the Kremlin would annul the results. However, PZPR general secretary Wojciech Jaruzelski allowed the results to stand. He and his colleagues felt secure with the 65% of the seats it was guaranteed for itself and its traditional allies. On 19 July the National Assembly, a joint session of the Sejm and the Senate, elected Jaruzelski as president by only one vote. In turn, he nominated General Czesław Kiszczak for prime minister; they intended for Solidarity to be given a few token positions for appearances. However, this was undone when Solidarity's leaders convinced the PZPR's longtime satellite parties, the ZSL and SD (some of whose members already owed a debt to Solidarity for endorsing them during the second round) to switch sides and support a Solidarity-led coalition government. The PZPR, which had 37.6% of the seats, suddenly found itself in a minority. Abandoned by Moscow, Kiszczak resigned on 14 August. With no choice but to appoint a Solidarity member as prime minister, on 24 August Jaruzelski appointed Solidarity activist Tadeusz Mazowiecki as head of a Solidarity-led coalition, ushering a brief period of cohabitation described as "Your president, our prime minister".

The elected parliament was known as the Contract Sejm, from the "contract" between the Solidarity and the communist government which made it possible in the first place.

Although the elections were not entirely democratic due to the reserved seats, they paved the way for the Sejm's approval of Mazowiecki's cabinet on 13 September and a peaceful transition to democracy, which was confirmed after the presidential election of 1990 (in which Lech Wałęsa replaced Jaruzelski as president) and the parliamentary elections of 1991.

On the international level, this election is seen as one of the major milestones in the fall of communism ("Autumn of Nations") in Central and Eastern Europe.

However, Solidarity did not stay in power long, and quickly fractured, resulting in it being replaced by other parties. In this context, the 1989 elections are often seen as the vote against communism, rather than for Solidarity.

== See also ==
- History of Poland (1945–1989)
- History of Solidarity
- Thick line
- Balcerowicz plan
