= Kozakiewicz =

Kozakiewicz is a Polish surname. Notable people with the surname include:

- Andrzej Kozakiewicz (born 1966), Polish musician
- Mikołaj Kozakiewicz (1923–1998), Polish politician
- Władysław Kozakiewicz (born 1953), Polish pole vault jumper
  - Kozakiewicz's gesture, alternative name for bras d'honneur
