= 1969 Polish parliamentary election =

Parliamentary election in communist Poland

- 1 June 1969

All 460 seats in the Sejm
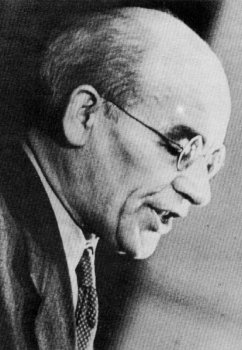

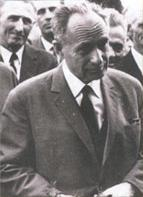

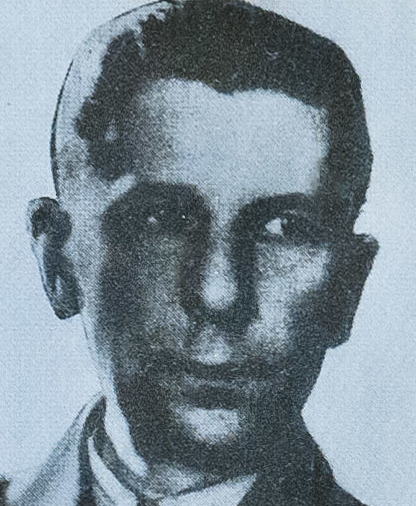
	Majority party	Minority party	Third party
Leader	Władysław Gomułka	Czesław Wycech	Stanisław Kulczyński
Party	PZPR	ZSL	SD
Last election	255 seats	117 seats	39
Seats won	255	117	39
Seat change	Steady	Steady	Steady

Parliamentary elections were held in Poland on 1 June 1969. The results, like with the other elections in communist Poland, were controlled by the communist government. The results of the 1969 election were identical to the 1965 elections and were repeated in 1972.

== Results ==
Party or alliance		Votes	%	Seats	+/–
Front of National Unity	Polish United Workers' Party	20,473,114	99.22	255	0
Front of National Unity	United People's Party	20,473,114	99.22	117	0
Front of National Unity	Democratic Party	20,473,114	99.22	39	0
Front of National Unity	Independents	20,473,114	99.22	49	0
Blank ballots		161,569	0.78	–	–
Total		20,634,683	100.00	460	0
Valid votes		20,634,683	99.96		
Invalid votes		7,766	0.04		
Total votes		20,642,449	100.00		
Registered voters/turnout		21,148,879	97.61		
Source: Nohlen & Stöver

As the other parties and "independents" were subordinate to PZPR, its control of the Sejm was total.
