= National electoral list =

List of 35 candidates for the Sejm of the Polish People's Republic

The national electoral list (commonly referred to as the national list) was a national list comprising 35 candidates for the Sejm of the Polish People's Republic's 10th term during the first round of 1989 Polish parliamentary election. It included representatives from the highest state and party authorities associated with the Polish United Workers' Party and its satellite groups, as well as social organizations controlled by the party.

In the voting held on 4 June 1989, only two candidates from the list secured parliamentary mandates. The defeat of the remaining candidates – among them Prime Minister Mieczysław Rakowski, members of the Politburo of the Polish United Workers' Party, and key figures like Ministers Czesław Kiszczak and Florian Siwicki, as well as leaders of the Alliance of Democrats and the United People's Party – resulted in most ruling bloc leaders being excluded from parliament. This outcome was widely regarded as a significant and symbolic defeat for the ruling regime.

== Creation of the national electoral list ==
The Polish Round Table Agreement between the ruling communists and the Solidarity opposition provided for partially free elections to the Sejm of the Polish People's Republic. 65% of the seats were reserved for the signatories of the Patriotic Movement for National Rebirth (representatives of the Polish United Workers' Party, the United People's Party, the Alliance of Democrats, the PAX Association, the Christian-Social Union, and the Polish Catholic-Social Union). The remaining 35% of seats were open to independent candidates.

10% of the 460 seats were to be allocated from the national list, designed primarily to ensure seamless election of party leaders to the Sejm. Solidarity leaders were offered 11 slots on this list, but the opposition declined, perceiving it as a deceptive attempt by the Polish United Workers' Party to blur the distinctions between the government and Solidarity factions.

On 7 April 1989, the Sejm, in line with the Round Table agreements, adopted a new electoral law. The legislation stipulated that no more than 10% of seats could be allocated via the national list. The State Council, exercising its authority, set this number at 35 seats. The electoral law allowed only the agreement of the top authorities of the Polish United Workers' Party, United People's Party, Alliance of Democrats, PAX Association, Christian-Social Union, Polish Catholic-Social Union, and Patriotic Movement for National Rebirth to submit the national list.

The list was required to include candidates in alphabetical order, matching the total number of seats designated for the list. Candidates needed to receive more than half of the valid votes to secure a seat. A vote for a candidate was cast by not crossing out their name on the national list. Consequently, leaving the separate ballot with these candidates unmarked meant an automatic vote for all listed individuals. However, the electoral law did not specify any procedures for filling unallocated seats if some candidates failed to secure enough votes in the first round. This oversight reflected the complete lack of anticipation by Wojciech Jaruzelski's regime of the national list's potential failure.

The National Electoral Commission announced the national electoral list on 12 May 1989, presenting the candidates as representatives of a broad spectrum of political, social, cultural, local government, and academic groups. In reality, all nominees were closely tied to the ruling bloc. For example, former Polish United Workers' Party First Secretary Stanisław Kania was introduced as a local government activist, and Kazimierz Barcikowski, Deputy Chairman of the State Council and former Deputy Prime Minister, as a representative of cooperative groups.

Notably, Polish United Workers' Party First Secretary and Chairman of the State Council Wojciech Jaruzelski was not among the candidates, as he was slated to assume the newly created office of President of the Polish People's Republic following the elections. The list, however, included other communist party leaders, United People's Party and Alliance of Democrats heads, leaders of sanctioned Christian, women's, and union organizations, as well as several academics and artists supportive of the ruling bloc.

== Electoral campaign and voting ==
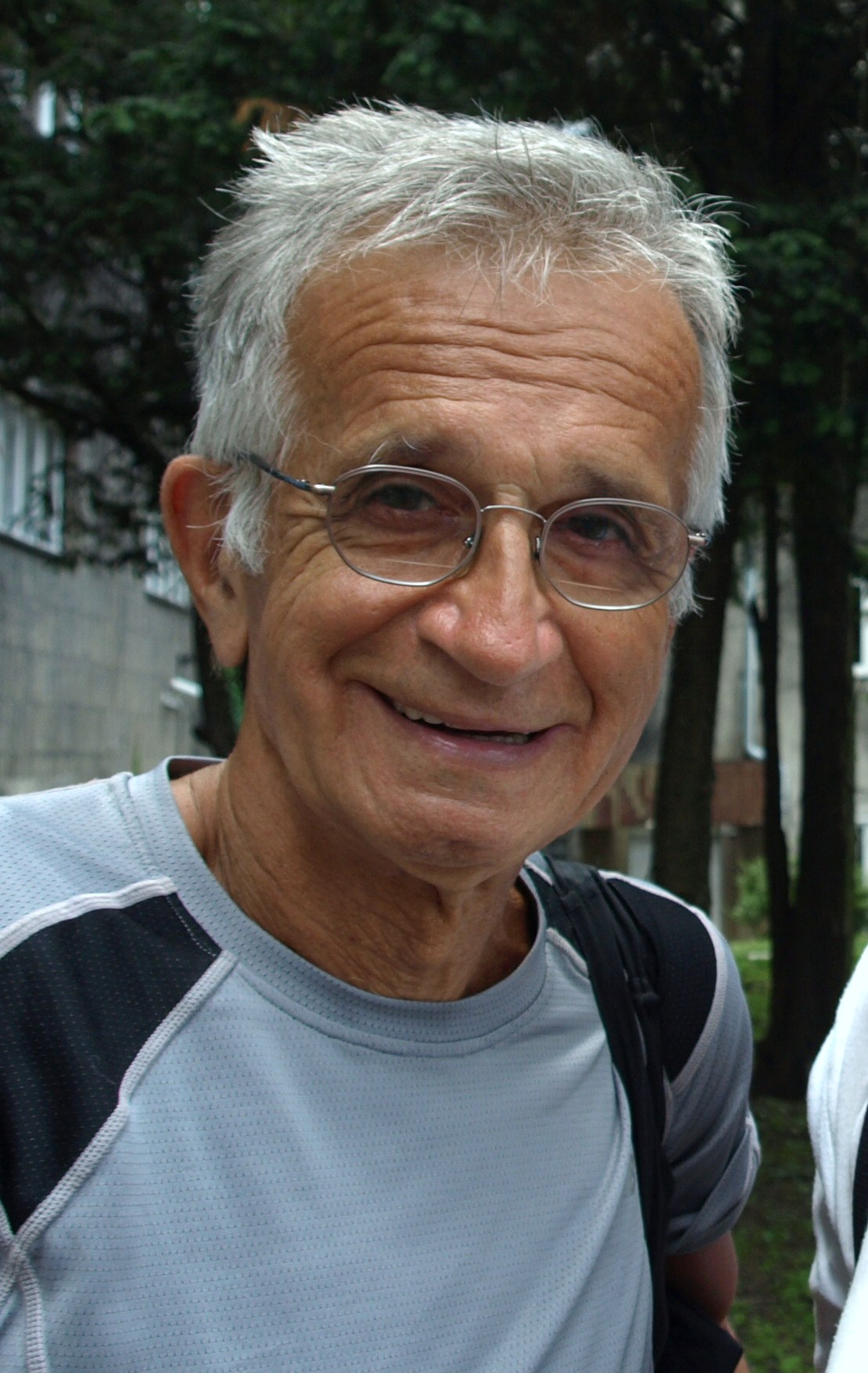
Jacek Fedorowicz hosted the Electoral Studio of the Solidarity Citizens' Committee, informally instructing viewers on how to cross out candidates from the national electoral list

The Solidarity Citizens' Committee did not conduct an official campaign against the government candidates. However, voting against them, especially against the national list, was considered a vote of no confidence in the leadership of the Polish People's Republic. Flyers and posters began to appear on the streets, providing instructions on how to cast a vote against the coalition activists. Information on this was provided by Bohdan Tomaszewski on the radio's Studio Solidarity, and Jacek Fedorowicz in the television Studio Solidarity, particularly highlighting the need to cross out each name separately rather than marking a single "X" for the entire list. There were doubts regarding the legitimacy of crossing out the entire list with one mark. On 15 May 1989, the Solidarity-affiliated Gazeta Wyborcza highlighted the potential benefits of the failure of the national list candidates. In the article Zyskać więcej (Gain More), the author noted that if these seats were left unfilled, the number of non-party (citizen) deputies could be proportionally higher.

In response to these actions, the government side began criticizing the opposition's campaign, accusing them of explicitly calling for the crossing out of government candidates, especially from the national list. This issue was directly addressed at a meeting of the Consultative Commission on 19 May 1989.

In the election on 4 June 1989, only two out of the 35 candidates marginally exceeded the 50% threshold and secured seats. These were Professor Mikołaj Kozakiewicz (United People's Party, 50.85%, 8.671 million votes) and Professor Adam Zieliński (Polish United Workers' Party, 50.66%, 8.639 million votes). The remaining candidates received between 40.03% and 49.98% of the votes, with the lowest result being 38.76% for Kazimierz Barcikowski. The selection of the two representatives was sometimes explained (e.g., by Anatol Lawina) by the specific placement of their names on the electoral list and the inaccurate cross-outs made by voters.

== Solution to the unfilled seats issue ==
The election of 4 June 1989 brought a decisive victory for the Solidarity opposition, which, in the first round, won 160 out of the 161 seats allocated to non-party candidates in the Sejm. In contrast, the ruling coalition secured only 3 seats out of 264, and these were unofficially supported by Solidarity. The collapse of the national electoral list was considered the most painful and prestigious defeat for the ruling camp, as it resulted in the majority of the communist leadership being excluded from parliament.

On 8 June 1989, another meeting of the Consultative Commission was held, during which Czesław Kiszczak criticized Lech Wałęsa for the campaign calling for the crossing out of non-Solidarity candidates, which the government side viewed as a violation of the agreements made at the Round Table talks. A proposal was made to annul the vote for the national list and to hold a re-vote in the second round. Adam Michnik opposed this solution. Ultimately, it was agreed that the government would ask the State Council to legally enable the filling of the remaining 33 seats. On 12 June 1989, the State Council issued a decree amending the electoral law and a resolution, which redistributed these seats among the existing electoral districts (creating new mandates numbered from 426 to 458) and allocated them exclusively to the Patriotic Movement for National Rebirth coalition members. This solution was controversial because it involved changing the rules of the election mid-process, which caused dissatisfaction among some Solidarity activists. Supporters of the compromise pointed to the need to demonstrate goodwill toward the other side and a desire to remain in the opposition. It was also argued that such a stance would deprive the communists of an excuse to annul the elections.

The additional 33 mandates were filled in the second round of voting on 18 June 1989. None of the 33 candidates who had lost in the first round chose to run again.

== List of candidates for the national electoral list and voting results ==
Bold names indicate candidates elected to the Sejm.

No.	Candidate	Party	Background	Votes	%
1.	Władysław Baka	Polish United Workers' Party	Professor of economics, member of the Political Bureau of the Central Committee of the Polish United Workers' Party, secretary of the Central Committee of the Polish United Workers' Party	7,904,212	46.35
2.	Kazimierz Barcikowski	Polish United Workers' Party	Member of the Political Bureau of the Central Committee of the Polish United Workers' Party, deputy chairman of the State Council, chairman of the Supreme Cooperative Council, MP in the People's Sejm	6,609,079	38.76
3.	Stanisław Ciosek	Polish United Workers' Party	Member of the Political Bureau of the Central Committee of the Polish United Workers' Party, secretary of the Polish United Workers' Party Central Committee, general secretary of the national council of the Patriotic Movement for National Rebirth	7,159,491	41.98
4.	Józef Czyrek	Polish United Workers' Party	Member of the Political Bureau of the Central Committee of the Polish United Workers' Party, secretary of the Polish United Workers' Party Central Committee, vice-chairman of the national council of Patriotic Movement for National Rebirth, MP in the People's Sejm	6,826,957	40.03
5.	Wiesław Gwiżdż	Polish Catholic-Social Association	President of the Polish Catholic-Social Association, MP in the People's Sejm	8,029,911	47.09
6.	Mieczysław Jakubowski	Alliance of Democrats	Vice-chairman of the Alliance of Democrats Central Committee	8,228,163	48.25
7.	Jerzy Jóźwiak	Alliance of Democrats	Chairman of the Alliance of Democrats Central Committee	8,321,536	48.80
8.	Marek Kabat	PAX Association	Secretary of the National Board of the PAX Association, MP in the People's Sejm	8,187,074	48.01
9.	Jan Kaczmarek	Polish United Workers' Party	Professor of technical sciences, president of the Polish Federation of Engineering Associations, MP in the People's Sejm (Polish United Workers' Party)	8,375,163	49.11
10.	Stanisław Kania	Polish United Workers' Party	Former First Secretary of the Polish United Workers' Party Central Committee, MP in the People's Sejm	6,877,825	40.33
11.	Jerzy Kawalerowicz	Polish United Workers' Party	Film director, artistic director of the Polish Film Producers' Teams, MP in the People's Sejm (Polish United Workers' Party)	8,405,334	49.29
12.	Czesław Kiszczak	Polish United Workers' Party	Member of the Political Bureau of the Central Committee of the Polish United Workers' Party, Minister of the Interior, MP in the People's Sejm; later nominated as Prime Minister after the 1989 elections, but rejected by the Sejm	7,666,698	44.96
13.	Zenon Komender	PAX Association	Chairman of the National Board of the PAX Association, deputy chairman of the State Council, MP in the People's Sejm	7,820,484	45.86
14.	Zofia Kowalczyk	United People's Party	Independent farmer, member of the United People's Party National Council	8,291,410	48.62
15.	**Mikołaj Kozakiewicz**	United People's Party	Professor of humanities, member of the United People's Party National Council, MP in the People's Sejm	8,671,395	50.85
16.	Bogdan Królewski	United People's Party	Secretary of the United People's Party National Council, MP in the People's Sejm	8,270,709	48.50
17.	Wiktor Marek Leyk	Christian-Social Union	Vice-president of the Christian-Social Union, MP in the People's Sejm	8,168,899	47.90
18.	Elżbieta Lęcznarowicz	Polish United Workers' Party	Chairwoman of the Polish Women's League	8,500,772	49.85
19.	Dominik Ludwiczak	United People's Party	Vice-president of the United People's Party National Council, MP in the People's Sejm	8,441,691	49.50
20.	Jarema Maciszewski	Polish United Workers' Party	Professor of humanities, rector of the Academy of Social Sciences, MP in the People's Sejm (Polish United Workers' Party)	8,237,584	48.31
21.	Janusz Maksymiuk	Polish United Workers' Party	Chairman of the main council of the National Association of Farmers, Peasant Circles and Agricultural Organizations, member of the Polish United Workers' Party	8,344,736	48.93
22.	Roman Malinowski	United People's Party	President of the United People's Party National Council, Marshal of the People's Sejm	7,921,072	46.45
23.	Jan Mieloch	PAX Association	Director of United Economic Teams, MP in the People's Sejm (PAX)	8,262,203	48.45
24.	Alfred Miodowicz	Polish United Workers' Party	Member of the Political Bureau of the Central Committee of the Polish United Workers' Party, member of the State Council, chairman of the All-Poland Alliance of Trade Unions, MP in the People's Sejm	7,171,454	42.05
25.	Kazimierz Morawski	Christian-Social Union	President of the Christian-Social Union National Board, MP in the People's Sejm	8,432,997	49.45
26.	Kazimierz Olesiak	United People's Party	Member of the United People's Party National Council, deputy prime minister, minister of agriculture, forestry and food economy, MP in the People's Sejm	8,522,579	49.98
27.	Mieczysław Rakowski	Polish United Workers' Party	Member of the Political Bureau of the Central Committee of the Polish United Workers' Party, Prime Minister, MP in the People's Sejm	8,213,671	48.17
28.	Florian Siwicki	Polish United Workers' Party	Member of the Political Bureau of the Central Committee of the Polish United Workers' Party, Minister of National Defense, MP in the People's Sejm	7,539,053	44.21
29.	Józef Szawiec	Alliance of Democrats	Secretary of the Alliance of Democrats Central Committee, MP in the People's Sejm	8,265,204	48.47
30.	Tadeusz Szelachowski	United People's Party	Vice-president of the United People's Party National Council, deputy chairman of the State Council, MP in the People's Sejm	8,175,870	47.94
31.	Szymon Szurmiej	Polish United Workers' Party	Theater director, MP in the People's Sejm (Polish United Workers' Party)	8,186,501	48.01
32.	Edward Szymański	Polish United Workers' Party	Secretary of the Commission for Representative Bodies in the Polish United Workers' Party Central Committee, MP in the People's Sejm	8,187,022	48.01
33.	Władysław Szymański	United People's Party	Professor of economics, member of the State Council, MP in the People's Sejm (United People's Party)	8,291,751	48.62
34.	Stanisław Śliwiński	United People's Party	Secretary of the United People's Party National Council	8,334,753	48.88
35.	**Adam Zieliński**	Polish United Workers' Party	Professor of law, President of the Supreme Administrative Court, member of the Polish United Workers' Party	8,639,833	50.66

== Bibliography ==
- Hall, Aleksander (2011). Osobista historia III Rzeczypospolitej [Personal History of the Third Republic of Poland] (in Polish). Warsaw: Rosner i Wspólnicy. ISBN 978-83-60336-42-7.
