= 1965 Polish parliamentary election =

← 1961	30 June 1965	1969 →

All 460 seats in the Sejm
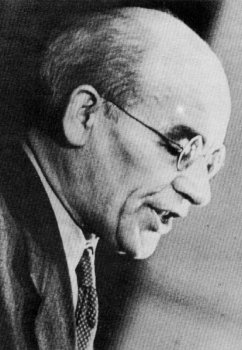
	First party
Leader	Władysław Gomułka
Party	PZPR
Alliance	FJN
Seats won	460
Seat change	Steady
Premier before election
Józef Cyrankiewicz
PZPR
New Premier
Józef Cyrankiewicz
PZPR

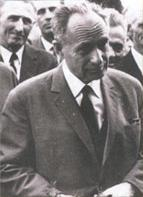
Czesław Wycech, leader of puppet United People's Party

Parliamentary elections were held in Poland on 30 May 1965. They were the fourth elections to the Sejm of the People's Republic of Poland, and fifth in Communist Poland. They took place on 30 May. The lists admitted were controlled by the Front of National Unity (FJN), in turn controlled by the Polish United Workers' Party (PZPR).

The distribution of seats was decided before the elections by the FJN, with voters having no possibility to change it. The results of the 1965 election would be exactly duplicated by the 1969 and 1972 elections.

== Results ==
Of the 49 independents, five were affiliated with Znak, five with the PAX Association and three with the Christian Social Association. As the other parties and "independents" were subordinate to PZPR, its control of the Sejm was total.

Party or alliance		Votes	%	Seats	+/–
Front of National Unity	Polish United Workers' Party	18,742,152	98.81	255	–1
Front of National Unity	United People's Party	18,742,152	98.81	117	0
Front of National Unity	Democratic Party	18,742,152	98.81	39	0
Front of National Unity	Independents	18,742,152	98.81	49	+1
Blank ballots		226,324	1.19	–	–
Total		18,968,476	100.00	460	0
Valid votes		18,968,476	99.93		
Invalid votes		13,840	0.07		
Total votes		18,982,316	100.00		
Registered voters/turnout		19,645,803	96.62		
Source: Nohlen & Stöver
