= Polish–Soviet Friendship Society =

- Towarzystwo Przyjaźni Polsko-Radzieckiej
- Abbreviation: TPPR
- Predecessor: Koła Przyjaźni Polsko-Radzieckiej
- Successor: Stowarzyszenie Polska–Rosja
- Formation: 22 November 1944; 81 years ago
- Founded at: Lublin, Poland
- Purpose: Cultural exchange and solidarity
- Headquarters: Śródmieście, Warsaw
- First President: Józef Wasowski
- Last President: Henryk Bednarski
- Publication: Przyjaźń

The Polish–Soviet Friendship Society (Polish: Towarzystwo Przyjaźni Polsko-Radzieckiej) was a Polish organisation founded in 1944. It was a vehicle for organized propaganda, like the celebration of anniversaries of the October Revolution, trips to the Soviet Union, exchange programs, promotion of Soviet culture, technology, books or movies as well as festivals of Soviet songs for amateurs.

Up until the 1980s it had over 3 million members, mainly through pressuring students and government employees to enlist. In 1991, after the fall of the Soviet Union, the organisation was renamed to Stowarzyszenie Polska–Rosja (Polish-Russian Association).

== Presidents of the TPPR ==
- 1944–1945 Józef Wasowski
- 1945–1950 Henryk Świątkowski
- 1950–1952 Edward Ochab
- 1952–1955 Józef Cyrankiewicz
- 1955–1957 Stefan Ignar
- 1957–1974 Czesław Wycech
- 1974–1980 Jan Szydlak
- 1980–1987 Stanisław Wroński
- 1987–1991 Henryk Bednarski

In 1983, a committee on the 'brotherhood of arms' between the People's Republic of Poland and the Soviet Union was founded. The first head of this committee was Jan Śliwiński, replaced in 1987 by former NKVD agent Jan Raczkowski.

The TPPR issued a magazine called Przyjaźń (transl. Friendship).

== See also ==
- Society for German–Soviet Friendship
