= Mikołaj Kozakiewicz =

Polish politician, publicist, and sociologist

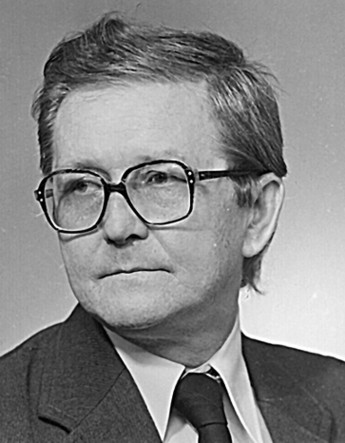
Mikołaj Kozakiewicz (1923 – 1998) - Polish politician, publicist and sociologist.

Mikołaj Kozakiewicz (24 December 1923 – 22 November 1998) was a Polish politician, publicist and sociologist.

Kozakiewicz was born in Slonim, Belarus. He was a member of the United People's Party and deputy in the last communist Sejm (1985–1989). He was a member of the Polish Round Table Agreement on the government side. Later he joined the Polish People's Party and Partia Ludowo-Demokratyczna, and was a member of the Sejms (1989–1991, 1991–1993). He was Marshal of the Sejm in the Contract Sejm (10th and the last communist Sejm), from 23 June 1989 to 24 November 1991.

Kozakiewicz was also a professor and author of many articles and books, mostly in the realm of sociology. An activist in many non-governmental organizations, he supported the homosexual rights movement and legalization of soft drugs.
