= Przybysławice, Tarnów County =

Przybysławice
- Village
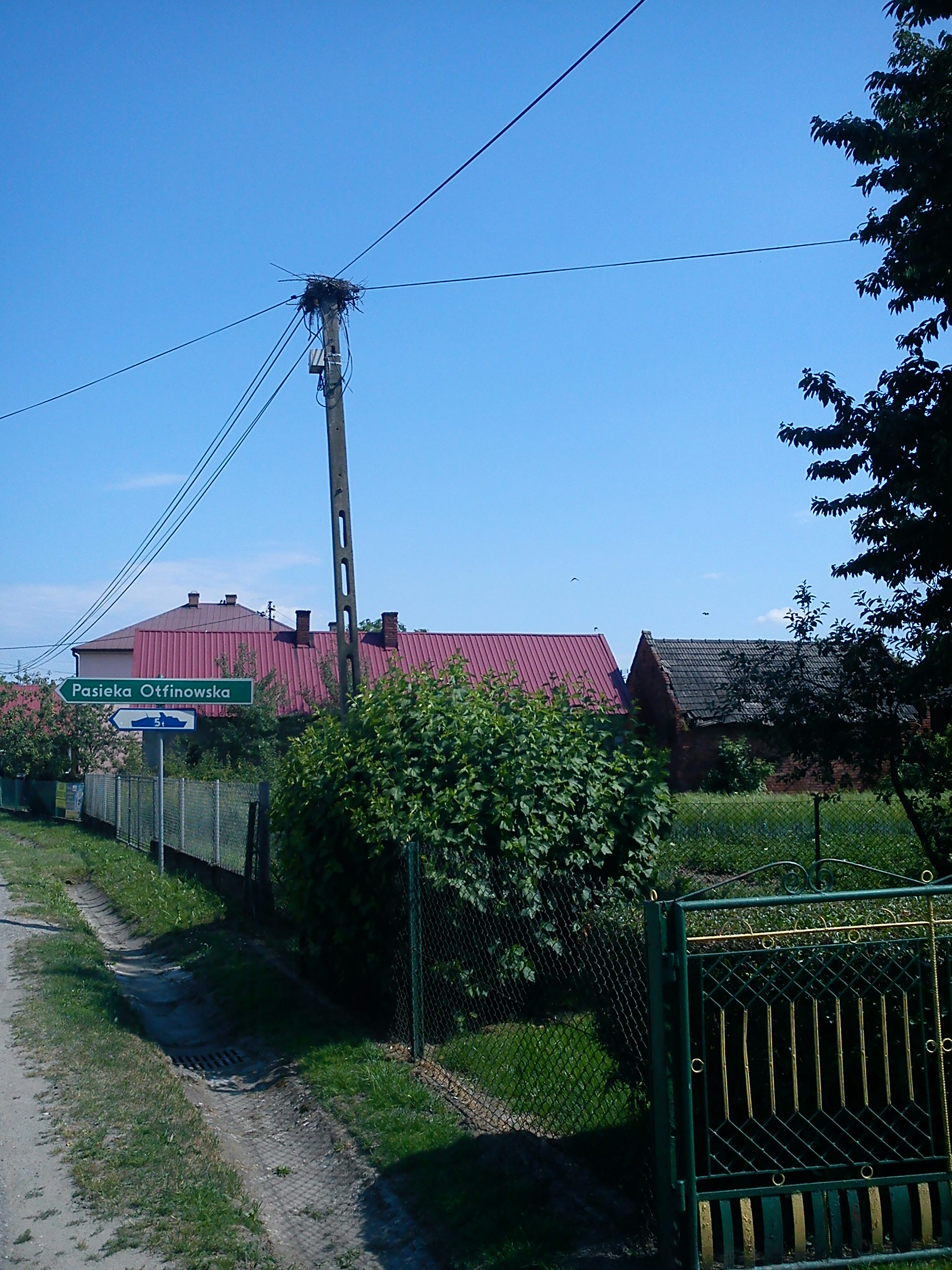

- Location within Poland
- Coordinates: 50°9′N 20°48′E
- Country: Poland
- Voivodeship: Lesser Poland
- County: Tarnów
- Gmina: Radłów

Przybysławice [pʂɨbɨswaˈvit͡sɛ] is a village in the administrative district of Gmina Radłów, within Tarnów County, Lesser Poland Voivodeship, in southern Poland.

The name Przybysławice appears in records dating back 300 years and is said to come from the name Prybystaw. This was a medieval knight who, as a reward for his war efforts, received land and forest estates on which he built his house.

== History ==
Przybysławice suffered personal and property damage during World War I, due to its proximity to the Dunajec, a strategic waterway used by German, Russian and Austrian troops. Later, during World War II, the village became an important part of Operation Most III, in which the Polish underground smuggled a German V-2 rocket through Przybysławice and on to England.

On July 22, 1927, the Przybysławice Club was formed in Chicago which helped to gather emigrants from the village. The committee's activities began with organizing material assistance for the Fire Department in Przybystawice. As of July 2025, the club is still active, providing financial support to the school, church, and parish in Przybysławice.

== Awards ==
The village of Przybysławice was awarded a Gold Medal of Merit for National Defense in 1992 by the Minister of National Defense of Poland for the actions and participation of the inhabitants of the village in Operation Most III.
