= Stanisław Gucwa =

Polish politician and economist (1919–1994)

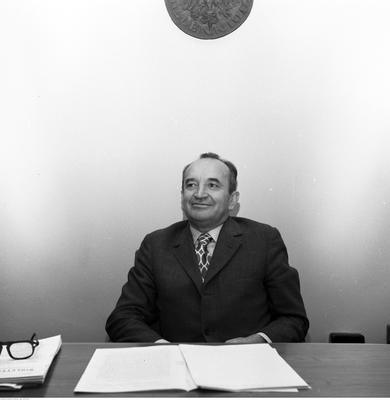
- Portrait of Gucwa by Grażyna Rutowska, 1972. From the collections of the NAC

5th Marshal of the Communist Sejm
- In office 28 March 1972 – 31 August 1985

Personal details
- Born: 18 April 1919 Przybysławice, Poland
- Died: 14 August 1994 (aged 75) Warsaw, Poland
- Party: United People's Party

Stanisław Jan Gucwa (18 April 1919 – 14 August 1994) was a Polish politician and economist. He was the Marshal of the Sejm from 1972 until 1985.

== Biography ==
Gucwa was born in Przybysławice. During World War II, he participated in the Polish resistance movement under the pseudonyms Golec and Socha.

In 1949, he joined the United People's Party. He was a member of the Sejm from 1961 until 1989 and the Marshal of the Sejm from 1972 until 1985.

In 1974, Gucwa received the Order of the Builders of People's Poland. He also received the Order of the Banner of Labour First Class and the Order of Polonia Restituta Third Class.
