= 1972 Polish parliamentary election =

- 19 March 1972

All 460 seats in the Sejm
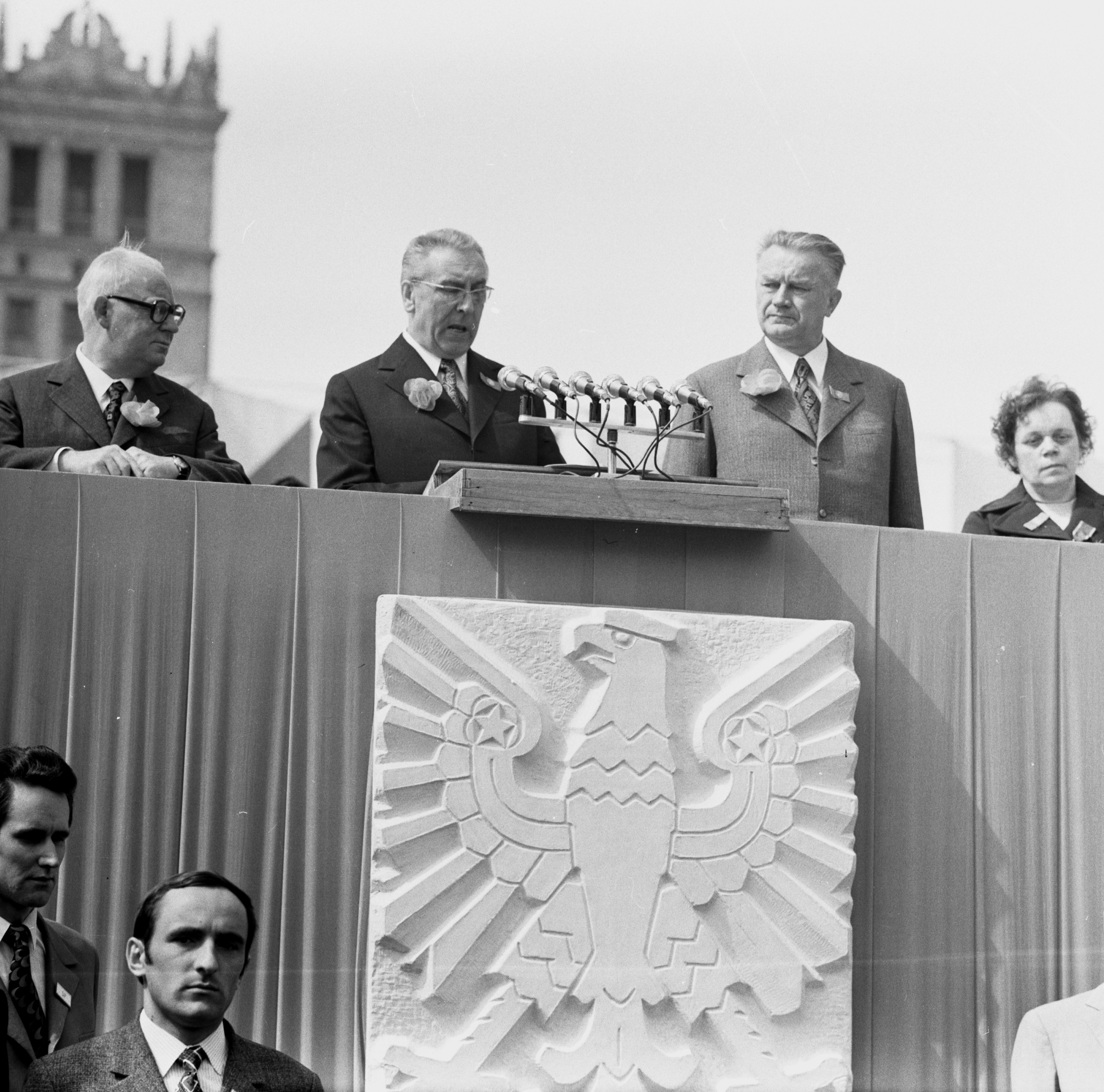

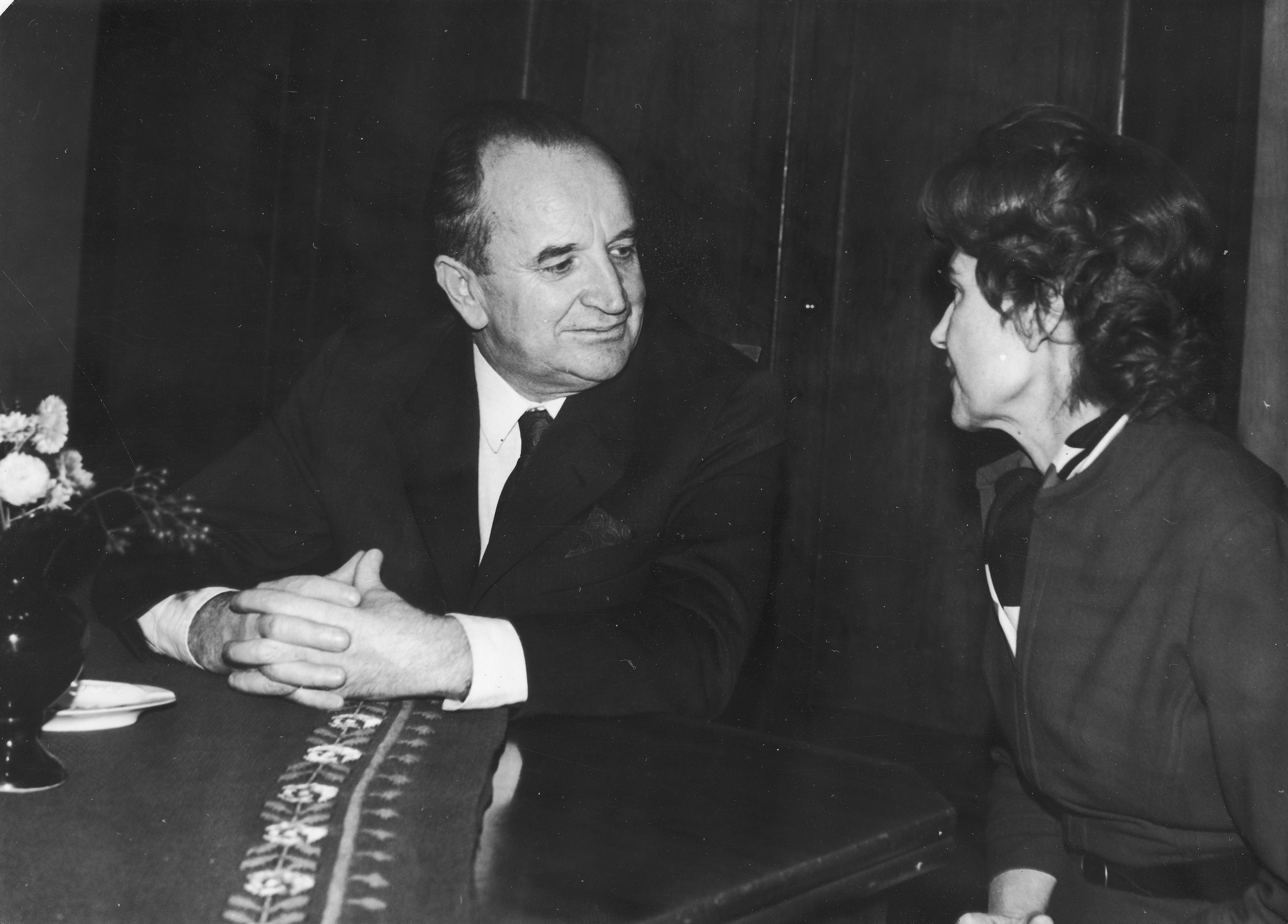

	Majority party	Minority party	Third party
Leader	Edward Gierek	Stanisław Gucwa	Zygmunt Moskwa
Party	PZPR	ZSL	SD
Last election	255 seats	117 seats	39
Seats won	255	117	39
Seat change	0	0	0

Parliamentary elections were held in Poland on 19 March 1972. The results, like with the other elections in communist Poland, were controlled by the communist government. The results of the 1965 election would be duplicated, exactly, by the 1969 and 1972 elections. The results of the next, 1976 election, would be only marginally different.

== Results ==
Party or alliance		Votes	%	Seats	+/–
Front of National Unity	Polish United Workers' Party	21,746,242	99.53	255	0
Front of National Unity	United People's Party	21,746,242	99.53	117	0
Front of National Unity	Democratic Party	21,746,242	99.53	39	0
Front of National Unity	Independents	21,746,242	99.53	49	0
Blank ballots		103,155	0.47	–	–
Total		21,849,397	100.00	460	0
Valid votes		21,849,397	99.98		
Invalid votes		5,084	0.02		
Total votes		21,854,481	100.00		
Registered voters/turnout		22,313,851	97.94		
Source: Nohlen & Stöver

As the other parties and "independents" were subordinate to PZPR, its control of the Sejm was total.
