= Roman Malinowski =

Polish politician and economist (1935–2021)

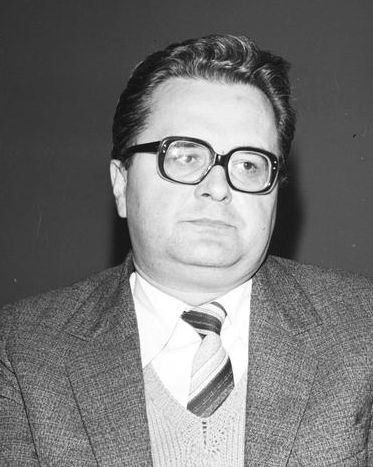
Malinowski in 1985

Roman Malinowski (26 February 1935 – 31 August 2021) was a Polish politician and economist. He served as Deputy Prime Minister from 1980 to 1985, Chairman of United People's Party from 1981 to 1989, and Marshal of the Sejm from 1985 to 1989.

Malinowski was a co-founder of the first non-communist government in Poland.

== Biography ==
Roman Malinowski was born in Białystok, Poland 26 February 1935.He graduated from SGH Warsaw School of Economics in 1956.

He was a member of Union of Polish Youth from 1948 to 1956. Malinowski became a member of the pro-communist United People's Party in 1956. He served as a member of the Sejm of the 7th, 8th and 9th terms (1976–1989). Malinowski was chairman of the party from 1981 to 1989.

Malinowski was Deputy Prime Minister from 1980 to 1985 and Minister of Food Industry from April to October 1980. In 1985 Malinowski was nominated as the Marshal of the Sejm. He was also a member of Patriotic Movement for National Rebirth.

After the Round Table Agreement Malinowski became a supporter of the cooperation with the democratic opposition. With Lech Wałęsa of Solidarity and Jerzy Jóźwiak of Alliance of Democrats, Malinowski was a co-founder of Mazowiecki cabinet, the first democratic government in post-war Poland. As a result of the transformation of United People's Party, he became a member of Polish People's Party 'Rebirth', and then of recreated Polish People's Party.

Malinowski was also active in the Lech Wałęsa Institute.

Malinowski died in Jabłonna, Poland 31 August 2021. He was buried with state honors. The funeral was attended by Polish People's Party leaders and the family received a letter of condolence from the Marshal of the Sejm, Elżbeta Witek.

== Personal life ==
Roman Malinowski was married to Mirona. He was a member of the Polish-Soviet Friendship Society and the chairman of the Social Committee for the Construction of the Monument to Wincenty Witos in Warsaw, which was unveiled in 1985.
