= United People's Party (Poland) =

United People's Party Zjednoczone Stronnictwo Ludowe
- Abbreviation: ZSL
- First leader: Józef Niećko
- Last leader: Dominik Ludwiczak
- Founded: 27 November 1949
- Dissolved: 27–29 November 1989
- Merger of: Polish People's Party; Polish People's Party "Nowe Wyzwolenie"; People's Party
- Succeeded by: Polish People's Party
- Headquarters: Grzybowska 4, 00-131 Warsaw
- Membership (1989): 300,000
- Ideology: Agrarian socialism
- Political position: Left-wing
- Colors: Green

The United People's Party (Polish: Zjednoczone Stronnictwo Ludowe, ZSL) was an agrarian socialist political party in the People's Republic of Poland. It was formed on 27 November 1949 from the merger of the pro-Communist Stronnictwo Ludowe party with remnants of the independent Polish People's Party of Stanisław Mikołajczyk.

ZSL became – as intended from its beginning – a satellite party of the Polish United Workers' Party (PZPR), representing the PZPR in the rural areas. It was a member of the Front of National Unity until 1982, and from 1982 it was a member of the Front's successor, the Patriotic Movement for National Rebirth. To keep up the appearance that Poland was ruled by a coalition, the Marshal of the Sejm (parliamentary speaker) was always a member of the ZSL.

After victory of the Solidarity trade union in the 1989 Polish legislative elections, together with the PZPR's other satellite party, the Alliance of Democrats, ZSL decided to support Solidarity. At the 27–29 November 1989 ZSL congress, ZSL became the Polskie Stronnictwo Ludowe - Odrodzenie ("Polish People's Party - Rebirth"). PSL-Odrodzenie merged with Polish People's Party "Wilanowskie", forming today's Polish People's Party.

== Chairmen ==
- 1949–1953: Józef Niećko
- 1953–1956: Władysław Kowalski
- 1956–1962: Stefan Ignar
- 1962–1971: Czesław Wycech
- 1971–1981: Stanisław Gucwa
- 1981: Stefan Ignar
- 1981–1989: Roman Malinowski
- 1989: Dominik Ludwiczak

== Electoral history ==
=== Sejm elections ===
Election	Party leader	Votes	%	Seats	+/–	Position
1952	Józef Niećko	as part of FJN - PZPR		90 / 425	▲90	▲2nd
1957	Stefan Ignar	as part of FJN - PZPR		118 / 459	▲28	2nd
1961	Stefan Ignar	as part of FJN - PZPR		117 / 460	▼1	2nd
1965	Czesław Wycech	as part of FJN - PZPR		117 / 460	Steady	2nd
1969	Czesław Wycech	as part of FJN - PZPR		117 / 460	Steady	2nd
1972	Stanisław Gucwa	as part of FJN - PZPR		117 / 460	Steady	2nd
1976	Stanisław Gucwa	as part of FJN - PZPR		113 / 460	▼4	2nd
1980	Stanisław Gucwa	as part of FJN - PZPR		113 / 460	Steady	2nd
1985	Roman Malinowski	as part of PRON		106 / 460	▼7	2nd
1989	Roman Malinowski	8,865,102 (constituencies) (Note: The electoral law for the 1989 election reserved constituency seats for each of the PRON's individual member parties separately, and for independent and opposition party candidates as a whole; ZSL candidates could only run in the seats reserved for ZSL. This number of votes reflects the total number of votes cast in ZSL's reserved seats.)	N/A	76 / 460	▼41	▼3rd
1989	Roman Malinowski	74,921,230 (in the national list) (Note: The electoral law for the 1989 election provided for a national list of prominent PRON figures; voters voted on approving or rejecting each candidate on the national list separately. Of the 35 national list candidates, 9 were nominated by ZSL.)	48.82% (Note: 17,053,171 votes were cast in the election of National list members; since voters voted on each candidate separately, and there were 9 ZSL candidates on the national list, 153,478,539 marks the maximum number of approval votes ZSL's national list candidates could have received.)	76 / 460	▼41	▼3rd
