= Czesław Wycech =

Polish activist, politician, and historian

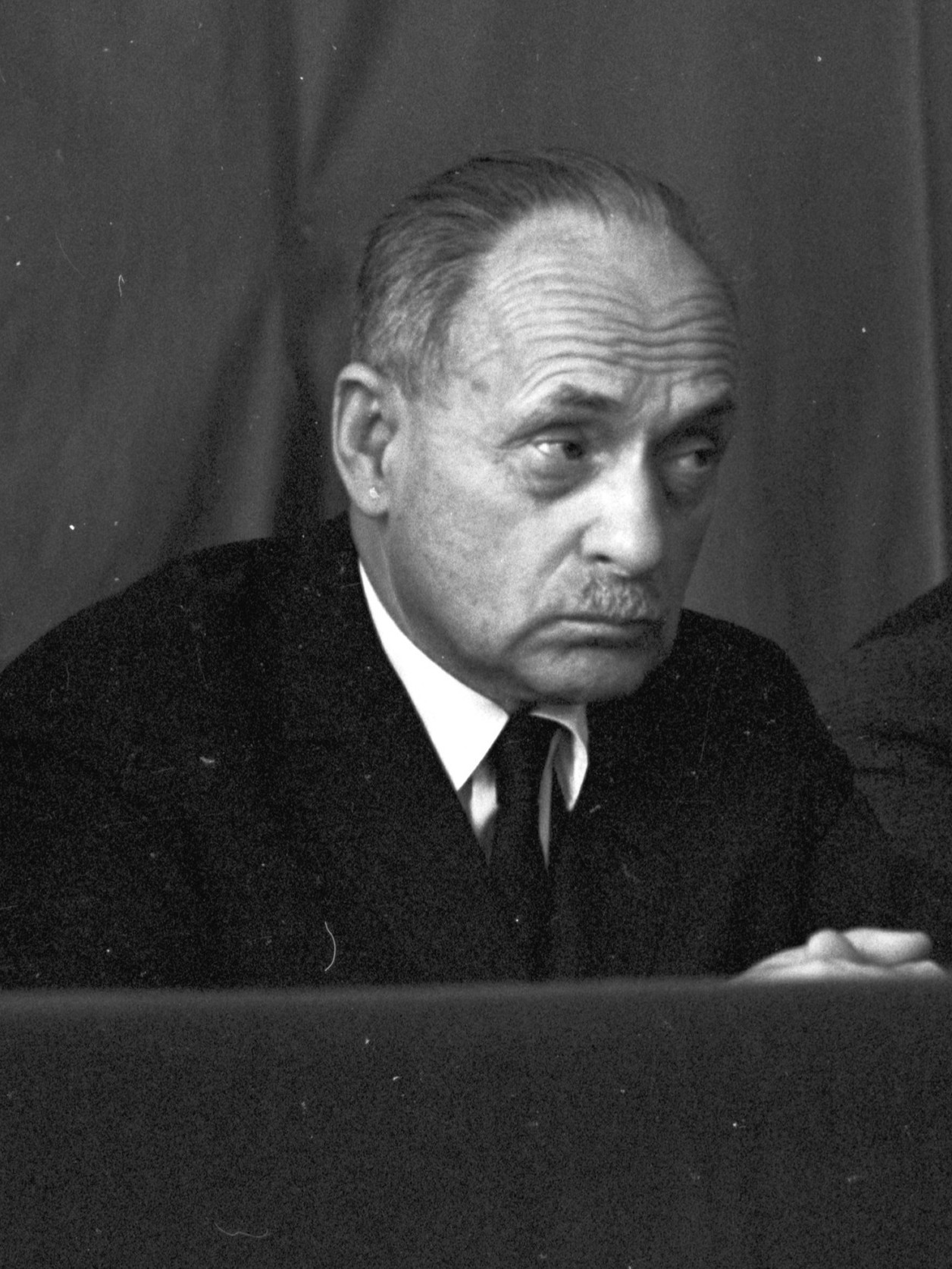
- Wycech in 1970

Vice chairman of the Polish State Council
- In office 13 November 1956 – 20 February 1957

Marshal of the Sejm of the Polish People's Republic
- In office 20 February 1957 – 11 February 1971
- Preceded by: Jan Dembowski
- Succeeded by: Dyzma Gałaj

Personal details
- Born: 20 July 1899 Wilczogęby, Congress Poland
- Died: 26 May 1977 (aged 77) Warsaw, Poland
- Resting place: Powązki Military Cemetery
- Party: Polish United Workers' Party

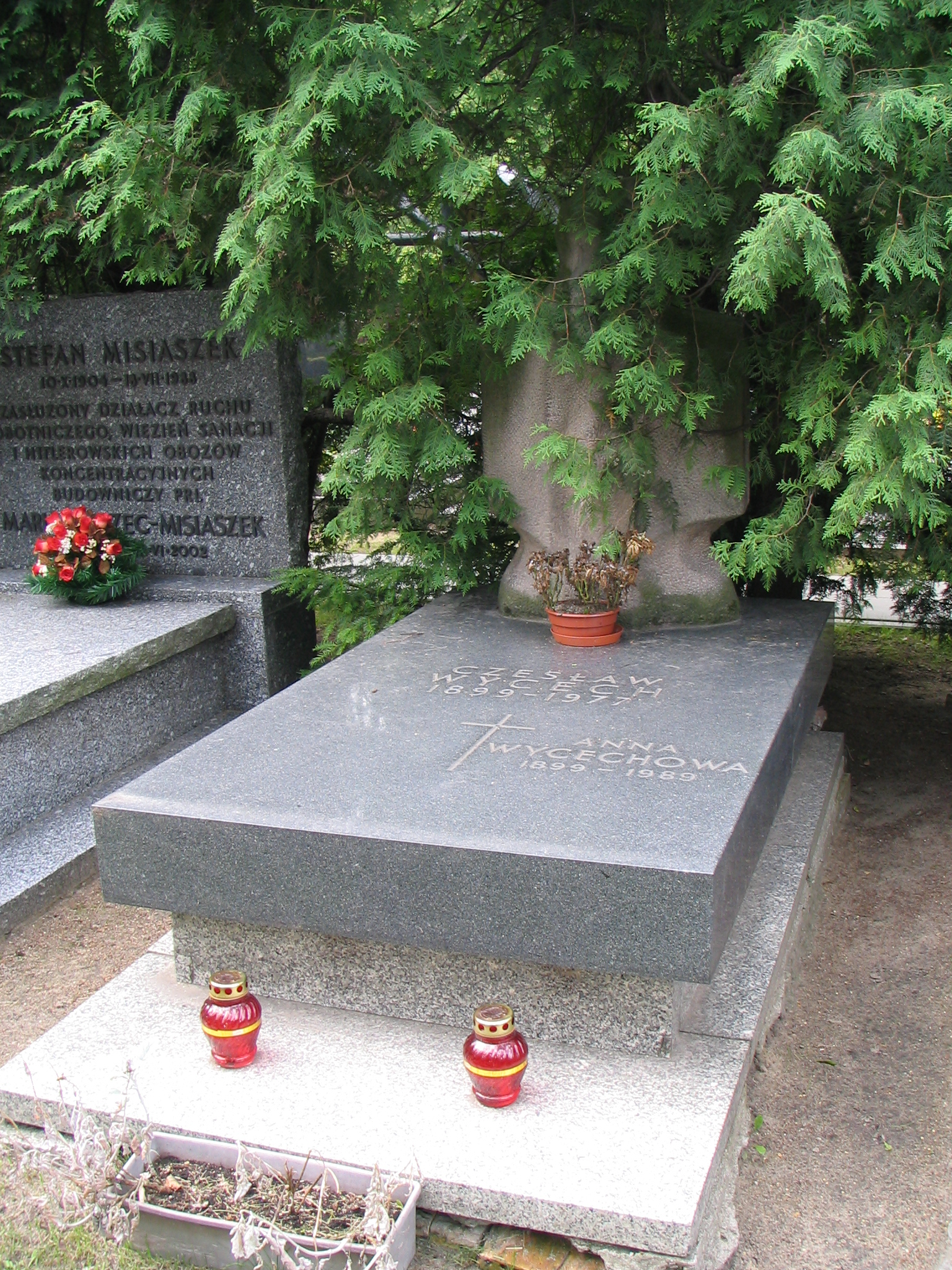
Czesław Wycech tombstone

Czesław Wycech (20 July 1899 – 26 May 1977) was a Polish activist, politician and historian. He was a member of the Polish peasant's parties: the Polish People's Party "Wyzwolenie", the People's Party, the Polish People's Party, and the United People's Party. During World War II he was a member of the Polish Underground State, responsible for organizing underground education. He was the Minister of Education in the Council of National Unity (1945–1947). Within the People's Republic of Poland, he was a member of the Polish parliament (Sejm) and also held other governmental posts.

== Biography ==
Wycech was born to a peasant family on 20 July 1899 in Wilczogęby. A teacher by profession, he graduated from the Teacher's Institute in Warsaw in 1926. He was involved with the peasant movement from around 1917 to 1919; around that time he joined the Polish People's Party "Wyzwolenie" (PSL "Wyzwolenie") and in 1931, the People's Party (SL). He joined the Polish People's Party (PSL) post-World War II in 1945 which by 1949 had become the United People's Party (ZSL). From 1946 until 1971 he was one of the top leaders of PSL and ZSL.

Wycech was an educational activist; during World War II he was an important participant in the underground education in occupied Poland. He was one of the founders of the Secret Teaching Organization (Tajna Organizacja Nauczycielska) in 1939; he later became a member of the Polish Underground State and he was the President of the Department of Culture and Education in the Government Delegation for Poland from 1940 until 1945. He was the President of the Association of Polish Teachers (ZNP) from 1944 until 1945 and from 1945 to 1947, he was the Minister of Education in the Council of National Unity.

He was a deputy chairman of the Polish Council of State from 1956 until 1957. From 1944 to 1971 he was member of the Polish parliament (Sejm, earlier the State National Council). From 1957 to 1971 he was the Marshal of the Sejm.

In 1959 he was decorated with the Order of the Builders of People's Poland for his contributions to peasant studies, development and education.

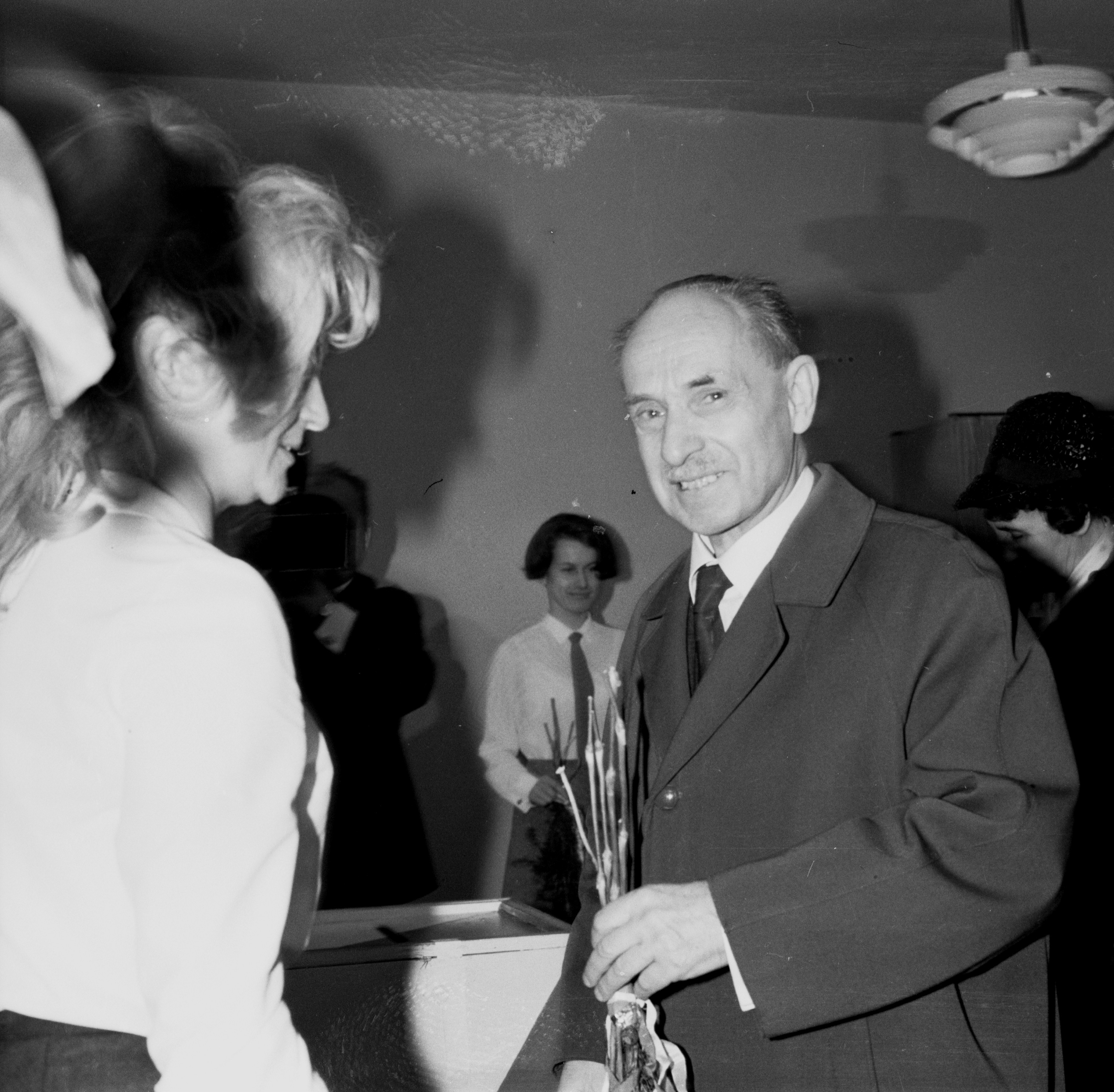
Czesław Wycech votes in the Sejm election, 1 June 1969

== Works ==
- Nauczycielstwo w walce o demokrację (1947)
- Materiały do dziejów ruchu ludowego (1949)
- Z przeszłości ruchów chłopskich, 1768-1861 (1952)
- Ks. Piotr Ściegienny (1953)
- Powstanie chłopskie w roku 1846 (1955)
- 60 lat ruchu ludowego (1957)
- Podstawowe zagadnienia społeczno-polityczne ruchu ludowego (1958)
- Polityczna myśl ludowa w świetle programów stronnictw chłopskich (1959)
- Aktualne zadania polityczne i organizacyjne zjednoczonego Stronnictwa Ludowego (1962)
- Społeczna gospodarka rolna w polskiej myśli politycznej (1963)
- Z dziejów tajnej oświaty w latach okupacji 1939-1945 (1964)
- Wincenty Witos w świetle własnej twórczości pisarskiej (1966)
- Towarzystwo Oświaty Demokratycznej «Nowe Tory» 1931-1939 (1966)

== Awards and decorations ==
- Order of the Builders of People's Poland (1959)
- Commander's Cross of the Order of Polonia Restituta (1955)
- Medal of the 10th Anniversary of People's Poland (1955)
- Badge of the 1000th Anniversary of the Polish State (1963)
- Knight Grand Cross of Order of Merit of the Italian Republic (Italy, 1965)
