= Polish parliamentary elections =

Polish parliamentary elections determine the composition of both chambers of the Polish parliament (the Sejm and the Senate) for the next four years.

== Procedure ==
Both chambers of the Polish parliament are elected directly by Polish citizens.

Elections to both chambers take place simultaneously every four years, on a non-working day.

The right to vote is granted to any Polish citizen who is at least 18 years of age on the election day and who is not legally incapacitated or deprived of public or electoral rights.

The right to run for the Sejm is granted to all eligible voters who are at least 21 years of age on the election day, while the right to run for the Senate is granted to all eligible voters who are at least 30 years of age on the election day. Ineligible to stand as candidates are those convicted by the court and those ruled ineligible by a court decision.

The Sejm members are elected by a proportional representation system based on open party lists in multi-member constituencies. Since 2011, the Senate members are elected in single-member constituencies.

== List of Polish parliamentary elections ==
In the Second Polish Republic

- 1919 Polish parliamentary election
- 1922 Polish parliamentary election
- 1928 Polish parliamentary election
- 1930 Polish parliamentary election
- 1935 Polish parliamentary election
- 1938 Polish parliamentary election

In the Republic of Poland / Polish People's Republic

- 1947 Polish parliamentary election
- 1952 Polish parliamentary election
- 1957 Polish parliamentary election
- 1961 Polish parliamentary election
- 1965 Polish parliamentary election
- 1969 Polish parliamentary election
- 1972 Polish parliamentary election
- 1976 Polish parliamentary election
- 1980 Polish parliamentary election
- 1985 Polish parliamentary election
- 1989 Polish parliamentary election

In the Third Polish Republic

- 1991 Polish parliamentary election
- 1993 Polish parliamentary election
- 1997 Polish parliamentary election
- 2001 Polish parliamentary election
- 2005 Polish parliamentary election
- 2007 Polish parliamentary election
- 2011 Polish parliamentary election
- 2015 Polish parliamentary election
- 2019 Polish parliamentary election
- 2023 Polish parliamentary election
- Next Polish parliamentary election

== See also ==
- Elections in Poland
