= Andrzej Werblan =

Polish historian, politologist and politician (born 1924)

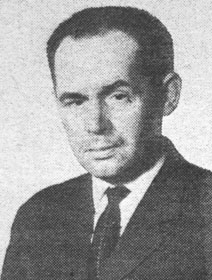
- Andrzej Werblan, 1980
- Born: 30 October 1924 (age 101); Ternopil
- Occupations: Historian, politologist, politician

Andrzej Werblan (born 30 October 1924) is a historian, politologist and politician.

== Biography ==
The son of Jan and Eugenia. Together with his family he was deported to Siberia in 1940. From 1940 to 1943 he worked in a kolkhoz. After the Sikorski–Mayski agreement, he set out to Anders' Army, but he did not reach it; on the way he contracted typhus from lice. From 1943 to 1947 he served in the Polish Army. In 1946 he joined Polish Socialist Party (PPS); he then became a member its Supreme Council. Later he joined Polish United Workers' Party (PZPR). From 1952 to 1955 he studied at the University of Warsaw and at the Institute of Social Sciences at the Central Committee of the Polish United Workers' Party. He was a member of Sejm from 1952 to 1956 and from 1961 to 1985.

At the Central Committee of the Polish United Workers' Party he was a deputy member (from 1948 to 1956), a member (from 1956 to 1981) and secretary (from 1974 to 1980).

In 1958, together with a delegation from the Central Committee of the Polish United Workers' Party headed by Secretary Jerzy Morawski, he spent six weeks in China at the invitation of the General Secretary of the Central Committee of the Chinese Communist Party, Deng Xiaoping.

From 1971 until 1982 he was Deputy Speaker of the Sejm.

From 1972 to 1974 he was editor-in-chief of the magazine Nowe Drogi. From 1974 to 1981 he was director of the Institute for Basic Problems of Marxism-Leninism. He supervised doctoral dissertation of Zygmunt Woźniczka in 1984.

His father-in-law was Bolesław Podedworny; and Hanna Werblan-Jakubiec is his daughter.

== Books ==
- O socjalistyczny kierunek działalności kulturalnej. Warszawa: Książka i Wiedza. 1958.
- Problemy jedności międzynarodowego ruchu komunistycznego w świetle narady moskiewskiej: tezy i materiały dla lektorów i wykładowców szkolenia partyjnego. Warszawa: Wydział Propagandy i Agitacji KC PZPR. 1969.
- Szkice i polemiki. Warszawa: „Książka i Wiedza”. 1970.
- PZPR – kierownicza siła klasy robotniczej i narodu polskiego. Sesja naukowa poświęcona 60-leciu powstania KPP oraz 30-leciu zjednoczenia polskiego ruchu robotniczego i dorobkowi PZPR. Warszawa: Wyższa Szkoła Nauk Społecznych przy KC PZPR. 1978.
- W tyglu polskich przemian. Warszawa: „Książka i Wiedza”. 1981.
- Klasowe i narodowe aspekty myśli politycznej PPR i PZPR: (studia i szkice). Warszawa: Wydawnictwo PWN. 1987.
- Władysław Gomułka sekretarz generalny PPR, Warszawa. „Książka i Wiedza”. 1988.
- Stalinizm w Polsce. Warszawa: „Fakt”. 1991. Second edition – „Przegląd”, 2009.
- Modzelewski – Werblan. Polska Ludowa. With Karol Modzelewski and Robert Walenciak.
- Polska Ludowa. Postscriptum. With Robert Walenciak.

=== Edited works ===
- Rewolucja naukowo-techniczna w warunkach socjalizmu. Warszawa: „Książka i Wiedza”. 1978.

== Honors and awards ==
- Order of the Banner of Labour, 1st class (1969)
- Order of the Builders of People's Poland (1974)
- Medal of the 30th Anniversary of People's Poland (1974)
- Ludwik Waryński Award (1988)
- Commander's Cross of the Order of Polonia Restituta
- Medal „Zasłużonym na Polu Chwały” (three times)
