= Parliament of Poland =

Bicameral legislature of Poland

Parliament of Poland Parlament Rzeczypospolitej Polskiej
- 10th term Sejm and 11th term Senate

Type
- Type: Bicameral
- Houses: Senate (upper); Sejm (lower)
- Term limits: 4 years

Leadership
- Marshal of the Senate: Małgorzata Maria Kidawa- Błońska, PO since 13 November 2023
- Marshal of the Sejm: Włodzimierz Czarzasty, NL since 18 November 2025

Structure
- Seats: 560; consisting of; 100 senators; 460 deputies
- Senate political groups: Government (Third Cabinet of Donald Tusk) (66): KO (43) (Note: KO (36); T!DPL (1); Independent (6)); L (8) (Note: NL (4); UP (1) (Note: Waldemar Witkowski); PPS (1) (Note: Wojciech Konieczny); WJ (2) (Note: Magdalena Biejat, Anna Górska)); TD (8) (Note: PSL (4); PL2050 (1); UED (1) (Note: Michał Kamiński); CdP (1) (Note: Kazimierz Michał Ujazdowski); Independent (1) (Note: Józef Zając)); NP-C (7); Other (1): Non-aligned (1); Opposition (33): PiS (33) (Note: PiS (30); Independent (3))
- Sejm political groups: Government (Third Cabinet of Donald Tusk) (239): KO (156) (Note: KO (153); Greens (2); AU (1)); KP (32) (Note: PSL (28); CdP (3); Independent (1) (Note: Marek Biernacki)); The Left (21) (Note: NL (19); Independent (2) (Note: Daria Gosek-Popiołek, Dorota Olko)); UC (15); PL2050 (15); Supported by (4): Non-aligned (4) (Note: elected on Civic Coalition list (PO): Marcin Józefaciuk elected on Third Way list (PL2050): Joanna Mucha, Paweł Zalewski, Tomasz Zimoch); Opposition (217): PiS (146) (Note: PiS (140); ONRP (4); Independent (2)); R+ (41) (Note: PiS (38) (Note: Simultaneous members of R+, left the PiS parliamentary club but not the party itself.); R+ (2) (Note: Affiliated only with R+, and not any political party.); WR (1) (Note: Marek Jakubiak)); KWiN (16) (Note: NN (8); RN (7); Independent (1) (Note: Andrzej Zapałowski)); Razem (4); DB (4) (Note: K'15 (2); WiD (1); Independent (1)); KKP (3); Non-aligned (3) (Note: elected on The Left list (Razem): Paulina Matysiak elected on United Right list (PiS): Łukasz Mejza, Janusz Kowalski)

Elections
- Senate voting system: First-past-the-post voting
- Sejm voting system: Proportional representation^{a}
- Last Senate election: 15 October 2023
- Last Sejm election: 15 October 2023
- Next Senate election: 2027
- Next Sejm election: 2027

Meeting place
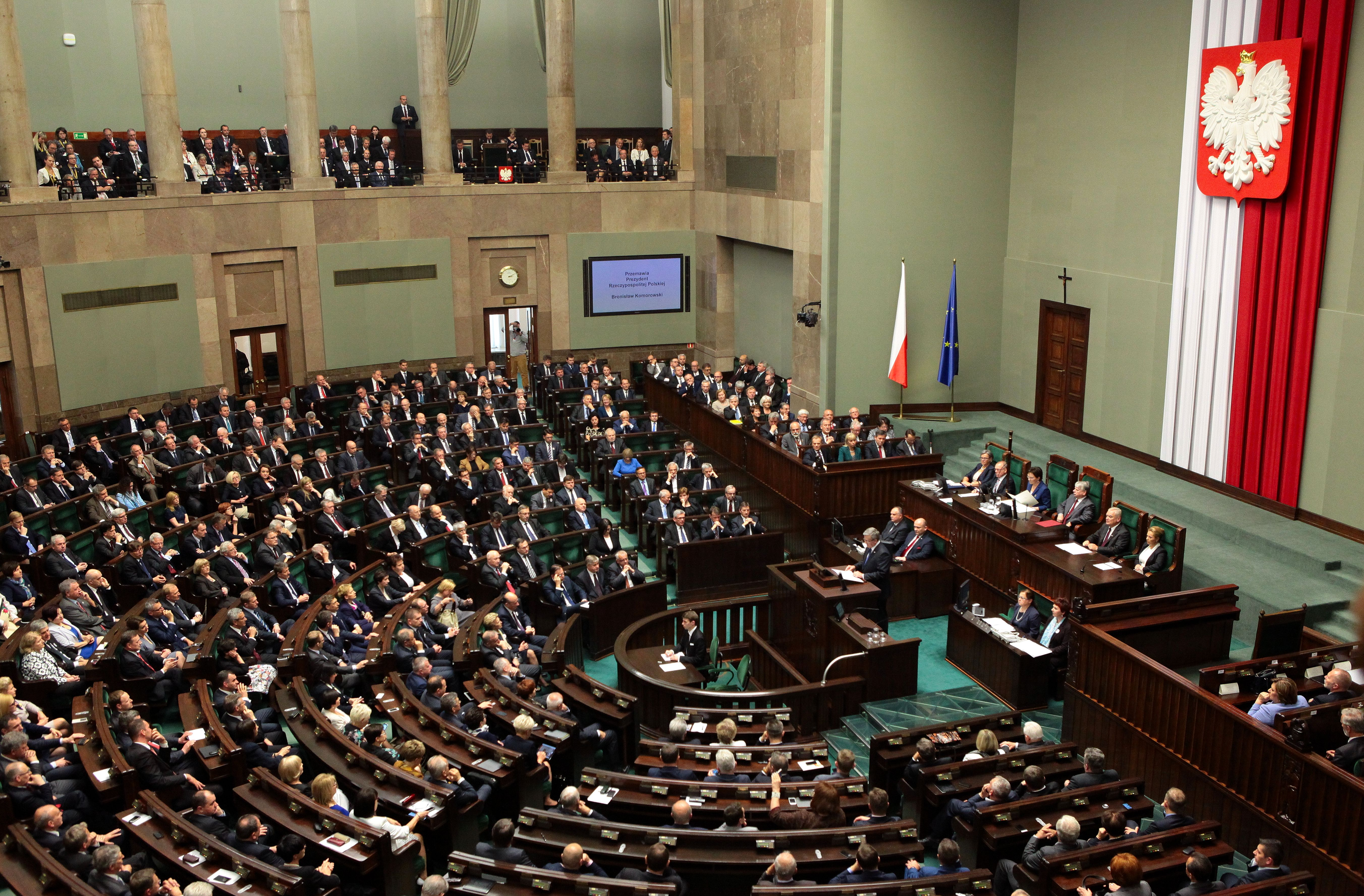
- Sejm chamber, Warsaw
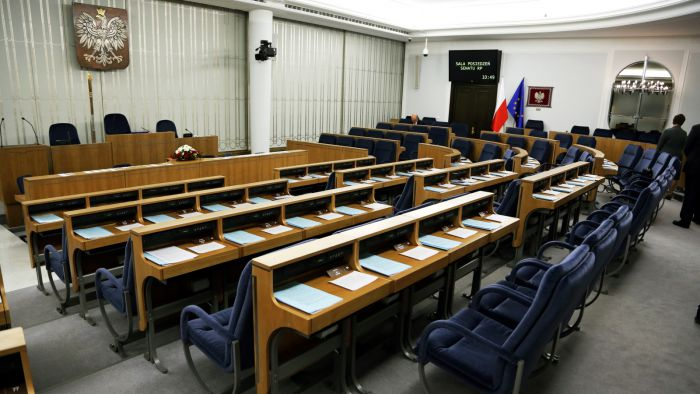
- Senate chamber, Warsaw

Footnotes
- ^{a} Open-list proportional representation in 41 constituencies (5% national electoral threshold, 8% national electoral threshold for coalitions).

The Parliament of Poland is the bicameral legislature of Poland. It is composed of an upper house (the Senate) and a lower house (the Sejm). Both houses are accommodated in the Sejm and Senate Complex in Warsaw. The Constitution of Poland does not refer to the Parliament as a body, but only to the Sejm and Senate.

Members of both houses are elected by direct election, usually every four years. The Sejm has 460 members, while the Senate has 100 senators. To become law, a bill must first be approved by both houses, but the Sejm can override a Senate refusal to pass a bill.

On certain occasions, the marshal of the Sejm summons the National Assembly, a joint session of the members of both houses. It is mostly ceremonial in nature, and it only convenes occasionally, such as to witness the inauguration of the president. Under exceptional circumstances, the constitution endows the National Assembly with great responsibilities and powers, such as to bring the president before the State Tribunal (impeachment). The largest party in the Sejm is Law and Justice (PiS) with 194 out of 460 seats in Sejm. Civic Coalition is leading in the Senate with 42 out of 100 seats. The two debating halls have designated seats for the deputies, senators and the single Marshal (speaker) of each. Senators and deputies are equipped with voting devices.

== Parliamentary groups and affiliations ==
After election deputies and senators will remain or splinter into deputy or senatorial groupings, or have no affiliations and sit as "independents". In both chambers, there are two formal sizes of groups: Clubs (Polish: kluby, klub (sing.) which are the entire party groups of the elected, where none have splintered away or defected to another klub) and circles (Polish: koła, koło (sing.)). The primary difference between these is the degree of right to join and contribute to the relevant Seniors' Konwent (Polish: Konwent Seniorów), the procedural committee that determines the drafting of agendas and chamber workings.

In the Sejm,

- Clubs consist of at least 15 deputies;
- Groups consist of at least 3 deputies.

In the Senate,

- Clubs consist of at least 7 senators;
- Groups consist of at least 3 senators.

== National Assembly ==
The National Assembly (Polish: Zgromadzenie Narodowe) is the name of a joint sitting of the Sejm and the Senate. It is headed by the Marshal of the Sejm (or by the Marshal of the Senate when the former is absent).

Under the Constitution of Poland the National Assembly has the authority to:

- declare the president's permanent incapacity to exercise his duties due to the state of his health (by a majority vote of at least two-thirds of the statutory number of members),
- bring an indictment against the president to the State Tribunal (by a majority of at least two-thirds of the statutory number of members, on the motion of at least 140 members),
- adopt its own rules of procedure.

The National Assembly is also called in order to:

- receive the president's oath of office,
- hear a presidential address (however, the president may choose to deliver his address to either the Sejm or the Senate).

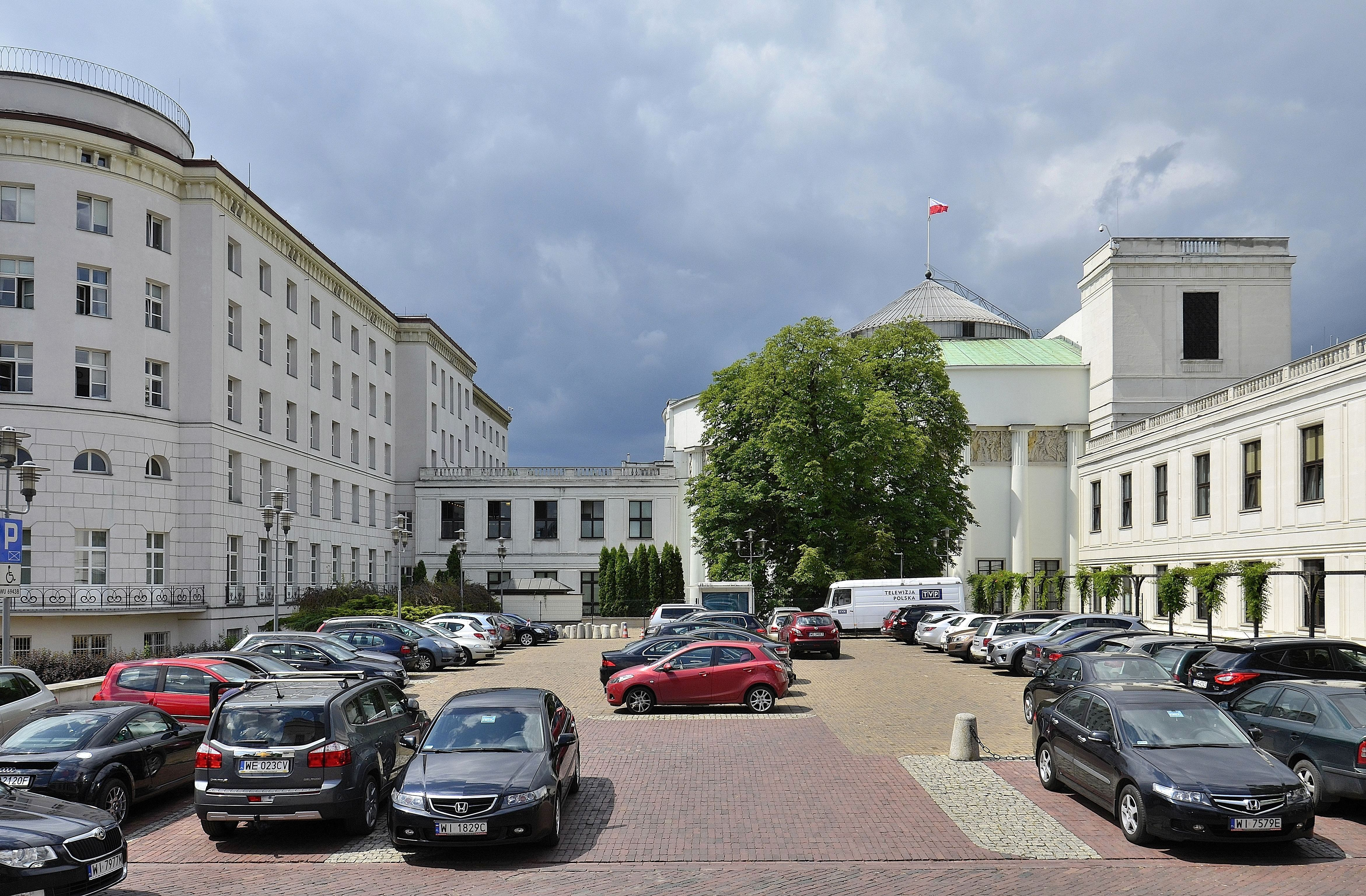
Sejm and Senate Complex of Poland

In the periods 1922–1935 and 1989–1990, it was this joint sitting which elected the president of the Republic of Poland by an absolute majority of votes. In and from 1935, it was replaced by an Assembly of Electors, which consisted of the Marshal of the Senate (as president of the Assembly of Electors), the Marshal of the Sejm, the Prime Minister, the Chief Justice, the General Armed Forces Inspector, 50 electors elected by the Sejm, and 25 electors elected by the Senate. Because of World War II, Assembly of Electors has never been convened. After the war, the Senate was abolished in 1946 so in 1947 Bolesław Bierut was elected president only by the Sejm. There were no presidents from 1952 until 1989 when the Senate was restored and the National Assembly elected Wojciech Jaruzelski as president.

Since 1990, the president has been elected by the people. However, the president is still sworn in before the National Assembly, which is also the only organ which can declare the president's permanent incapacity to perform his duties, or bring an indictment against him before State Tribunal.

From 1992 to 1997, the National Assembly drafted and passed a new Constitution, which was approved by a national referendum on 25 May 1997.

== Current standings ==
=== Sejm ===
Club	Leader	Parties	Seats	Status
Law and Justice	Mariusz Błaszczak	Law and Justice	179	Opposition
Law and Justice	Mariusz Błaszczak	Renewal of the Republic of Poland	6	Opposition
Law and Justice	Mariusz Błaszczak	Independent	3	Opposition
Law and Justice	Mariusz Błaszczak	Total seats	188	Opposition
Civic Coalition	Zbigniew Konwiński	Civic Platform	125	Government
Civic Coalition	Zbigniew Konwiński	Modern	10	Government
Civic Coalition	Zbigniew Konwiński	The Greens	3	Government
Civic Coalition	Zbigniew Konwiński	Polish Initiative	2	Government
Civic Coalition	Zbigniew Konwiński	Yes! For Poland	2	Government
Civic Coalition	Zbigniew Konwiński	AGROunia	1	Government
Civic Coalition	Zbigniew Konwiński	Independent	13	Government
Civic Coalition	Zbigniew Konwiński	Total seats	157	Government
Poland 2050	Paweł Śliz	Poland 2050	30	Government
Polish People's Party	Piotr Zgorzelski	Polish People's Party	28	Government
Polish People's Party	Piotr Zgorzelski	Centre for Poland	3	Government
Polish People's Party	Piotr Zgorzelski	Independent	1	Government
Polish People's Party	Piotr Zgorzelski	Total seats	32	Government
The Left	Anna Maria Żukowska	New Left	18	Government
The Left	Anna Maria Żukowska	Independent	3	Government
The Left	Anna Maria Żukowska	Total seats	21	Government
Confederation	Grzegorz Płaczek	New Hope	8	Opposition
Confederation	Grzegorz Płaczek	National Movement	7	Opposition
Confederation	Grzegorz Płaczek	Independent	1	Opposition
Confederation	Grzegorz Płaczek	Total seats	16	Opposition
Left Together	Marcelina Zawisza	Left Together	5	Opposition
Free Republicans	Marek Jakubiak	Kukiz'15	3	Opposition
Free Republicans	Marek Jakubiak	Freedom and Prosperity	1	Opposition
Free Republicans	Marek Jakubiak	Total seats	4	Opposition
Confederation of the Polish Crown	Włodzimierz Skalik	Confederation of the Polish Crown	3	Opposition
Independent	—	Independent	4	3 Support 1 Non-Aligned
Total			460	

=== Senate ===
Club	Leader	Parties	Seats	Status
Civic Coalition	Tomasz Grodzki	Civic Platform	36	Government
Civic Coalition	Tomasz Grodzki	Yes! For Poland	1	Government
Civic Coalition	Tomasz Grodzki	Independent	5	Government
Civic Coalition	Tomasz Grodzki	Total seats	42	Government
Law and Justice	Stanisław Karczewski	Law and Justice	30	Opposition
Law and Justice	Stanisław Karczewski	Independent	4	Opposition
Law and Justice	Stanisław Karczewski	Total seats	34	Opposition
Third Way	Waldemar Pawlak	Poland 2050	5	Government
Third Way	Waldemar Pawlak	Polish People's Party	4	Government
Third Way	Waldemar Pawlak	Centre for Poland	1	Government
Third Way	Waldemar Pawlak	Union of European Democrats	1	Government
Third Way	Waldemar Pawlak	Independent	1	Government
Third Way	Waldemar Pawlak	Total seats	12	Government
The Left	Anna Górska Maciej Kopiec	New Left	4	Government
The Left	Anna Górska Maciej Kopiec	Labour Union	1	Government
The Left	Anna Górska Maciej Kopiec	Polish Socialist Party	1	Government
The Left	Anna Górska Maciej Kopiec	Independent	2	Government
The Left	Anna Górska Maciej Kopiec	Total seats	8	Government
New Poland	Zygmunt Frankiewicz	New Poland	3	—
Independent	—	Independent	1	—
Total			100	
