= 1980 Polish parliamentary election =

- 23 March 1980

All 460 seats in the Sejm
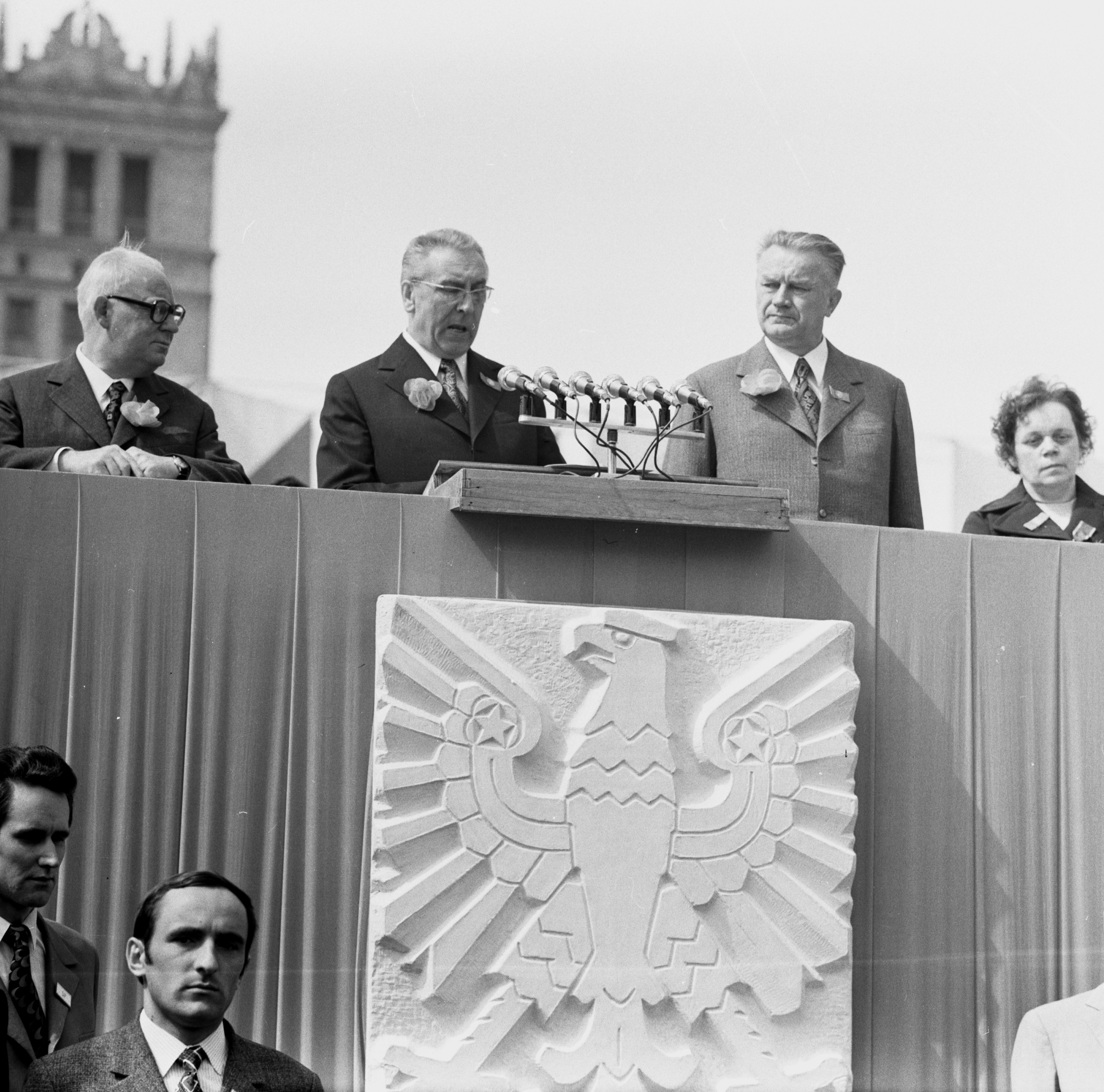

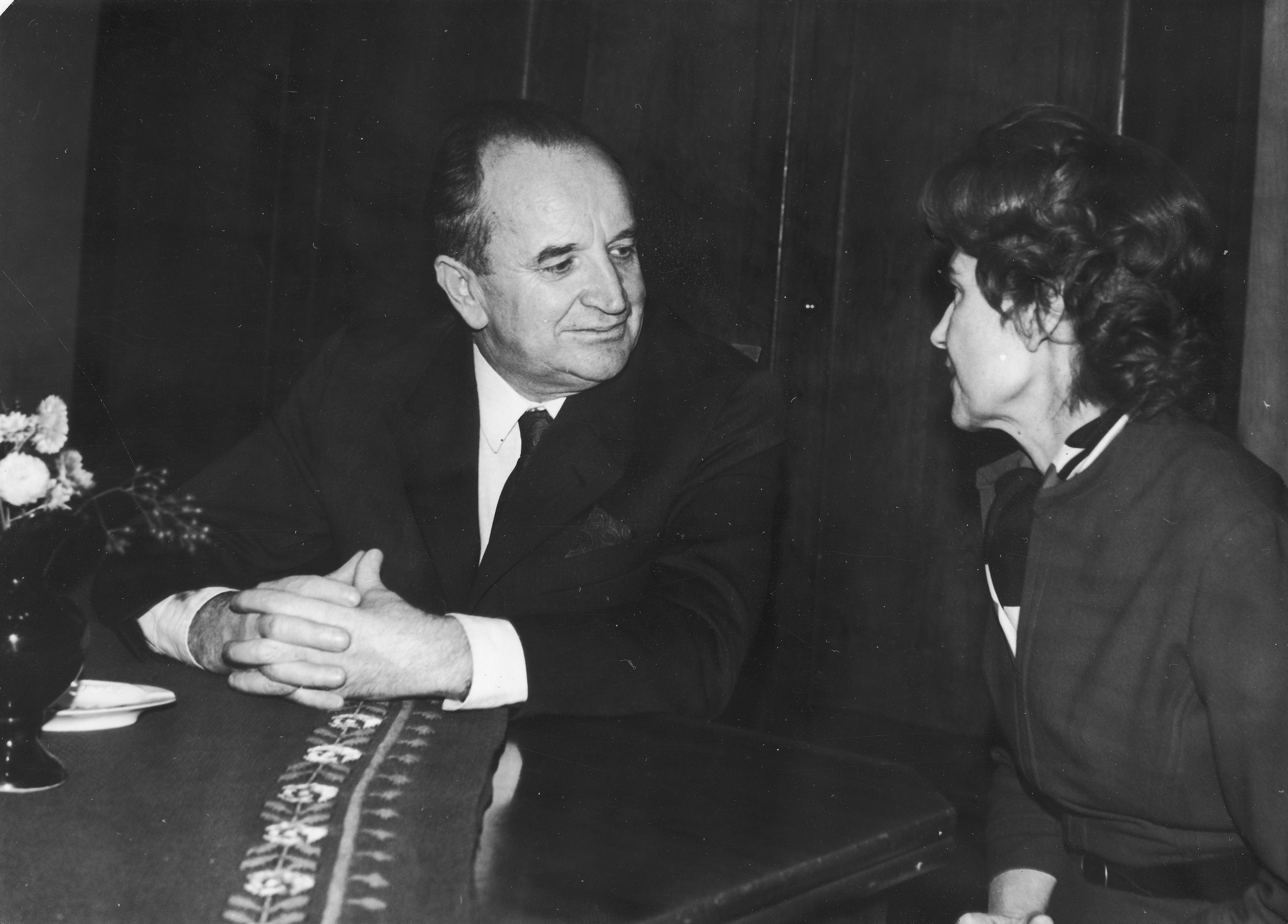

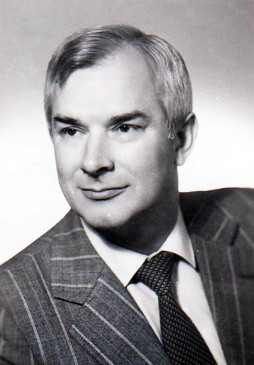
	Majority party	Minority party	Third party
Leader	Edward Gierek	Stanisław Gucwa	Tadeusz Witold Młyńczak
Party	PZPR	ZSL	SD
Alliance	FJN	FJN	FJN
Last election	261 seats	113 seats	37 seats
Seats won	261	113	37
Seat change	Steady	Steady	Steady

Parliamentary elections were held in Poland on 23 March 1980. The results, like with the other elections in communist Poland, were controlled by the communist government. The results of the 1980 election exactly duplicated the 1976 elections, which were only marginally different from those of the preceding years.

== Results ==
Party or alliance		Votes	%	Seats	+/–
Front of National Unity	Polish United Workers' Party	24,683,056	99.52	261	0
Front of National Unity	United People's Party	24,683,056	99.52	113	0
Front of National Unity	Democratic Party	24,683,056	99.52	37	0
Front of National Unity	Independents	24,683,056	99.52	49	0
Blank ballots		119,556	0.48	–	–
Total		24,802,612	100.00	460	0
Valid votes		24,802,612	99.94		
Invalid votes		13,692	0.06		
Total votes		24,816,304	100.00		
Registered voters/turnout		25,098,816	98.87		
Source: Nohlen & Stöver

As the other parties and "independents" were subordinate to PZPR, its control of the Sejm was total.
