= Polish United Workers' Party =

Ruling party of Poland from 1948 to 1989

Polish United Workers' Party Polska Zjednoczona Partia Robotnicza
- Abbreviation: PZPR
- Founded: 21 December 1948; 77 years ago
- Dissolved: 30 January 1990; 36 years ago
- Merger of: Polish Workers' Party; Polish Socialist Party
- Succeeded by: Social Democracy of the Republic of Poland (main successor)
- Headquarters: Nowy Świat 6/12, 00-497 Warsaw, Poland
- Newspaper: Trybuna Ludu
- Youth wing: Polish Socialist Youth Union
- Membership: 3,000,000 (1980's est.)
- Ideology: Communism; Marxism–Leninism (Note: The party was committed to Marxism–Leninism throughout its existence, with a strong emphasis on left-wing nationalism. Stalinism exerted as the dominant form of Marxism–Leninism until 1956, and after 1956 included elements of Endo-communism (hardline faction) and democratic socialism (reformist faction).)
- National affiliation: Front of National Unity (Note: (1948–1983)); Patriotic Movement for National Rebirth (Note: (20 July 1982 – 8 November 1989))
- International affiliation: Information Bureau of the Communist and Workers' Parties
- Colours: Red
- Slogan: Proletariusze wszystkich krajów, łączcie się! ('Workers of the world, unite!')
- Anthem: "The Internationale"

The Polish United Workers' Party (Polish: Polska Zjednoczona Partia Robotnicza [ˈpɔlska zjɛdnɔˈt͡ʂɔna ˈpartja rɔbɔtˈɲit͡ʂa], PZPR) was the Marxist-Leninist party which ruled the Polish People's Republic as a one-party state from 1948 to 1989. The PZPR had led two other legally permitted subordinate minor parties together as the Front of National Unity and later Patriotic Movement for National Rebirth. The Polish United Workers' Party had total control over public institutions in the country as well as the Polish People's Army, the UB and SB security agencies, the Citizens' Militia (MO) police force and the media.

The falsified 1947 Polish legislative election granted the Communist Polish Workers' Party (PPR) complete political authority in post-war Poland. The PZPR was founded forthwith in December 1948 through the unification of the PPR and the Polish Socialist Party (PPS). From 1952 onward, the position of "First Secretary" of the Polish United Workers' Party was de facto equivalent to Poland's head of state. Throughout its existence, the PZPR maintained close ties with ideologically similar parties of the Eastern Bloc, most notably the Socialist Unity Party of Germany, Communist Party of Czechoslovakia and the Communist Party of the Soviet Union. Between 1948 and 1954, nearly 1.5 million individuals registered as Polish United Workers' Party members, and membership rose to 3 million by 1980.

Ideologically, the party was based on the theories of Marxism–Leninism, with a strong emphasis on left-wing nationalism. It was also described as a "hybrid populist party that combined (nativist) right-wing and (economic) left-wing ideology". Later, in 1988–1989 some factions of the party adopted milder democratic socialism, which was seen as the impact of the perestroika in the neighbouring Soviet Union. Its primary objective was to impose socialist agenda unto Polish society. The communist government sought to nationalize all institutions. Some concepts imported from abroad, such as large-scale collective farming and secularization, failed in their early stages. The PZPR was considered more liberal and pro-Western than its counterparts in East Germany or the Soviet Union, and was more averse to radical politics. Although propaganda was utilized in major media outlets like Trybuna Ludu (lit. 'People's Tribune') and televised Dziennik ('Journal'), censorship became ineffective by the mid-1980s and was gradually abolished. On the other hand, the Polish United Worker's Party was responsible for the pacification of civil resistance and protesters in the Poznań protests of 1956, the 1970 Polish protests and throughout martial law between 1981 and 1983. The PZPR also initiated an antisemitic campaign during the 1968 Polish political crisis, which forced the remainder of Poland's Jews to emigrate.

Amidst the ongoing political and economic crises, the Solidarity movement emerged as a major anti-bureaucratic social movement that pursued social change. With communist rule being relaxed in neighbouring countries, the PZPR systematically lost support and was forced to negotiate with the opposition and adhere to the Polish Round Table Agreement, which permitted free democratic elections. The elections on 4 June 1989 proved victorious for Solidarity, thus bringing 40-year communist rule in Poland to an end. The Polish United Workers' Party was dissolved in January 1990 and was succeeded by Social Democracy of the Republic of Poland along with several parties claiming the legacy of the PZPR. Though the SdRP performed modestly in elections, it was later merged into the Democratic Left Alliance in 1999; and turn became part of the New Left coalition in 2021.

== Programme and goals ==
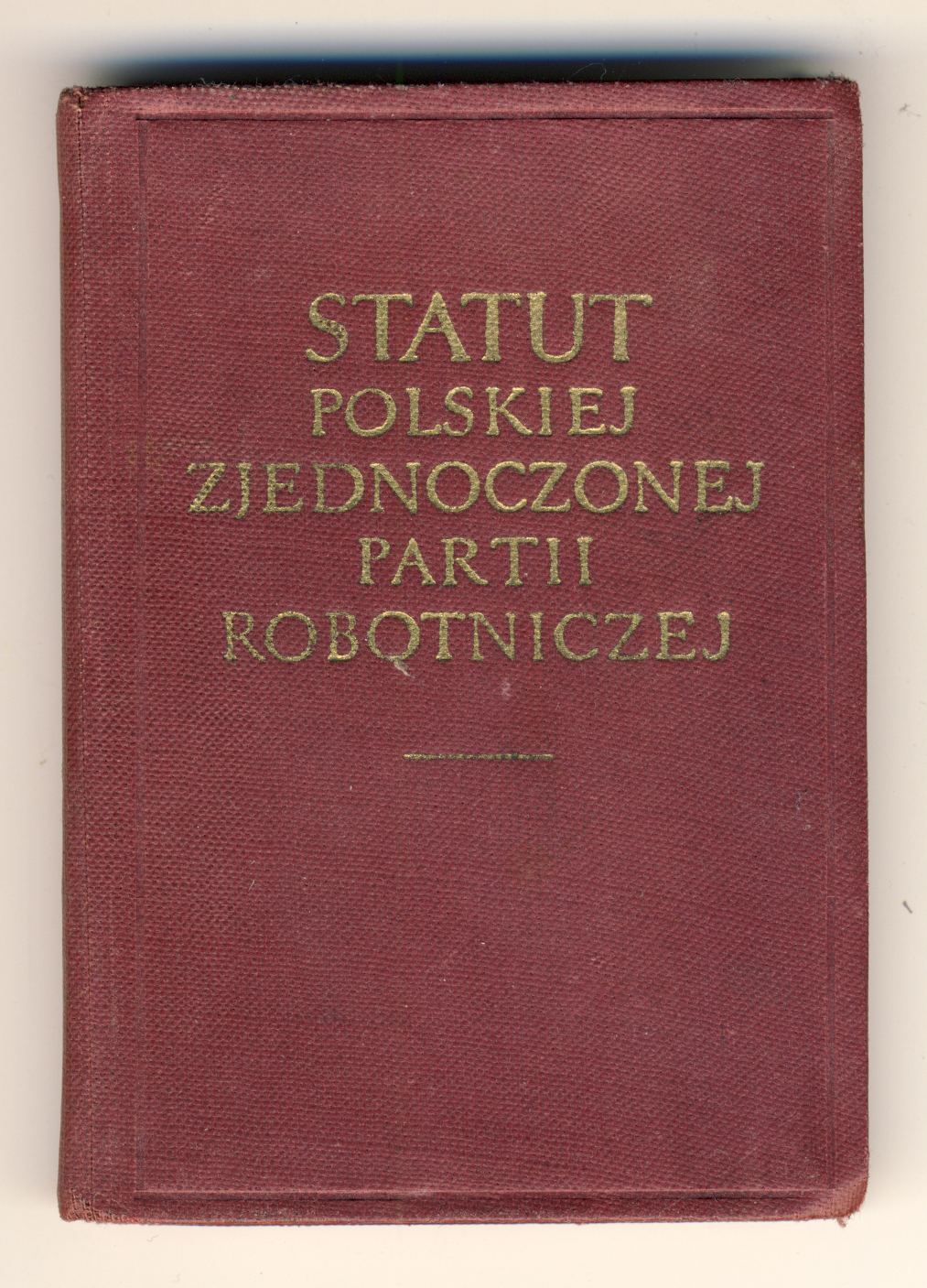
Statute of the Polish United Workers' Party, 1956 edition

Until 1989, the PZPR held dictatorial powers (the amendment to the constitution of 1976 mentioned "a leading national force") and controlled an unwieldy bureaucracy, the military, the secret police, and the economy. Its main goal was to create a Communist society and help to propagate Communism all over the world. On paper, the party was organised on the basis of democratic centralism, which assumed a democratic appointment of authorities, making decisions, and managing its activity. These authorities decided about the policy and composition of the main organs; although, according to the statute, it was a responsibility of the members of the congress, which was held every five or six years. Between sessions, the regional, county, district and work committees held party conferences. The smallest organizational unit of the PZPR was the Fundamental Party Organization (FPO), which functioned in workplaces, schools, cultural institutions, etc.

The main part in the PZPR was played by professional politicians, or the so-called "party's hardcore", formed by people who were recommended to manage the main state institutions, social organizations, and trade unions. The crowning time of the PZPR development (the end of the 1970s) consisted of over 3.5 million members. The Political Office of the Central Committee, Secretariat and regional committees appointed the key posts within the party and in all organizations having 'state' in its name – from central offices to even small state and cooperative companies. It was called the nomenklatura system of state and economy management. In certain areas of the economy, e.g., in agriculture, the nomenklatura system was controlled with the approval of the PZPR and by its allied parties, the United People's Party (agriculture and food production), and the Democratic Party (trade community, small enterprise, some cooperatives). After martial law began, the Patriotic Movement for National Rebirth was founded to organize these and other parties.

PZPR was regarded as a socially conservative and national communist movement. Political scientist Gerald M. Easter argues that ever since Władysław Gomułka came to power in 1956 and introduced his "Polish road to socialism", the PZPR abandoned any ambition to transform the Polish culture or society, opting instead to preserve traditional values. Polish communists rejected the communist ideal of a radical change in social norms, family and interpersonal relations; Gomułka abandoned collectivization of the agriculture and instead "re-enshrined the family" and "traditional peasant villages". Female tractors drivers, infamous in the 1940s, disappeared in favor of laws that banned women from 'masculine' jobs. Welfare and childcare funding patterns were also changed to encourage return to traditional nurting roles for women, including pushing grandmothers to retire early. Polish communists "stopped trying to create an internationalist, cosmopolitan, socialist subjects" and instead became "national, even nationalistic". This became particularly prominent after the rise of the Endo-Communist Partisans faction to power in the 1960s. Socialist Poland promoted the red-and-white Polish flag while sideling the communist red one, and stressed its national character, always discussing "Polish proletariat" or "Polish communism" in its declarations. According to Easter, the PZPR "glorified ethno-national homogeneity, resurrecting old stories about national martyrdom in the struggle for independence" and promoted "hatred towards foreigners, particularly Germans and Jews". This also led to the members of the Endecja movement collaborating with the communists and attaining prominent positions within the state apparatus. Writing on the fall of the PZPR, Easter wrote:

By the 1970s and 1980s, the PZPR itself had moved away from earlier forms of Leninism and Stalinism, toward national communism. That was the ideology overthrown in 1989. For anyone who embraced the broad framework of liberal democracy (stretching from social democrats through libertarians to Christian democrats), this was an unambiguous victory. But many in Poland did not want that sort of revolution back in the 1980s. Instead, they longed for a state that would repudiate the whole liberal vertex. They wanted a state that would preserve the PZPR's commitment to social cohesion, cultural homogeneity, and nationalism, but imbue it with a Catholic rather than a leftist vocabulary.

== History ==
=== Establishment and Sovietization period ===
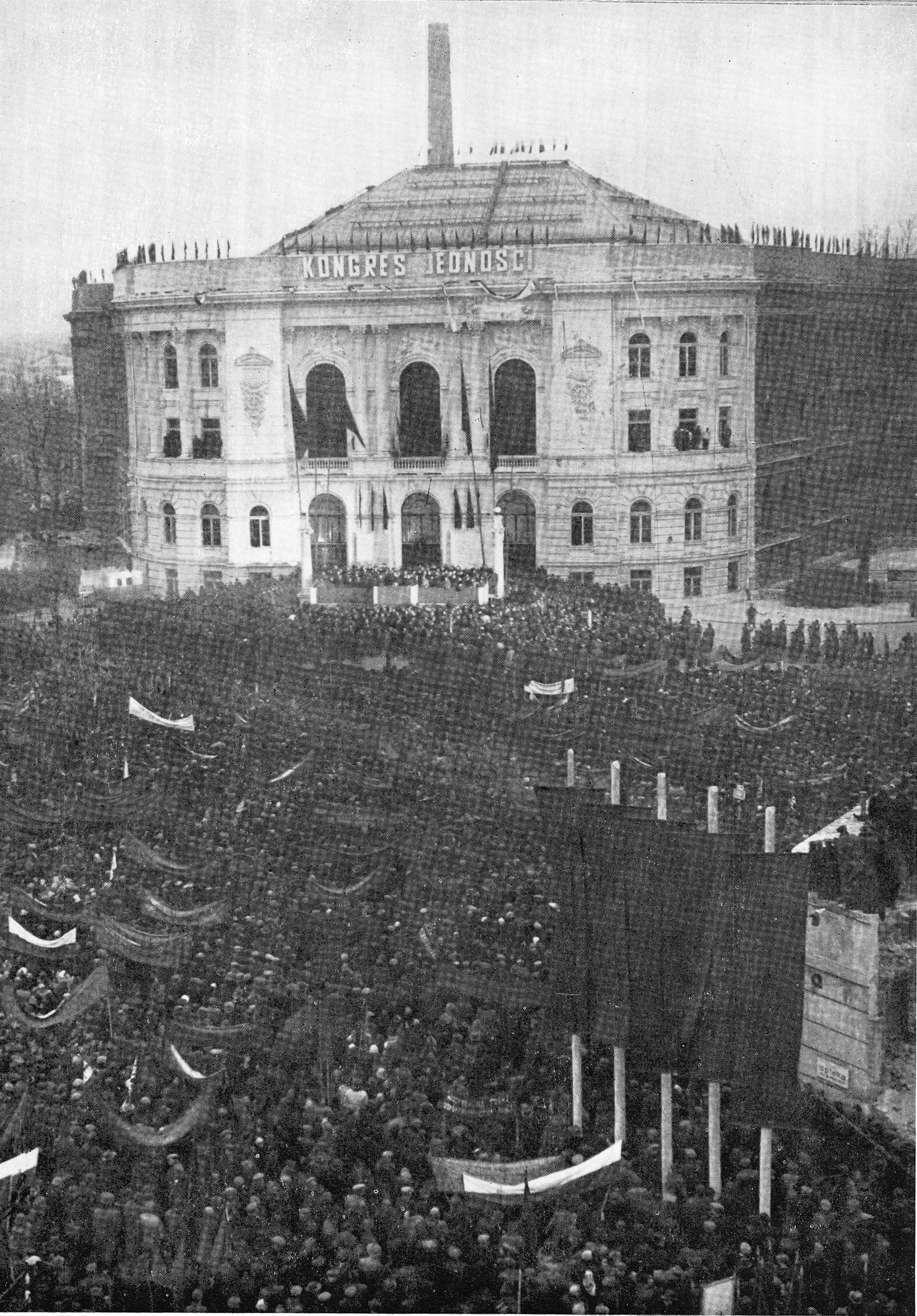
Crowds gathered in front of the main building of Warsaw University of Technology for the Unification Congress of the Polish Workers' Party and Polish Socialist Party (15 to 21 December 1948)

On 14 December 1948, the 2nd Congress of the PPR and the 28th Congress of the PPS were held simultaneously, at which the decision was made to unite both parties. The Polish United Workers' Party was established at the unification congress of the Communist Polish Workers' Party and the Polish Socialist Party during meetings held at the main building of the Warsaw University of Technology from 15 to 21 December 1948. The unification was possible because the PPS had effectively been taken over by pro-Communist fellow travelers, and the activists who opposed unification had been forced out of the party. Similarly, the members of the PPR who were accused of "rightist–nationalist deviation" (Polish: odchylenie prawicowo-nacjonalistyczne) were expelled. Thus, the merger was actually an absorption of the PPS by the PPR, resulting in what was a renamed and enlarged PPR for all intents and purposes.

The new party included about 1 million members of the PPR and about 0.5 million members of the PPS. The highest positions in the party were taken by members of the PPR. The Political Bureau established during the Unification Congress included: Bierut, Jakub Berman, Józef Cyrankiewicz, Hilary Minc, Stanisław Radkiewicz, Adam Rapacki, Marian Spychalski, Henryk Świątkowski, Roman Zambrowski and Aleksander Zawadzki. All of them - in accordance with the Soviet model - held high positions in the state apparatus at the same time.

"Rightist-nationalist deviation" was a political propaganda term used by the Polish Stalinists against prominent activists, such as Władysław Gomułka and Marian Spychalski who opposed Soviet involvement in the Polish internal affairs, as well as internationalism displayed by the creation of the Cominform and the subsequent merger that created the PZPR. It is believed that it was Joseph Stalin who put pressure on Bolesław Bierut and Jakub Berman to remove Gomułka and Spychalski as well as their followers from power in 1948. It is estimated that over 25% of socialists were removed from power or expelled from political life.

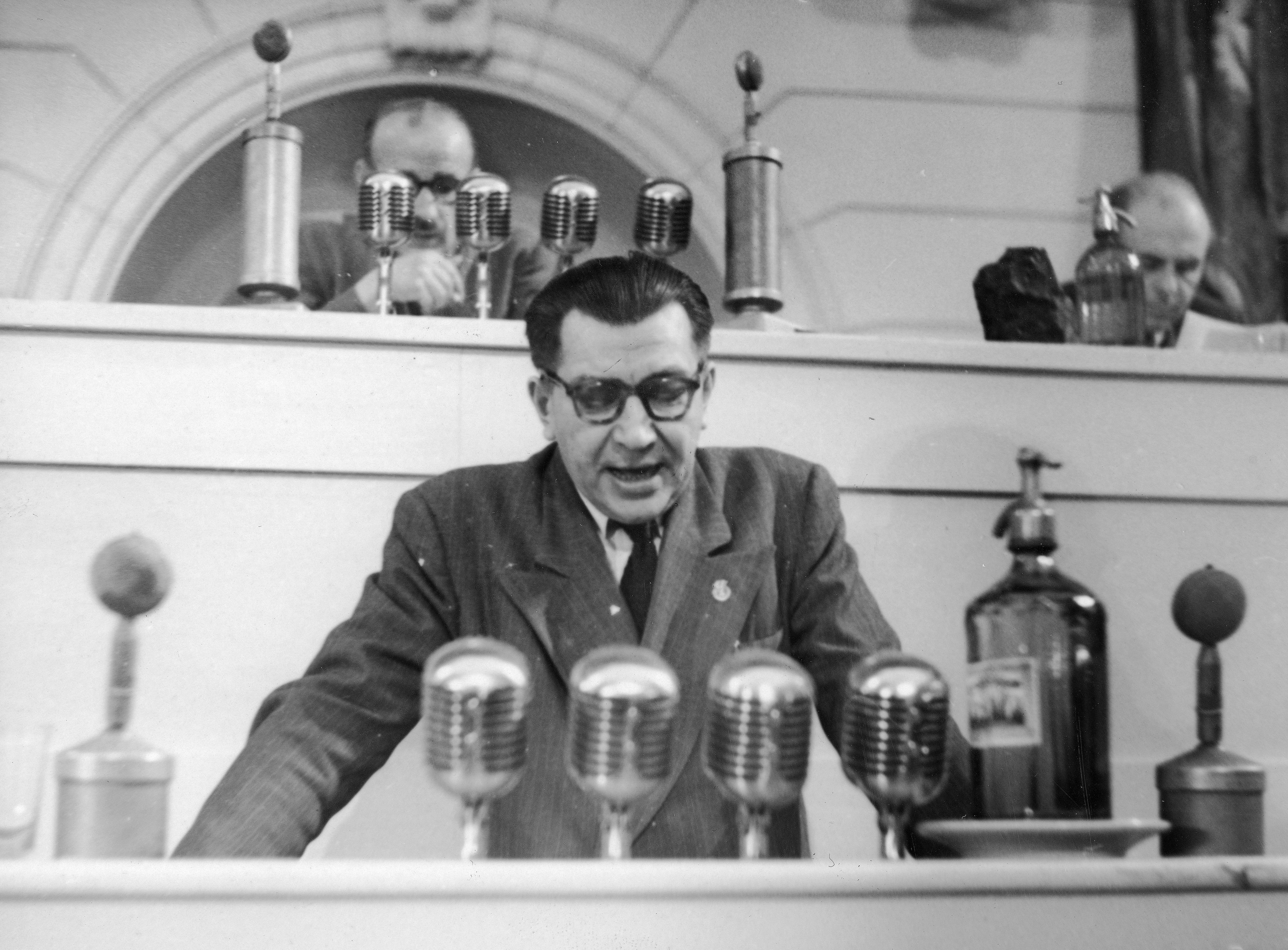
Bolesław Gebert addresses the Unification Congress of the PPR and PPS, December 1948

On 20–21 April 1949, a plenum of the Central Committee of the Polish United Workers' Party was held, devoted to matters of culture and science. Party apparatchiks demanded a bold "ideological offensive", i.e. the introduction of socialist realism to culture. In this way, the direction of action already imposed on the writers during the January congress in Szczecin was continued. Alongside Jerzy Albrecht and Jerzy Putrament - the main speakers pointing to the need to popularize socialist realism - Henryk Jabłoński appeared, criticizing the state of history teaching at universities.

Bolesław Bierut, an NKVD agent and a hardline Stalinist, served as first Secretary General of the ruling PZPR from 1948 to 1956, playing a leading role in imposing communism and the installation of its repressive regime. He had served as president since 1944 (though on a provisional basis until 1947). After a new constitution abolished the presidency, Bierut took over as prime minister, a post he held until 1954. He remained party leader until his death in 1956.

Bierut oversaw the trials of many Polish wartime military leaders, such as General Stanisław Tatar and Brig. General Emil August Fieldorf, as well as 40 members of the Wolność i Niezawisłość (Freedom and Independence) organisation, various Church officials and many other opponents of the new regime including Witold Pilecki, condemned to death during secret trials. Bierut signed many of those death sentences.

Bierut's mysterious death in Moscow in 1956 (shortly after attending the 20th Congress of the Communist Party of the Soviet Union) gave rise to much speculation about poisoning or a suicide, and symbolically marked the end of Stalinism era in Poland.

On 11–13 November 1949, a plenum of the Central Committee of the Polish United Workers' Party was held, which was devoted to the tasks of the party in the fight for revolutionary vigilance. The plenum was dedicated to two leading topics: increasing indoctrination and continuing the fight against right-wing nationalist deviation. In relation to the first topic, an offensive of propaganda activities and intensification of the ideologization of public life were assumed. Yet, in connection with the strengthening of the sole rule of Bolesław Bierut, the deliberations were largely dominated by aggressive criticism of Władysław Gomułka and people from his circle. The latter, weakened by the removal from state functions, was also deprived of party functions during the plenum, by removing him from the Central Committee. At the same time, his co-authors, Marian Spychalski and Zenon Kliszko, were excluded from the party authorities.

On 24–25 November 1953, a secret session of the Political Bureau of the Central Committee of the Polish United Workers' Party was held. Cliques began to emerge within the leadership of the Polish United Workers' Party, representing different possibilities of overcoming the political and economic crisis that plagued the Polish People's Republic. The criticism of the Ministry of Public Security made during the session indicated that the leadership of the ministry would become a "scapegoat" on which the PZPR leaders would blame the responsibility for the terror reigning in the Polish People's Republic.

=== Gomułka's autarchic communism ===
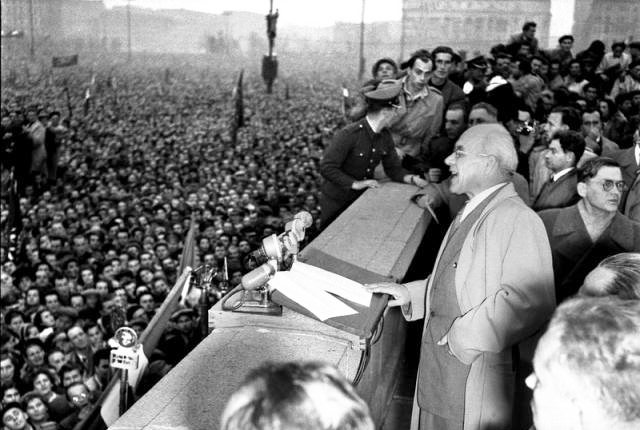
Władysław Gomułka, at the height of his popularity, on 24 October 1956, addressing hundreds of thousands of people in Warsaw, asked for an end to demonstrations and a return to work. "United with the working class and the nation", he concluded, "the Party will lead Poland along a new way of socialism".

On 20 March 1956, shortly after the 20th Congress of the Communist Party of the Soviet Union, the VI Plenary Session of the Central Committee of the Polish United Workers' Party was held, during which the memory of Bolesław Bierut was honored. Jerzy Albrecht and Edward Gierek were co-opted as secretaries of the Central Committee. In the fight for the election of Bierut's successor, the PZPR leadership split into two factions, dubbed Natolinians and Puławians. The Natolin faction – named after the place where its meetings took place, in a government villa in Natolin – were against the post-Stalinist liberalization programs (Gomułka thaw). The most well known members included Franciszek Jóźwiak, Wiktor Kłosiewicz, Zenon Nowak, Aleksander Zawadzki, Władysław Dworakowski, Hilary Chełchowski.

The Puławian faction – the name comes from the Puławska Street in Warsaw, on which many of the members lived – sought great liberalization of socialism in Poland. After the events of Poznań June, they successfully backed the candidature of Władysław Gomułka for First Secretary of party, thus imposing a major setback upon Natolinians. Among the most prominent members were Roman Zambrowski and Leon Kasman. Both factions disappeared towards the end of the 1950s.

During the plenum, the "Natolinians" candidate for the position of First Secretary was Zenon Nowak, who gained Khrushchev's favor. In turn, the Puławians put forward Roman Zambrowski. Ultimately, because none of the cliques was strong enough to take over full power, an amicable resolution of the dispute was reached. The centrist Edward Ochab, who enjoyed the full trust of the Kremlin, was elected First Secretary of the Central Committee of the Polish United Workers' Party.

On 18–28 July 1956, during the 7th Plenum of the Central Committee of the Polish United Workers' Party, the Natolinians and the Puławy faction clashed again. The former saw the 1956 Poznań protests as an agent-like and counter-revolutionary action. The Pulawians saw it as a mass protest of an economic nature. The balance of power between the cliques meant that an absurd formula was finally adopted, in which two trends were distinguished in the Poznań protests: a broad, peaceful, mainly workers', which organized a strike and protest march, and a narrower, rebellious, which took up armed struggle. At the same time, mass rallies were ordered, during which party activists were to condemn the Poznań protests. The meetings – against the will of the party leaders – became a forum for discussions on the terrible material situation, shortages of basic food products and other topics.

On 24–26 October 1957, the 10th Plenum of the Central Committee of the Polish United Workers' Party was held. Gomułka indicated revisionism and liquidation as the main source of the party's weakness. In order to heal the party, a resolution was passed to verify its members. All members of the PZPR were to appear before special commissions to determine their ideological stance. As a result of the verification action, which turned out to be the largest purge in the history of the PZPR, by May 1958, 207,000 members (15.5%) of all members and candidates had been excluded from the party. In the 1960s Gomułka supported persecution of the Roman Catholic Church and intellectuals (notably Leszek Kołakowski who was forced into exile). On 4 July 1958, during the meeting of the Secretariat of the Central Committee of the Polish United Workers' Party, a decision was made to send a letter to the executives of the provincial, district and city committees regarding the policy towards the Church. This meant the beginning of a new stage of confrontation with the Church. The July letter warned of an offensive by militant clericalism. On the same day, the Central Committee Commission for Clergy was established in the Central Committee Secretariat, consisting of Zenon Kliszko, Antoni Alster, Władysław Bieńkowski, Tadeusz Galiński, Artur Starewicz, Walenty Titkow, Andrzej Werblan and Stanisław Zawadzki. The post-October liberalization of religious policy turned out to be merely a tactical move.

Initially very popular for his reforms and seeking a "Polish way to socialism", and beginning an era known as Gomułka's thaw, he came under Soviet pressure. Gomułka participated in the Warsaw Pact intervention in Czechoslovakia in 1968. At that time he was also responsible for persecuting students as well as toughening censorship of the media. In 1968, he incited an anti-Zionist propaganda campaign, part of a wider Communist bloc opposition to the Six-Day War.

On 20–22 January 1960, during the 4th Plenum of the Central Committee of the Polish United Workers' Party, many personnel changes were made in the highest positions in the party. Jerzy Morawski's place in the Central Committee secretariat was taken by Ryszard Strzelecki, associated with the Natolinians. Together with him, another experienced Edward Ochab was co-opted to the Central Committee secretariat, already as a full member. The idea of strengthening the power of the party apparatus was returned to by establishing two new departments in the Central Committee - the Department of Science and Education, headed by Andrzej Werblan, and the Department of Culture headed by Wincenty Kraska. The personnel carousel also included several first secretaries of the Central Committee of the Polish United Workers' Party. Additionally, in May that year, Jerzy Albrecht resigned from the position of the Central Committee secretary. This confirmed the direction of staff exchange in key positions by purging the apparatus of active participants in the October changes.

On 4–6 July 1963, the 13th Plenum of the Central Committee of the Polish United Workers' Party was held, devoted to ideological matters. It is considered to be the symbolic end of the process of liberalization of the system in the Gomułka era. During the session, the First Secretary delivered one of the most important speeches in his career. He devoted the report "On the current problems of the ideological work of the party" to policy towards culture, considering that the most important threat on the "cultural front" is revisionism. He condemned the destructive fascination with the West, which was evident among young writers, and criticized the work of radio and television for their tendency towards sterile negation and mindless criticism. Gomułka also presented his vision of conducting historical policy, in which the development of the history of the workers' movement was to occupy a prominent place. He emphasized that the ideological front of the party was insufficiently offensive in the fight against opponents.

On 15–20 June 1964, the 4th Congress of the Polish United Workers' Party took place, which strengthened the so-called small stabilization. Gomułka outlined economic plans for the following years, assuming a 50% increase in industrial production. In the five-year period of 1966–1970, 1.5 million new jobs were to be created, and the national income was to increase by 30%. Gomułka, who was formally re-elected to the position of First Secretary of the Central Committee of the Polish United Workers' Party, sharply criticized the leaders of the Chinese communists for their splitting activities. During the congress, the smell of incense wafted continuously over the conference hall. First secretaries of provincial committees, in particular, blew incense to Gomułka and themselves. The secretary of the Silesian Voivodeship Committee PZPR, Edward Gierek, was the most praised. Two "technocrats" became new members of the Political Bureau: Eugeniusz Szyr and Franciszek Waniolka. At the end of 1964, the PZPR had over 1.6 million members. Over the five years, between the 3rd and 4th Congresses, over 800,000 members and candidates were accepted into the party. At the same time, 150,000 were expelled from the PZPR for lack of activity and violations of party ethics, 33,000 of whom were for various offenses.

On 16–17 May 1967, the 8th Plenum of the Central Committee of the Polish United Workers' Party was held, devoted to "current tasks in the political work of the party". Zenon Kliszko appealed to artists to promote heroes fighting for the victory of socialism and the topics of the "socialist approach to work".

On 8–9 July 1968, the 12th Plenum of the Central Committee of the Polish United Workers' Party was held, devoted to assessing the events of the past. As a sign of protest against the antisemitic campaign, Edward Ochab resigned from his mandate as a member of the Political Bureau and the Central Committee. On November 11–16 of that year, the 5th Congress of the Polish United Workers' Party was held with the participation of Leonid Brezhnev, Walter Ulbricht and Todor Zhivkov. Brezhnev presented the principles of Soviet foreign policy, assuming the Brezhnev Doctrine. The 5th Congress brought many changes in the highest positions in the party, introducing a group of young generation activists to the ruling elite. A total of 25 new members joined the Central Committee. The expected assault on the positions of Mieczysław Moczar's "Partisans", the Endo-Communist faction of the PZPR, did not take place. He himself only retained the position of deputy member of the Political Bureau of the Central Committee of the Polish United Workers' Party and secretary of the Central Committee, which was interpreted as an affront. He had already taken these positions in July in exchange for the position of head of the Ministry of Internal Affairs, which Gomułka filled with his associate, Kazimierz Świtała.

On 18 June 1969, during a meeting of the Central Committee of Party Control, its chairman Zenon Nowak informed that 1968 was a record year in terms of the number of new candidates to the Polish United Workers' Party. A total of 213 thousand people were accepted, and this result was only improved after 10 years. By 31 December 1968, the PZPR had 2.1 million members and candidates, and since 1956 its numbers had increased by 700,000.

In December 1970, a bloody clash with shipyard workers in which several dozen workers were fatally shot forced his resignation (officially for health reasons; he had in fact suffered a stroke). A dynamic younger man, Edward Gierek, took over the Party leadership and tensions eased.

=== Gierek's rule ===
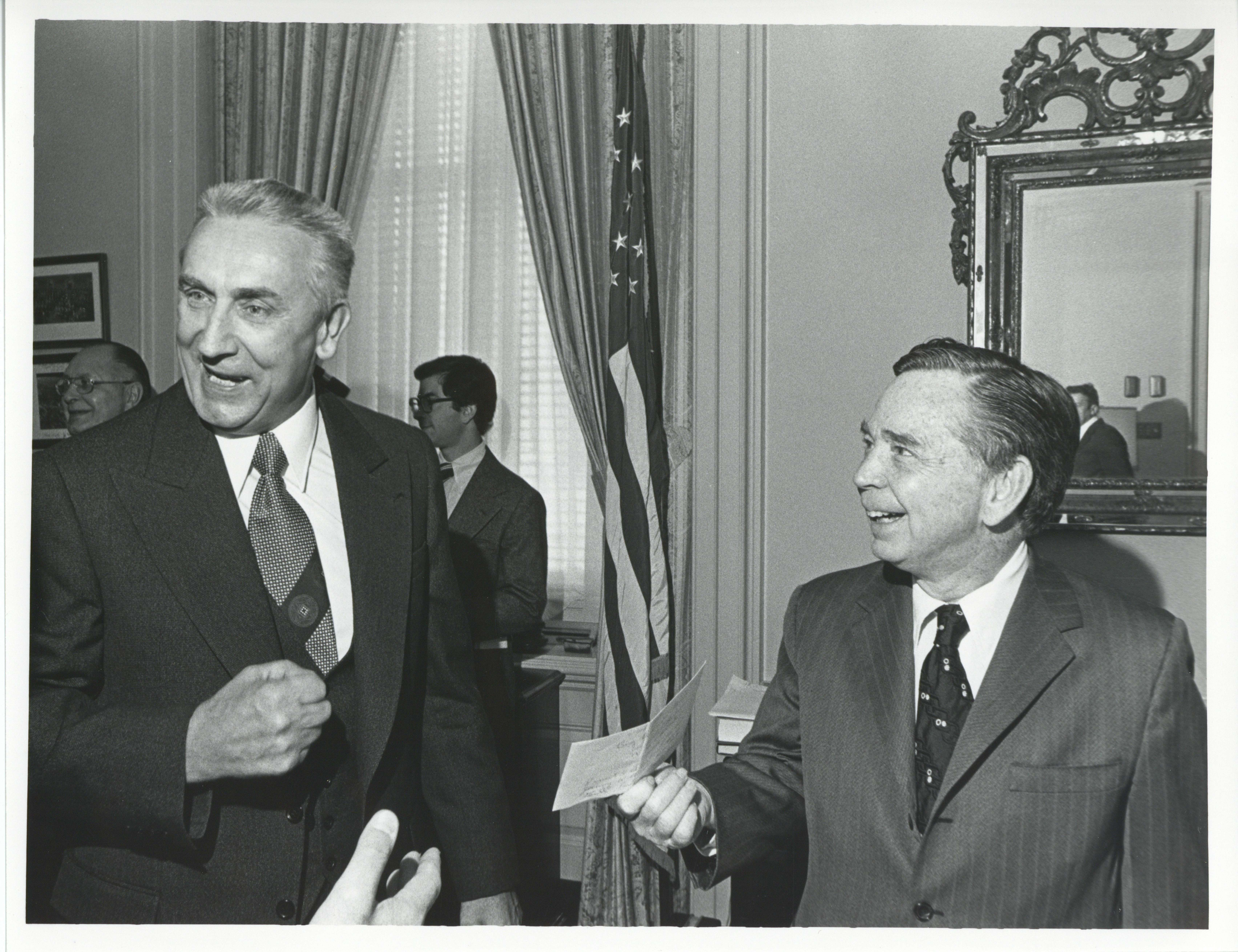
First Secretary of PZPR Edward Gierek (left) with Speaker of the House of Representatives Carl Albert (right), Washington D.C., 1974

In the late 1960s, Edward Gierek had created a personal power base and become the recognized leader of the young technocrat faction of the party. When rioting over economic conditions broke out in late 1970, Gierek replaced Gomułka as party first secretary. Gierek promised economic reform and instituted a program to modernize industry and increase the availability of consumer goods, doing so mostly through foreign loans. His good relations with Western politicians, especially France's Valéry Giscard d'Estaing and West Germany's Helmut Schmidt, were a catalyst for his receiving western aid and loans.

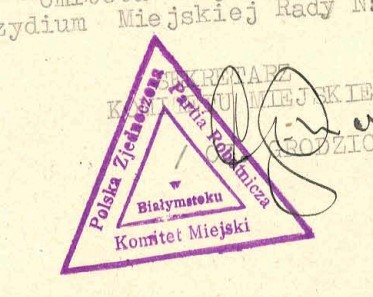
Seal of Białystok city committee of the PZPR on official document, 1949

On 6–11 December 1971, the 6th Congress of the Polish United Workers' Party was held (for the first time the television broadcast of its proceedings took place using color broadcasting), attended by 1,804 delegates representing a million members of communist parties. Delegations from 70 such parties arrived. During the congress the program of "dynamic development" and "building socialism in Poland" was adopted. At the same time, a generational change took place in the authorities of the Polish United Workers' Party. The old generation, active in the period of the Second Polish Republic in the Communist Party of Poland and later in the Polish Workers' Party, died. The positions were taken by "youth" who began their careers in the Stalinist Union of Polish Youth. Unable to refer to the condemned times of Gomułka, they reached for the tradition of the fifties, glorifying people from that period such as Bierut and Rokosowski, a situation which led to the decade of the seventies being sometimes called "Stalinism without terror". Gierek strengthened his position by filling the Political Bureau with his supporters. Besides himself, Edward Babiuch, Henryk Jablonski, Mieczyslaw Jagielski, Jaroszewicz, Jaruzelski, Wladyslaw Kruczek, Stefan Olszowski, Franciszek Szlachic, Jan Szydlak and Jozef Tejchma became members of the Political Bureau.

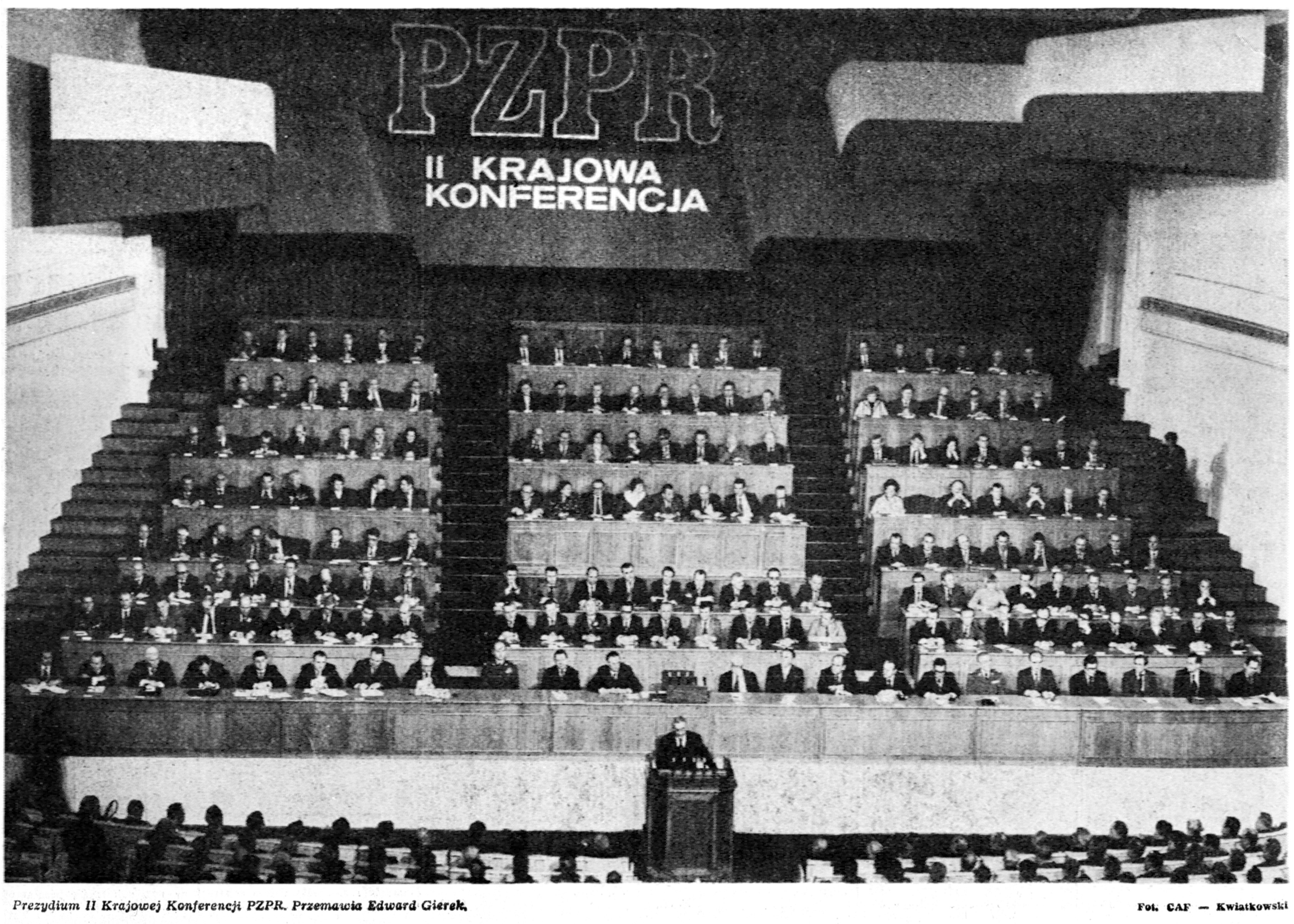
Second National Conference of the PZPR in 1978

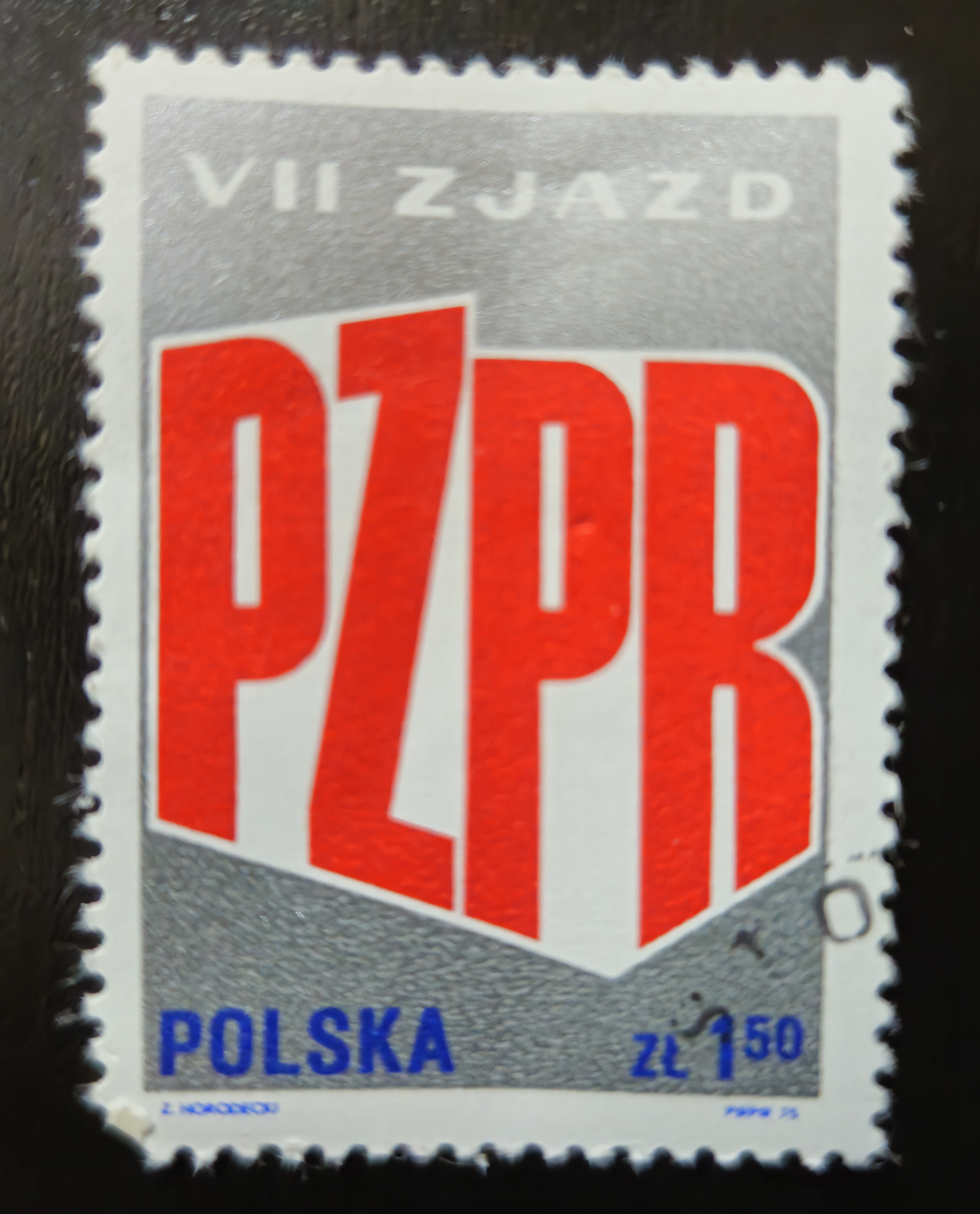
A postage stamp with the theme of the 7th Congress of the Polish United Workers' Party

This short-term development was accompanied by a careful policy of indoctrination and total ordering of the society of the PZPR, whose institutional and ideological monopoly was expanded throughout the decade. The ranks of the PZPR grew rapidly: in 1970 it had 2.3 million members, the party was the price paid for promotions, careers, and its activists gained the title of "owners of the PRL". Many of the changes that were made had Soviet patterns, which Gierek did not hide, proclaiming that "our party's place is with the Communist Party of the Soviet Union, the place of the People's Republic of Poland - with the Soviet Union". It began with securing the interests of the party apparatus. In the autumn of 1972, the State Council issued decrees that privileged people holding the highest positions in the state and their families in terms of remuneration. At that time, the Political Bureau of the Central Committee of the Polish United Workers' Party issued "guidelines" regarding the nomenclature of management staff, which by the end of the decade included half a million people. Its existence and functioning proved the party's total monopoly, and at the same time exposed the superficiality of the state, administrative and scientific structures operating in the Polish People's Republic. Detailed lists included positions whose appointment was dependent on the "recommendation" of a given party body - from the Political Bureau to the city and district committees. PZPR (including directors of factories, schools, presidents of cooperatives, agricultural circles, social organizations). The unification of the youth movement and changes in the education system were elements of subordinating society to communist ideology.

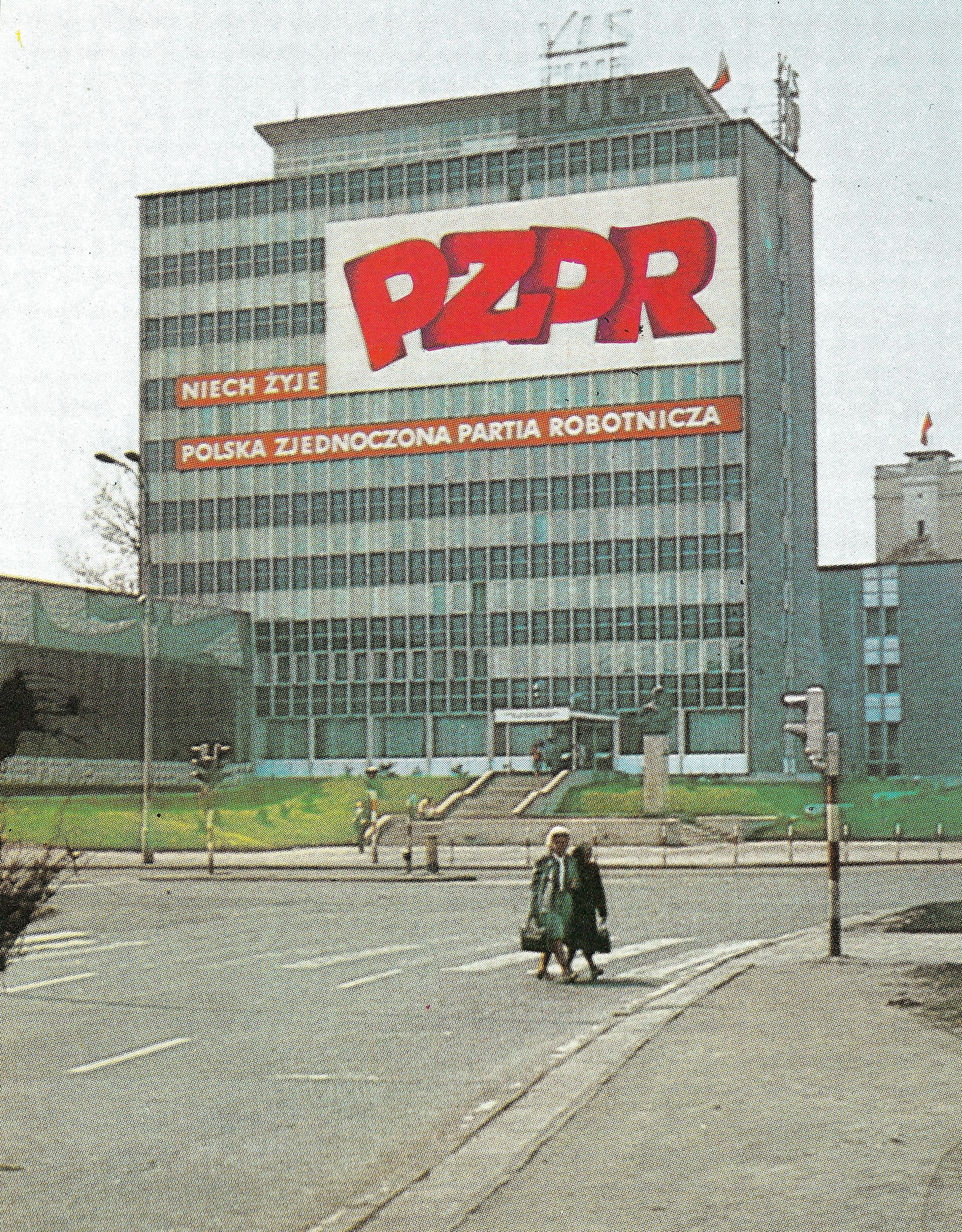
Party banner on the facade of an office building of Fabryki Wyrobów Precyzyjnych im. gen. Świerczewskiego at 29/31 Kasprzaka Street in Warsaw

In the spring of 1973, the Federation of Socialist Unions of Polish Youth was established, an organization operating under the leadership of PZPR, whose goal was to indoctrinate youth in the spirit of Marxist ideology. In 1974, the Institute of Basic Problems of Marxism-Leninism was established at the Central Committee of PZPR in order to educate party apparatchiks. Unification and centralization also included economic and cooperative structures, including the establishment of the RSW "Prasa-Książka-Ruch" concern, a powerful machine financing the activities of PZPR. Already in the early 1970s, the PZPR leadership had been considering changes to the constitution. They were approved by the Sejm of the Polish People's Republic in February 1976. The main program, "Dziennik Telewizyjny", almost every edition of which began with the words "First Secretary of PZPR...", broadcasts from party conferences or information about exceeded plans or completed construction or party activities.

On 4 February 1974, at the 1st National Conference of the Polish United Workers' Party, a "great and universal action of working people undertaken for the purpose of educating the 30th anniversary of the People's Republic of Poland" was initiated. Reports of increased production and coal mining began to arrive from all over the country. However, the quality of life did not improve. On 15 February of that year, the 13th Plenum of the Central Committee was held, devoted to the topic of "Ideological and educational tasks of the party in the celebration of the 30th anniversary of the People's Republic of Poland". During the meeting, Wincenty Kraska and Andrzej Werblan were elected secretaries of the Central Committee of the Polish United Workers' Party, while Kazimierz Barcikowski, recommended for the position of Minister of Agriculture, was dismissed from this position. The following day, it was announced that Józef Tejchma had been appointed Minister of Culture and Art, while retaining his position as vice-president of the Council of Ministers. A few days later, Józef Pinkowski was dismissed from the position of Deputy Chairman of the Planning Commission at the Council of Ministers, taking up the position of secretary of the Central Committee of the Polish United Workers' Party.

The 7th Congress of the Polish United Workers' Party took place on 8–12 December 1975. Among the guests was Leonid Brezhnev, for who arrived to the newly opened Warszawa Centralna railway station. Gierek delivered the programmatic report of the Political Bureau "for further dynamic development of socialist construction - for higher quality of work and living conditions of the nation". After the congress, Gierek remained at the head of the Central Committee of the Polish United Workers' Party; a ceremonial concert for the leaders of the Polish United Workers' Party and delegates took place in the Grand Theatre. Among others, the Central Artistic Ensemble of the Polish Army performed, presenting a ballet version of "Capriccio" by Krzysztof Penderecki.

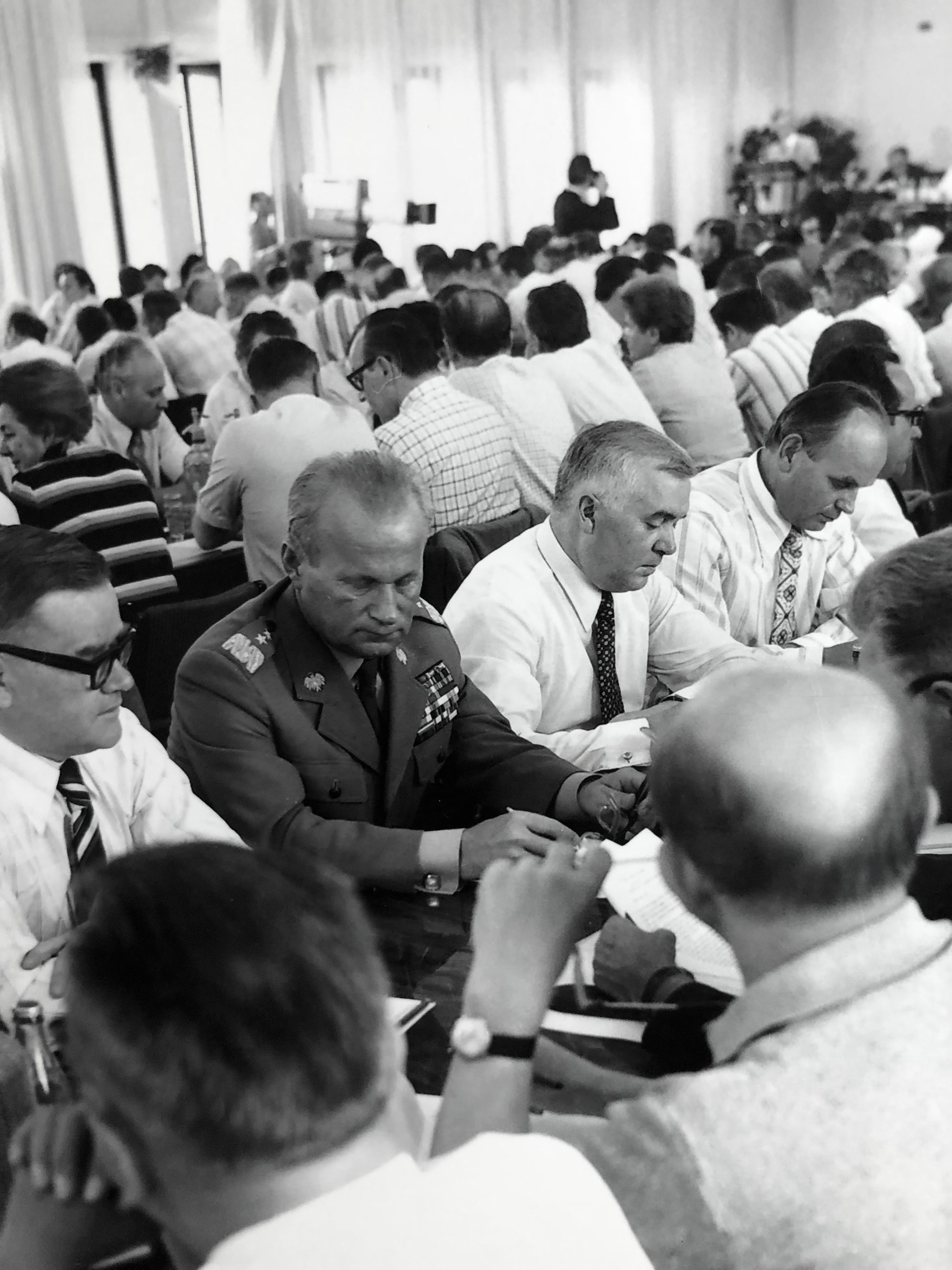
Session of the party Central Committee, December 1975

On 1–2 December 1976, the 5th Plenum of the Central Committee of the Polish United Workers' Party met under the slogan "For consistent implementation of the socio-economic program of the 7th Congress of the Polish United Workers' Party, for higher efficiency of management". Stefan Olszowski and Alojzy Karkoszka were appointed as secretaries.

On 9–10 January 1978, the 2nd National Conference of the Polish United Workers' Party met under the slogan "For consistent implementation of the program of improving the quality of work and living conditions, for further strengthening of the leading party's power and deepening the moral and political unity of the nation".

The standard of living improved in Poland in the early 1970s, the economy, however, began to falter during the 1973 oil crisis, and by 1976 price hikes became necessary. New protests broke out in June 1976, and although they were forcibly suppressed, the planned price increases were suspended. High foreign debts, food shortages, and an outmoded industrial base compelled a new round of economic reforms in 1980. Once again, price increases set off protests across the country, especially in the Gdańsk Shipyard and Szczecin Shipyard. Gierek was forced to grant legal status to Solidarity and to concede the right to strike. (Gdańsk Agreement).

On 9–10 June 1981, amidst much social and economic unrest, the IX Plenum of the Central Committee of the Polish United Workers' Party convened, under an attack by the "concrete", demanding a change of leadership to a more decisive one. Under the influence of the Soviet letter, Kania also hardened his position. On 14–20 July, the IX Extraordinary Congress of the Polish United Workers' Party was held (over 350 thousand members left the party during the year), at which Stanisław Kania was re-elected First Secretary (for the first time in the history of the Polish People's Republic in a democratic manner). He received 1,311 votes against 568 cast for Kazimierz Barcikowski. Only 4 of its previous members (Jaruzelski, Barcikowski, Olszowski, Kania) joined the new politburo. The congress was a defeat for both the reformers and the "concrete". Many new supporters found themselves in the authorities - Jaruzelski, who had been prime minister since February 1981, gained support; many representatives of the army, which was gaining more and more influence, were also elected. Gierek, Babiuch, Lukaszewicz, Pyka, Szydlak and Żandarowski were ousted from the PZPR.

Kania admitted that the party had made many economic mistakes, and advocated working with Catholic and trade unionist opposition groups. He met with Solidarity leader Lech Wałęsa, and other critics of the party. Though Kania agreed with his predecessors that the Communist Party must maintain control of Poland, he never assured the Soviets that Poland would not pursue actions independent of the Soviet Union. On 18 October 1981, the Central Committee of the Party withdrew confidence in him, and Kania was replaced by Prime Minister (and Minister of Defence) Gen. Wojciech Jaruzelski.

=== Jaruzelski's martial law ===
PZPR's newspaper "Trybuna Ludu" issue 13 December 1981 reports martial law in Poland.

On 11 February 1981, Jaruzelski was elected Prime Minister of Poland. On 16–18 October 1981, at the IV Plenum of the Central Committee of the Polish United Workers' Party, the First Secretary, Stanislaw Kania, resigned, and the Central Committee, by a vote of 180–4, elected Wojciech Jaruzelski as his successor, as Prime Minister and Minister of National Defence, and now the First Secretary has all the power in his hands. The number of military personnel in the highest authorities of the Polish United Workers' Party and the administration has been growing.

Before initiating the plan of suppressing Solidarity, he presented it to Soviet Premier, Nikolai Tikhonov. On 13 December 1981, Jaruzelski imposed martial law in Poland.

In 1982, Jaruzelski revitalized the Front of National Unity, the organization the Communists used to manage their satellite parties, as the Patriotic Movement for National Rebirth.

In 1985, Jaruzelski resigned as prime minister and defence minister and became chairman of the Polish Council of State, a post equivalent to that of president, with his power centered on and firmly entrenched in his coterie of "LWP" generals and lower rank officers of the Polish People's Army.

On 20–21 December 1988, the first part of the 10th Plenum of the PZPR Central Committee took place, but then the sessions were interrupted until mid-January. Jaruzelski, preparing an operation to win over some of the opposition as jointly responsible for the terrible state of the country, removed six activists from the fifteen-member Political Bureau of the Central Committee, considered to be "hardliners", i.e. those opposed to the planned talks at the Round Table. Janusz Reykowski, among others, was promoted to the Political Bureau of the Central Committee.

On 16–18 January 1989, the second part of the 10th Plenum of the PZPR Central Committee took place. In the face of the statements criticizing the plan of agreement with the opposition, among which Miodowicz's statements were among the harshest, Jaruzelski threatened his own resignation, as well as the resignation of Prime Minister Rakowski, Ministers Kiszczak and Siwicki, and members of the Political Bureau - Czyrek and Barcikowski. In this situation, opponents of the Round Table, who had neither a ready plan of action nor a significant leader, gave up further resistance. The regime used this incident to its own ends and two days later Ciosek, in a conversation with Mazowiecki and Father Orszulik, presented the dispute at the Central Committee session as a dangerous attempt at a coup aimed at restoring the rule of an iron fist. In this way, the PZPR leadership suggested to the opposition not to set too high demands, because Jaruzelski's "reformist" team could be replaced by party dogmatists.

==== Breakdown of autocracy ====
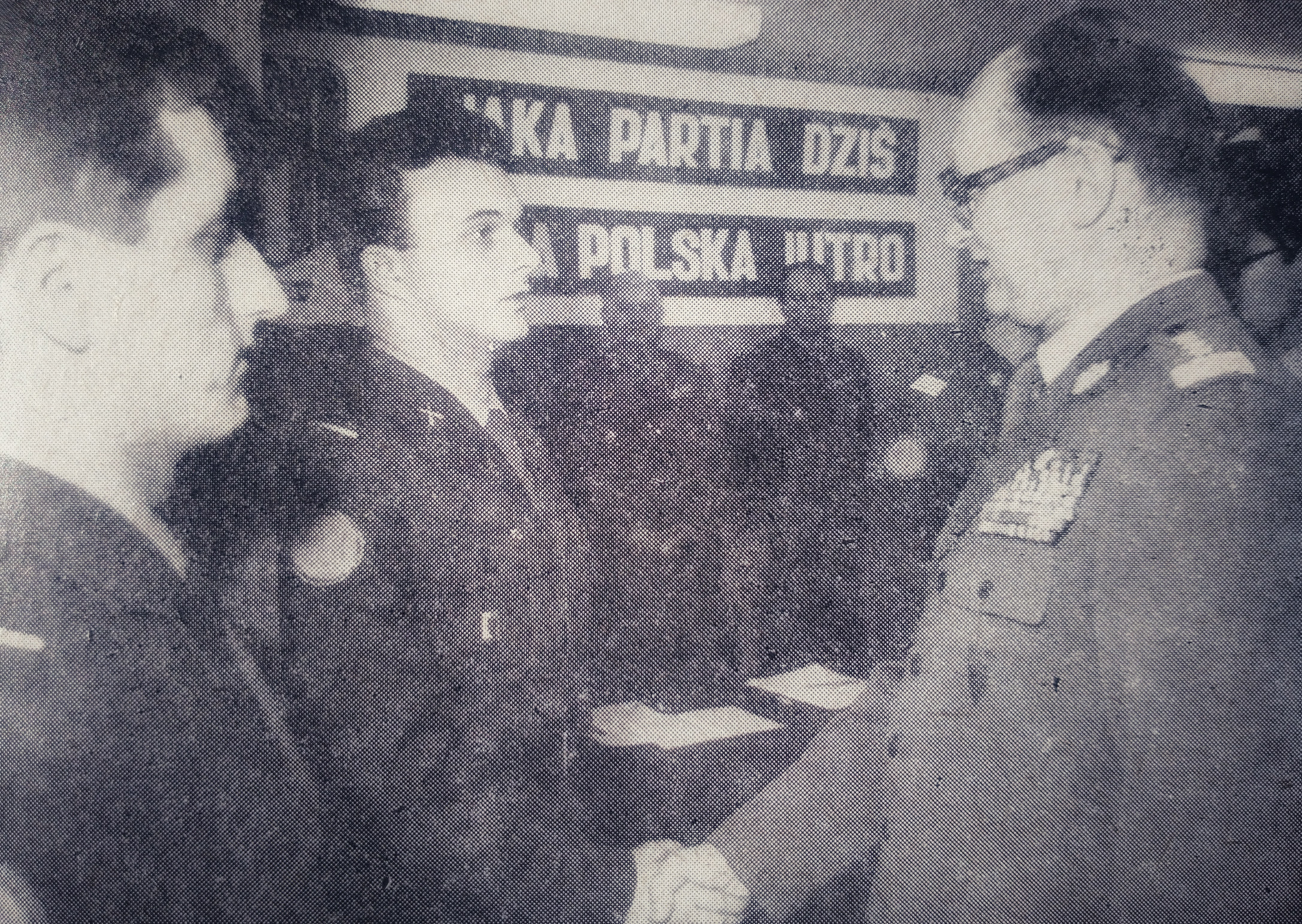
Awarding of party membership booklets by Jaruzelski, 1986

The attempt to impose a naked military dictatorship notwithstanding, the policies of Mikhail Gorbachev stimulated political reform in Poland. By the close of the tenth plenary session in December 1988, the Polish United Workers' Party was forced, after strikes, to approach leaders of Solidarity for talks.

From 6 February to 15 April 1989, negotiations were held between 13 working groups during 94 sessions of the roundtable talks.

These negotiations resulted in an agreement that stated that a great degree of political power would be given to a newly created bicameral legislature. It also created a new post of president to act as head of state and chief executive. Solidarity was also declared a legal organization. During the following Polish elections the Communists won 65 percent of the seats in the Sejm, though the seats won were guaranteed and the Communists were unable to gain a majority, while 99 out of the 100 seats in the Senate — all freely contested — were won by Solidarity-backed candidates. Jaruzelski won the presidential ballot by one vote.

Jaruzelski was unsuccessful in convincing Wałęsa to include Solidarity in a "grand coalition" with the Communists and resigned his position of general secretary of the Polish United Workers' Party. The PZPR' two allied parties broke their long-standing alliance, forcing Jaruzelski to appoint Solidarity's Tadeusz Mazowiecki as the country's first non-communist prime minister since 1948. Jaruzelski resigned as Poland's president in 1990, being succeeded by Wałęsa in December.

=== Dissolution of the PZPR ===
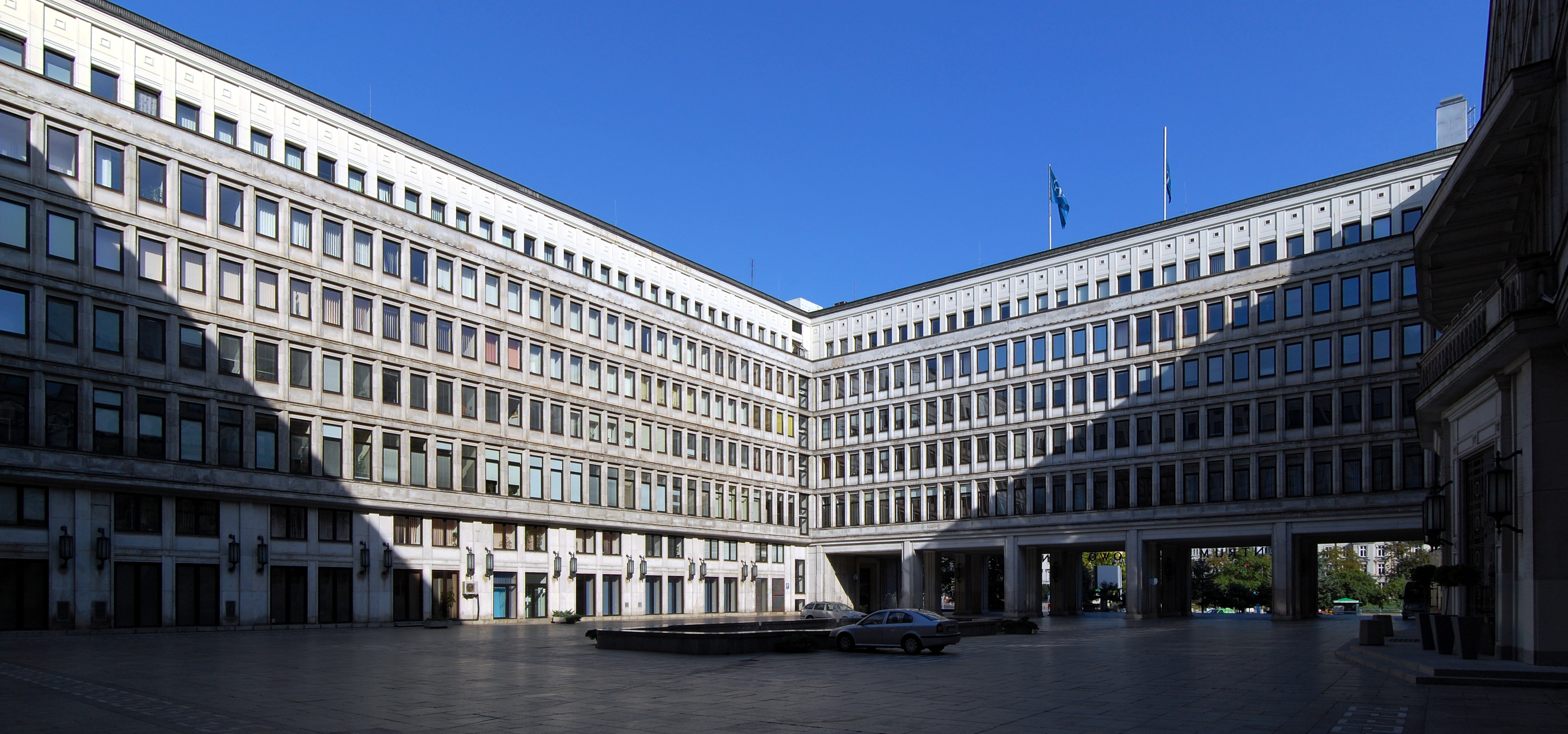
Dom Partii building in Warsaw, former headquarters of PZPR

Starting in January 1990, the collapse of the PZPR became inevitable. All over the country, public occupations of the party buildings started in order to prevent stealing the party's possessions and destroying or taking the archives. On 29 January 1990, the XI Congress was held, which was supposed to recreate the party. Finally, the PZPR dissolved, and some of its members decided to establish two new social-democratic parties. They got over $1 million from the Communist Party of the Soviet Union known as the Moscow loan. Of this, $300,000 was spent to set up Trybuna, a left-wing newspaper, $200,000 on severance pay for employees of PUWP, $500,000 given back to the Russians, and $200,000 circulated to pay off the loan in installments.

The former activists of the PZPR established the Social Democracy of the Republic of Poland (in Polish: Socjaldemokracja Rzeczypospolitej Polskiej, SdRP), of which the main organizers were Leszek Miller and Mieczysław Rakowski. The SdRP was supposed (among other things) to take over all rights and duties of the PZPR, and help to divide out the property. Up to the end of the 1980s, it had considerable incomes mainly from managed properties and from the RSW company 'Press- Book-Traffic', which in turn had special tax concessions. During this period, the income from membership fees constituted only 30% of the PZPR's revenues. After the dissolution of the Polish United Workers' Party and the establishment of the SdRP, the rest of the activists formed the Social Democratic Union of the Republic of Poland (USdRP), which changed its name to the Polish Social Democratic Union, and The 8th July Movement. The Moscow loan caused controversy in Polish politics and occasioned a year-long prosecution effort. In the end nobody was sentenced.

At the end of 1990, there was an intense debate in the Sejm on the takeover of the wealth that belonged to the former PZPR. Over 3000 buildings and premises were included in the wealth and almost half of it was used without legal basis. Supporters of the acquisition argued that the wealth was built on the basis of plunder and the Treasury grant collected by the whole society. Opponents of SdRP claimed that the wealth was created from membership fees; therefore, they demanded wealth inheritance for SdPR which at that time administered the wealth. Personal property and the accounts of the former PZPR were not subject to control of a parliamentary committee.

On 9 November 1990, the Sejm passed "The resolution about the acquisition of the wealth that belonged to the former PZPR". This resolution was supposed to result in a final takeover of the PZPR real estate by the Treasury. As a result, only a part of the real estate was taken over mainly for a local government by 1992, whereas a legal dispute over the other party carried on till 2000. Personal property and finances of the former PZPR practically disappeared. According to the declaration of SdRP Members of Parliament, 90–95% of the party's wealth was allocated for gratuity or was donated for social assistance.

== Structure ==
The highest statutory authority of the Voivodeship party organization was the voivodeship conference, and in the period between conferences – the PZPR voivodeship committee. To drive current party work, the provincial committee chose the executive. Voivodeship conferences convened a provincial committee in consultation with the Central Committee of PZPR – formally at least once in year. Plenary meetings of the Voivodeship committee were to be convened at least every two months and executive meetings – once a week.

In practice, the frequency of holding provincial conferences and plenary meetings KW deviated from the statutory standards were held less often. Dates and basic Topics of session of Voivodeship party conferences and plenary sessions of Voivodeship Committee PZPR in the provinces of Poland were generally correlated with dates and topics of plenary sessions Central Committee of the PZPR. They were devoted mainly to "transferring" resolutions and decisions of the Central Committee to the provincial party organization. The provincial committee had no freedom in shaping the original, its own meeting plan. The initiative could be demonstrated – in accordance with the principle of democratic centralism – only in the implementation of resolutions and orders of instances supreme.

The dependence of the Voivodeship party organization and its authorities was also determined by that its activity was financed almost entirely from a subsidy received from the Central Committee of PZPR. Membership fees constituted no more than 10% of revenues. The activities of the Voivodeship Committee between PZPR Voivodeship conferences were formally controlled by the Audit Committee (elected during these conferences). Initially only examined the budget implementation and accounting of PZPR Voivodeship Committee. In the following years, the scope of its activities was expanded, including control over the management of party membership cards, security OF confidential documents, how to deal with complaints and complaints addressed to the party. The number of inspections carried out grew systematically, and the work of committees accepted more planned and formalized character.

== Building ==
The Central Committee had its seat in the Party's House, a building erected by obligatory subscription from 1948 to 1952 and colloquially called White House or the House of Sheep. Since 1991 the Bank-Financial Center "New World" is located in this building. Between 1991 and 2000, the Warsaw Stock Exchange also had its seat there.

== Party leaders ==
By the year 1954 the head of the party was the Chair of Central Committee:

#	Name	Picture	Took office	Left office	Notes
1	Bolesław Bierut (1892–1956)		22 December 1948	12 March 1956	General Secretary
2	Edward Ochab (1906–1989)		20 March 1956	21 October 1956	First Secretary
3	Władysław Gomułka (1905–1982)		21 October 1956	20 December 1970	First Secretary
4	Edward Gierek (1913–2001)		20 December 1970	6 September 1980	First Secretary
5	Stanisław Kania (1927–2020)		6 September 1980	18 October 1981	First Secretary
6	Wojciech Jaruzelski (1923–2014)		18 October 1981	29 July 1989	First Secretary
7	Mieczysław Rakowski (1926–2008)		29 July 1989	29 January 1990	First Secretary

== Leading figures ==
- Edward Babiuch
- Kazimierz Barcikowski
- Jakub Berman
- Józef Cyrankiewicz
- Janina Dziarnowska
- Mieczysław Jagielski
- Piotr Jaroszewicz
- Stefan Jędrychowski
- Aleksander Kwaśniewski
- Zenon Kliszko
- Stanisław Kociołek
- Zbigniew Messner
- Leszek Miller
- Hilary Minc
- Mieczysław Moczar
- Zenon Nowak
- Józef Oleksy
- Stefan Olszowski
- Józef Pińkowski
- Stanisław Radkiewicz
- Adam Schaff
- Roman Zambrowski
- Aleksander Zawadzki

== Notable politicians after 1989 ==
=== Presidents ===
- Wojciech Jaruzelski
- Aleksander Kwaśniewski

=== Prime ministers ===
- Józef Oleksy
- Włodzimierz Cimoszewicz
- Leszek Miller
- Marek Belka

=== European Commissioners ===
- Danuta Hübner

== Electoral history ==
=== Sejm elections ===
Election	Party leader	Votes	%	Seats	+/−	Position
1952	Bolesław Bierut	as part of FJN – PZPR		273 / 425	New	1st
1957	Władysław Gomułka	as part of FJN – PZPR		239 / 459	▼34	1st
1961	Władysław Gomułka	as part of FJN – PZPR		256 / 460	▲17	1st
1965	Władysław Gomułka	as part of FJN – PZPR		255 / 460	▼1	1st
1969	Władysław Gomułka	as part of FJN – PZPR		255 / 460	Steady	1st
1972	Edward Gierek	as part of FJN – PZPR		255 / 460	Steady	1st
1976	Edward Gierek	as part of FJN – PZPR		261 / 460	▲6	1st
1980	Edward Gierek	as part of FJN – PZPR		261 / 460	Steady	1st
1985	Wojciech Jaruzelski	as part of PRON		245 / 460	▼16	1st
1989	Wojciech Jaruzelski	22,734,348 (constituencies) (Note: The electoral law for the 1989 election reserved constituency seats for each of the PRON's individual member parties separately, and for independent and opposition party candidates as a whole; PZPR candidates could only run in the seats reserved for PZPR. This number of votes reflects the total number of votes cast in PZPR's reserved seats.)	N/A	173 / 460	▼72	1st
1989	Wojciech Jaruzelski	132,845,385 (in the national list) (Note: The electoral law for the 1989 election provided for a national list of prominent PRON figures; voters voted on approving or rejecting each candidate on the national list separately. Of the 35 national list candidates, 17 were nominated by PZPR.)	45.82% (Note: 17,053,171 votes were cast in the election of National list members; since voters voted on each candidate separately, and there were 17 PZPR candidates on the national list, 289,903,907 marks the maximum number of approval votes PZPR's national list candidates could have received.)	173 / 460	▼72	1st

== See also ==
- Politburo of the Polish United Workers' Party
- List of Polish United Workers' Party members
- Eastern Bloc politics
- Communist Party of Poland (1918 – 1938)
- Polish Communist Party (2002) – receiver with 2002 year
