= 1961 Polish parliamentary election =

- 16 April 1961

All 460 seats in the Sejm
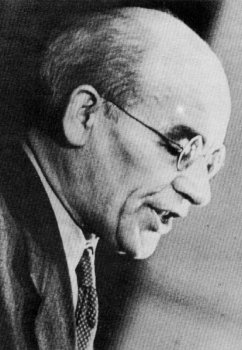
| | First party |
|---|---|
| Leader | Władysław Gomułka |
| Party | PZPR |
| Alliance | FJN |
| Seats won | 460 |
| Seat change | ▲1 |
Premier before election
Józef Cyrankiewicz
PZPR
New Premier
Józef Cyrankiewicz
PZPR

Parliamentary elections were held in Poland on 16 April 1961. They were the third elections to the Sejm, the parliament of the People's Republic of Poland, and fourth in Communist Poland.

== Background ==
The 1961 elections followed the liberalized rules prepared for those in 1957, but compared to the situation five years ago, the Polish society was much more apathetic and disappointed with the government. The elections, as all the others under the communist regimes in Poland, were not free and the results of the 1961 elections are considered to be falsified, again a common occurrence of that time.

The electoral system was very similar to that in East Germany where ostensibly multiple parties were present, but their involvement was tempered by mandatory membership of a "unity list" which was ever loyal to the communist hegemony. In practice, electors only had the choice to approve or disapprove the lists, rather than genuinely get to pick their preferred candidate. There were independents; however, they would get elected only if the majority of voters in a multi-member electorate voted against the official list. Additionally, those who were allowed to register and run as independents had to go through an approval process, which invariably rejected any who were too oppositional. Although there was no blatant falsification like ballot stuffing or overt intimidation of voters who turned out, historiographers of Polish history invariably consider these elections to have been fraudulent - due to the above peculiarities.

== Results ==
The official results were a turnout of 95%, while the communist parties' list prepared by Front of National Unity received 98% of the vote. 460 members were elected, 256 from Polish United Workers' Party (PZPR), 117 from United People's Party (ZSL), 39 from the Democratic Party (SD), 48 independents (the majority of whom were "Social independents", as well as several "Catholic independents" from the Znak association). However, as the other parties and "independents" were subordinate to PZPR, its control of the Sejm was total.

| Party or alliance | | Votes | % | Seats | +/– |
|---|---|---|---|---|---|
| Front of National Unity | Polish United Workers' Party | 17,342,570 | 98.34 | 256 | +17 |
| Front of National Unity | United People's Party | 17,342,570 | 98.34 | 117 | –1 |
| Front of National Unity | Democratic Party | 17,342,570 | 98.34 | 39 | 0 |
| Front of National Unity | Independents | 17,342,570 | 98.34 | 48 | –15 |
| Blank ballots | | 292,009 | 1.66 | – | – |
| Total | | 17,634,579 | 100.00 | 460 | +1 |
| Valid votes | | 17,634,579 | 99.89 | | |
| Invalid votes | | 19,067 | 0.11 | | |
| Total votes | | 17,653,646 | 100.00 | | |
| Registered voters/turnout | | 18,615,185 | 94.83 | | |
Source: Nohlen & Stöver

== See also ==
- Sejm of the Polish People's Republic
- Polish United Workers' Party
- United People's Party (Poland)
- Alliance of Democrats (Poland)
- History of Poland (1945–1989)
- People's Republic of Poland
