= Front of National Unity =

National Unity Front Front Jedności Narodu
- Abbreviation: FJN
- First leader: Bolesław Bierut
- Last leader: Henryk Jabłoński
- Founded: 1947 (as Democratic Bloc)
- Dissolved: 1983
- Succeeded by: Patriotic Movement for National Rebirth
- Ideology: Communism; Marxism–Leninism; Endo-Communism; Stalinism (until 1956)
- Political position: Far-left
- Colors: Red

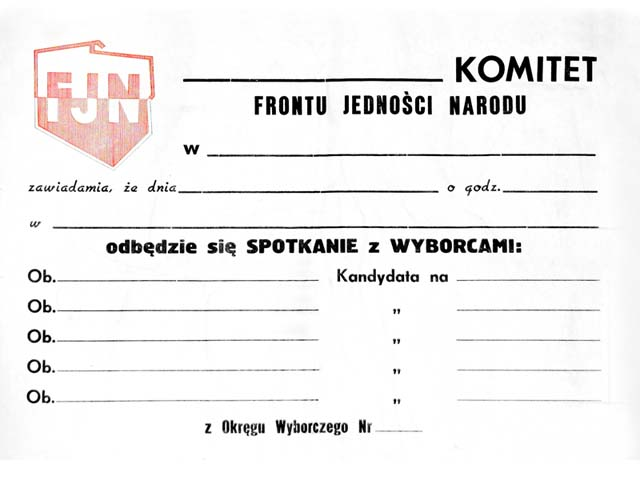
FNU election poster from mid 1970s.

Front of National Unity or National Unity Front (Polish: Front Jedności Narodu, FJN) was a popular front supervising elections in the Polish People's Republic which also acted as a coalition for the dominant communist Polish United Workers' Party (PZPR) and its allies. It was founded in 1952 as National Front (Front Narodowy) and renamed to Front of National Unity in 1956. It was the heir of the Democratic Bloc (Blok Demokratyczny) which ran in the elections of 1947 before the merger between communists and socialists.

The Front was created by and was subordinate to the PZPR. Its membership included all three legal Polish political parties (the PZPR, Democratic Party, and United People's Party) and many organizations (such as trade unions). During elections it had a near monopoly (varied depending on particular time) on registering candidates who had the right to participate in the elections. As was the case with other popular fronts in the Soviet bloc, the member parties of the Front were largely subservient to the PZPR; they had to accept the PZPR's "leading role" as a condition of their existence.

On 16 July 1983 at a meeting in Warsaw of the presidium of the National Committee of the Front of National Unity, the dissolution of that organization was announced and an appeal was made for FJN members to join the Patriotic Movement for National Rebirth (Patriotyczny Ruch Odrodzenia Narodowego, PRON).

== Leaders ==
- Bolesław Bierut (1947–1956)
- Aleksander Zawadzki (1956–1964)
- Edward Ochab (1965–1968)
- Janusz Groszkowski (1971–1976)
- Henryk Jabłoński (1976–1983)

== Electoral history ==
=== Sejm elections ===
| Election | Votes | % | Seats | +/– | Position | Government |
|---|---|---|---|---|---|---|
| 1947 | 9,003,682 | 80.1% | 394 / 444 | ▲394 | ▲1st | Super-majority |
| 1952 | 15,459,849 | 99.8% | 425 / 425 | ▲31 | 1st | Sole legal coalition |
| 1957 | 16,563,314 | 98.4% | 459 / 459 | ▲34 | 1st | Sole legal coalition |
| 1961 | 17,342,570 | 98.3% | 460 / 460 | ▲1 | 1st | Sole legal coalition |
| 1965 | 18,742,152 | 98.8% | 460 / 460 | Steady | 1st | Sole legal coalition |
| 1969 | 20,473,114 | 99.2% | 460 / 460 | Steady | 1st | Sole legal coalition |
| 1972 | 21,746,242 | 99.5% | 460 / 460 | Steady | 1st | Sole legal coalition |
| 1976 | 23,502,983 | 99.4% | 460 / 460 | Steady | 1st | Sole legal coalition |
| 1980 | 24,683,056 | 99.5% | 460 / 460 | Steady | 1st | Sole legal coalition |
