= 1952 Polish parliamentary election =

- 26 October 1952

All 425 seats in the Sejm
- Turnout: 95.03%
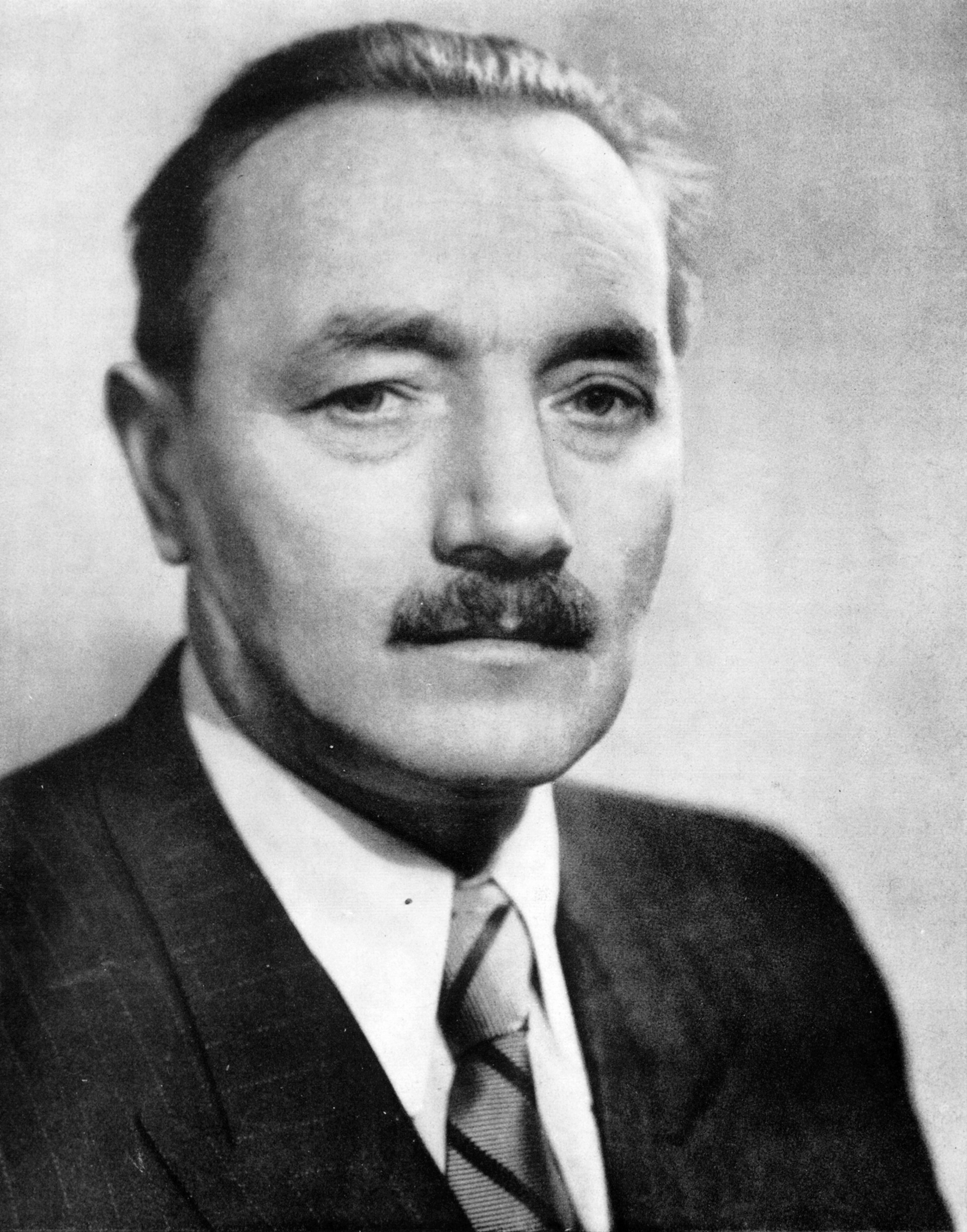

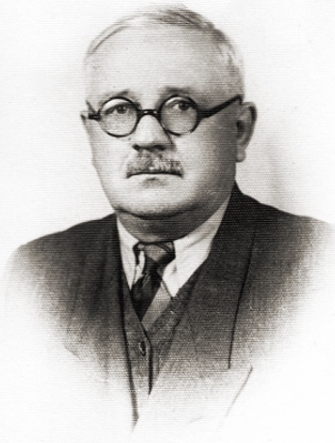

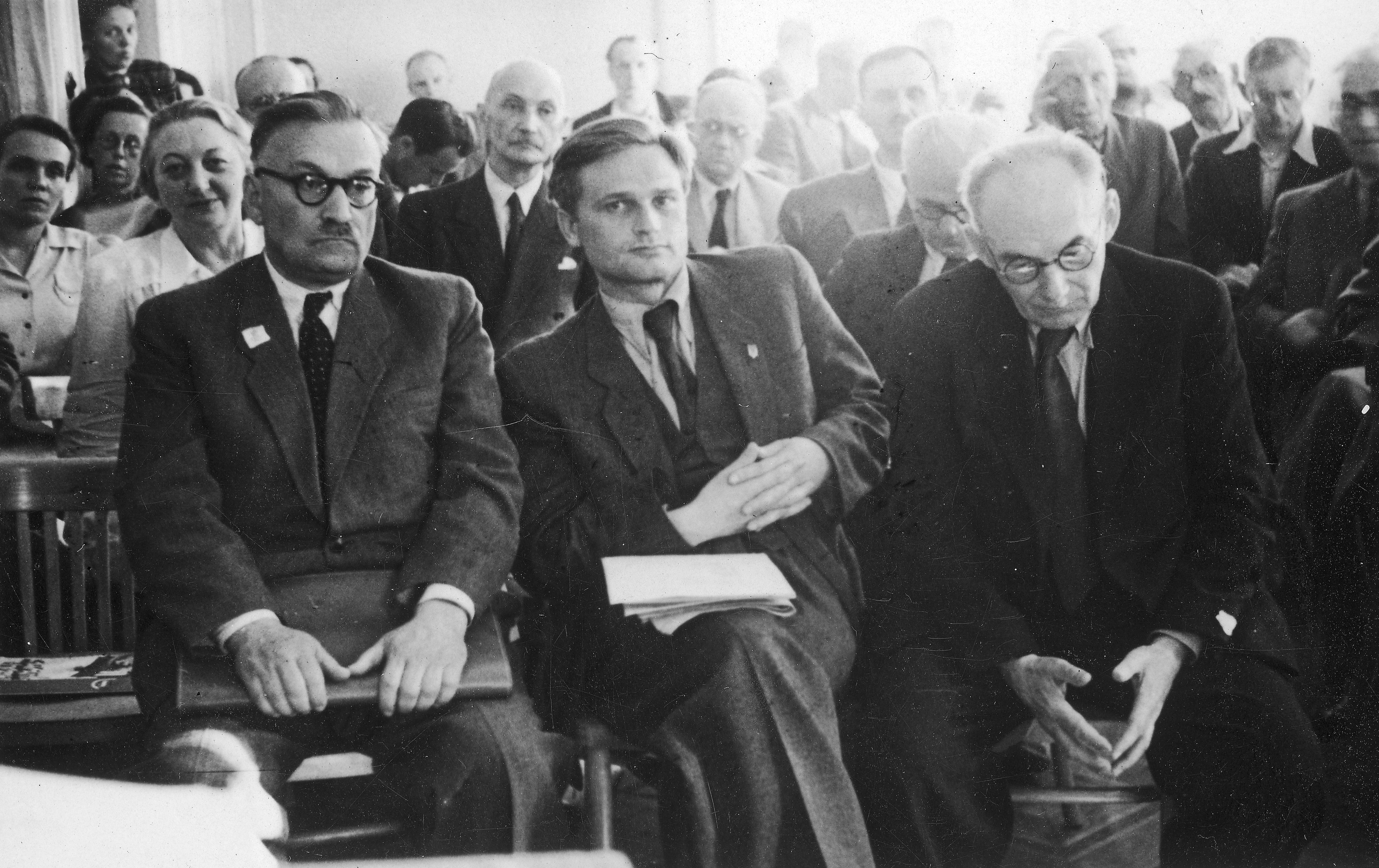
	First party	Second party	Third party
Leader	Bolesław Bierut	Józef Niećko	Wacław Barcikowski
Party	PZPR	ZSL	SD
Seats won	273	90	25
Premier before election
Józef Cyrankiewicz
PZPR
Elected Premier
Józef Cyrankiewicz
PZPR

Parliamentary elections were held in Poland on 26 October 1952. They were the first elections to the Sejm, the parliament of the Polish People's Republic. The official rules for the elections were outlined in the new Constitution of the Polish People's Republic and lesser acts.

No opposition parties were allowed to contest the elections. As a result, only one Front of National Unity candidate contested each seat in the Sejm, which had been reduced from 444 to 425. The Front, dominated by the Communist Polish United Workers' Party, received 99.8% of the vote and won every seat, setting the tone for all parliamentary elections until 1989. The communist regime claimed that around 15.5 million people voted, 95% of the electorate.

== Background ==
The communists had spent the five years since winning the rigged 1947 elections tightening their grip on the country. A little more than a year after the election, what remained of the Polish Socialist Party (PPS), nominally a partner in the communist-dominated "coalition," merged with the communist Polish Workers' Party (PPR) to form the Polish United Workers' Party (PZPR). However, the merger was concluded almost entirely on PPR terms and by this time the PPS was largely subservient to the PPR. Despite this, former socialist Józef Cyrankiewicz remained as prime minister. By 1949, the remains of the Polish People's Party (PSL), which had led the opposition in 1947, had been emasculated when it was forced to merge with the splinter pro-communist People's Party to form the United People's Party (ZSL).

PPR leader Władysław Gomułka, who had been largely responsible for the PPR's heavy-handed suppression of opposition, believed he was now free to pursue a more independent course. He wanted to adapt the Soviet blueprint to Polish circumstances and considered himself to be both a communist and a Polish patriot. He was also wary of the Cominform, and opposed forced collectivization of agriculture. However, he was pushed out as party leader in 1948, accused of "rightist-nationalist deviation." He was succeeded by President Bolesław Bierut, a hardline Stalinist.

== Conduct ==
The election set the tone for all subsequent elections held during the 42 years of Communist rule in Poland. As would be the case with all future elections, only PZPR-approved candidates participated, and the results were falsified as needed. Along with the 1947 election, the 1952 election is considered among the least free of elections held in communist Poland. This was typical of the era of Stalinization. The Bierut government, like its kindred regimes in the rest of the Soviet bloc, was determined to tighten its control over society as much as possible. All opposition parties had been either eliminated or driven underground by this time. The regime's opponents were persecuted. Voters were presented with a single list from the Front of National Unity (FJN), comprising the PZPR and its two satellite parties, the Alliance of Democrats (SD) and the ZSL. The number of candidates permitted to run in the elections was equal to the number of seats in parliament.

There were 425 seats. The number of seats would be increased in the subsequent elections. In return for accepting the "leading role" of the PZPR—a condition of their continued existence—the minor parties in the Front received a fixed number of seats in the Sejm.

== Results ==
The official results showed that 99.8% of the voters approved the FJN list. Candidates from the FJN parties took 91% of the Sejm seats, with 9% being taken by nominally independent candidates. Within the FJN, the PZPR held an absolute majority with 273 seats (64% of the total), its highest share to date. However, as the other parties and "independents" were subservient to the PZPR, communist control of the Sejm was complete. In later years, the communist-dominated lists would be credited with between 98 and 99% of the vote, a practice continued until 1989.

Party or alliance		Votes	%	Seats
Front of National Unity	Polish United Workers' Party	15,459,849	99.80	273
Front of National Unity	United People's Party	15,459,849	99.80	90
Front of National Unity	Democratic Party	15,459,849	99.80	25
Front of National Unity	Independents	15,459,849	99.80	37
Blank ballots		31,321	0.20	–
Total		15,491,170	100.00	425
Valid votes		15,491,170	99.97	
Invalid votes		4,645	0.03	
Total votes		15,495,815	100.00	
Registered voters/turnout		16,305,891	95.03	
Source: Nohlen & Stöver

== Aftermath ==
The term of the Sejm elected in 1951 was due to end in 1956, but due to political shifts in Poland, the next elections took place in early 1957 in a more liberal atmosphere, although still not free.
