= 1957 Polish parliamentary election =

- January 20, 1957

All 459 seats in the Sejm
- Turnout: 94.14%
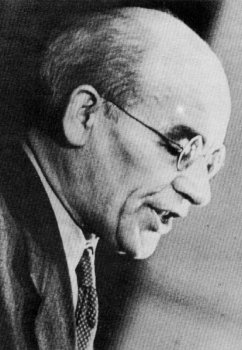
	First party
Leader	Władysław Gomułka
Party	PZPR
Alliance	FJN
Seats won	459
Seat change	▲34
Premier before election
Józef Cyrankiewicz
PZPR
Premier
Józef Cyrankiewicz
PZPR

Parliamentary elections were held in Poland on 20 January 1957. They were the second election to the Sejm – the unicameral parliament of the People's Republic of Poland, and the third ever in the history of Communist Poland. They took place during the liberalization period, following Władysław Gomułka's ascension to power. Although conducted in a more liberal atmosphere than previous elections, they were far from free. Voters had the option of voting against some official candidates; de facto having a small chance to express a vote of no confidence against the government and the ruling Communist Polish United Workers' Party. As in all Communist countries, there was no opportunity to elect any true opposition members to the Sejm, and the elections resulted in a predictable victory for the Front of National Unity, dominated by the PZPR.

While the elections were a clear victory for Gomułka, they did not guarantee lasting changes in Polish society. Gomułka's rule was somewhat more humane than that of his predecessor, hardline Stalinist Bolesław Bierut, and enjoyed moderate support during the first few years after the election in the "little stabilization" period of 1957–1963. By the mid-1960s it faced opposition from the competing factions in the PZPR itself. Coupled with growing popular opposition to Communist rule, Gomułka would be removed from power in the aftermath of the 1968 political crisis and the Polish 1970 protests.

== Background ==
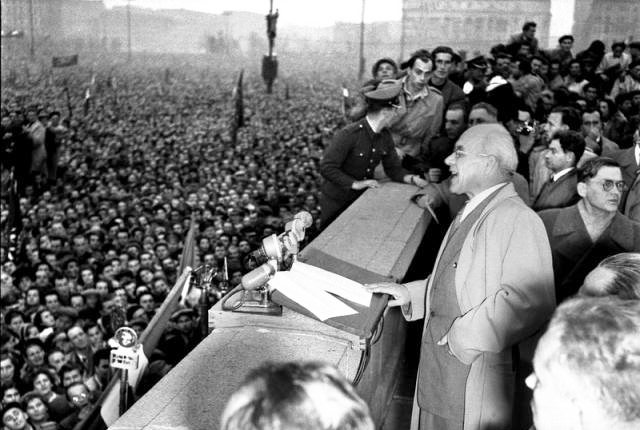
Władysław Gomułka, at the height of his popularity, addresses hundreds of thousand of people in Warsaw on 24 October 1956. He appealed for an end to demonstrations and return to work. "United with the working class and the nation", he concluded, "the Party will lead Poland along a new way of socialism." Gomułka's popularity at that time probably equalled that of Józef Piłsudski's in 1920 and Lech Wałęsa's in 1980; but disillusionment would soon follow.

The elections were originally planned for December 1956 but due to significant political changes in the government, resulting from Gomułka's ascension to power, they were delayed until early 1957. Among the various promises made by First Secretary Gomułka, during the Polish October peaceful revolution, to the restless Polish population was that of free elections. He knew that this was a promise that he could not keep without seeing his party defeated. In the January 1957 elections the new 'democratic' aspect was the reintroduction of the secret ballot, and more importantly, there were more candidates than available seats in the parliament; in the 1952 elections the number of candidates equaled the number of seats in the Sejm. Another liberalizing factor was that unlike in previous elections, intimidation by the secret police (Służba Bezpieczeństwa) and the government against the opposition was limited.

The candidates were divided into two groups - one officially supported by the party and the 'independents' (broadly following the communist party line but not declared members of the party). The latter would be only considered if over half of the registered voters in the district voted against the official candidates; otherwise all seats from the district (on average between 3 and 6) would be awarded to the official candidates.

Over 60,000 candidates were registered for the 459 seats in the Sejm. (Note: Staar (1958), Davies (2005) and majority of other sources report there were 459 seats. Diskin (2001:113) notes that in January 1957 there were 458 representatives. This illustrates the fact that one seat that did not get filled until the by-election held on 17 March 1957 at Nowy Sącz. A few sources incorrectly report that there were 458 seats available in the election.) The government was not prepared to release its hold on power, so the candidates were screened and only 720 or 723 out of 60,000 were finally allowed to participate and be published on the official list by the Front of National Unity (Polish: Front Jedności Narodu, FJN), the only organization allowed to put forth candidates in Polish elections. Factors such as the number of signatures in support of a candidate were deemed to be irrelevant.

According to an official government press agency dispatch, about half of the candidates (approx. 360) were PZPR members. A majority of the remainder belonged to PZPR allies (Democratic Party (SD), United People's Party (ZSL)). There was no opposition party in Poland since all political groupings had to support the program of the PZPR. As a result, no real opposition candidates were permitted to run in the elections, but in theory the Polish voters could have stripped the communists from their claimed legitimacy by abstaining from voting. Another means of preventing the PZPR from obtaining a political victory would have occurred if all of the PZPR candidates were struck out, leaving only 100 to be elected.

Despite the lack of genuine opposition, the liberalized election format allowed for various power struggles to be played out, primarily between the communist party candidates. A particularly notable case was the rivalry between certain candidates from the main communist party (PZPR) and one of the lesser communist parties (ZSL).

A day before the elections, Gomułka appealed to Polish citizens not to vote against the Party's candidates, asserting that 'crossing them out would equal crossing Poland off the map of Europe' and would bring upon Poland the fate of Hungary. The fear of a possible Soviet intervention, in case of Gomułka's loss, was also repeated by Radio Free Europe, which noted that Gomułka's argument while "cruel", is likely "entirely correct." Gomułka also persuaded the Catholic Church to urge voters to go to the polls and declare a vote of confidence in the government. Supporting him, Cardinal Stefan Wyszyński officially declared his support for the 'no crossing' policy.

== Results ==
Party or alliance		Votes	%	Seats	+/–
Front of National Unity	Polish United Workers' Party	16,563,314	98.40	239	–34
Front of National Unity	United People's Party	16,563,314	98.40	118	+28
Front of National Unity	Democratic Party	16,563,314	98.40	39	+14
Front of National Unity	Independents	16,563,314	98.40	63	+26
Blank ballots		270,002	1.60	–	–
Total		16,833,316	100.00	459	+34
Valid votes		16,833,316	99.65		
Invalid votes		58,897	0.35		
Total votes		16,892,213	100.00		
Registered voters/turnout		17,944,081	94.14		
Source: Nohlen & Stöver

The Polish United Workers' Party (PZPR) won 237 (239 after by-elections) (Note: Staar (1958) reports results as cited by the Trybuna Ludu newspaper on 27 January 1957, and cites results of the February and March by-elections that year, as reported by Radio Warsaw in March and May that year. As his article was published in May 1958, his results cannot include the results of by-elections from October 1958. Michalski, Bardach and Ajnenkiel (1989) mention that two more by-elections occurred at that time, and Davies (2005) gives the results presumably corrected for by-elections results, indicating that two seats from ZSL went to PZPR.) seats out of 459^{[a]} while the remainder went its satellite parties (Democratic Party and United People's Party) and a few independents. PZPR 237 seats gave it 51.7% of total, ZSL with 120 (118 after by-elections)^{[b]} had 26.1%, the independents with 63 had 14% (non-party faction, 51, and Catholics from the Znak association, 12) and SD with 39 had 8.5%. The FJN alliance was victorious, with 80.8% of the seats.

Overall, the FJN alliance gained 8 seats compared to its 1952 results, but the independents nearly doubled their presence, from 37 to 63 (this is explained as the Sejm of 1957 had 459 seats, an increase of 34 from the 1952, which had only 425 seats). PZPR was the biggest loser, with 34 seats less than in 1952, ZSL gained 28, and SD, 14. However, as the other parties and "independents" were in fact subordinate to PZPR, its control of the Sejm was, in fact, total. The representational pattern in the Sejm would be nearly stable for the next 30 years, following a slight swing from the independents to PZPR in 1961.

According to official data, turnout was 94.14%, which are considered to be somewhat suspect considering heavy snowfalls and unfavorable weather conditions prevailing in Poland at the time, and 98.4% of votes were cast for official candidates. Approximately 10.6% of the voters disobeyed the calls for "no crossing", but in the end only one seat (in Nowy Sącz) remained unfilled due to no candidate achieving absolute majority.

The new Sejm had its first session on 20 February. Its senior marshal (speaker) was Bolesław Drobner; its Sejm marshal was Czesław Wycech. Only 12% of the new deputies were members of the previous, 1952, Sejm.

Two by-elections were held after the main election. The first took place on 17 March 1957 at Nowy Sącz. The second took place at Wieluń on 5 May 1957 to replace the incumbent who died on February 5. Those by-elections were won by the PZPR and the ZSL respectively. Two more by-elections took place on October 19, 1958, in Myślenice and Oleśnica. In those by-elections, ZSL lost the seats to PZPR.^{[b]}

== Aftermath ==
Despite Gomułka's hopes, the elections, while victorious for him, did not mean the end of opposition to the communist rule. For a while, support for the Gomułka-led communist party ran high. Reflecting this, the period 1957-1963 is known as "little stabilization". While his regime was much more liberal than the one he succeeded, this gave rise to an opposition within the PZPR party, as some communist politicians, like General Mieczysław Moczar, saw Gomułka as "too soft." Meanwhile, dissension with the communist rule would grow, and the Polish 1970 protests, soon after the 1968 Polish political crisis, would eventually cause him to lose support with the PZPR party; suffering from nervous exhaustion, Gomułka would be forced to resign and replaced by Edward Gierek.
