= 1976 Polish parliamentary election =

- 21 March 1976

All 460 seats in the Sejm
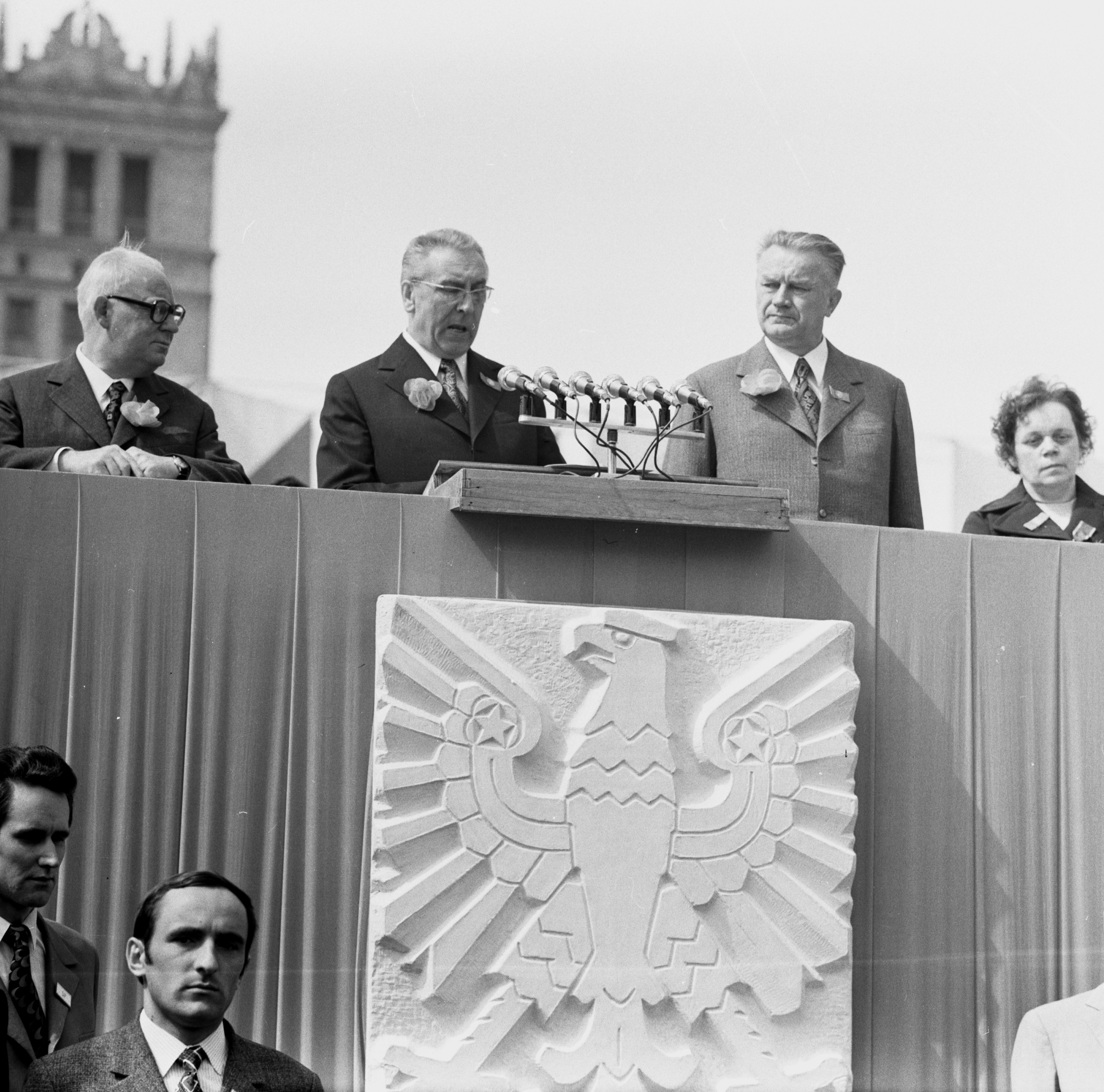

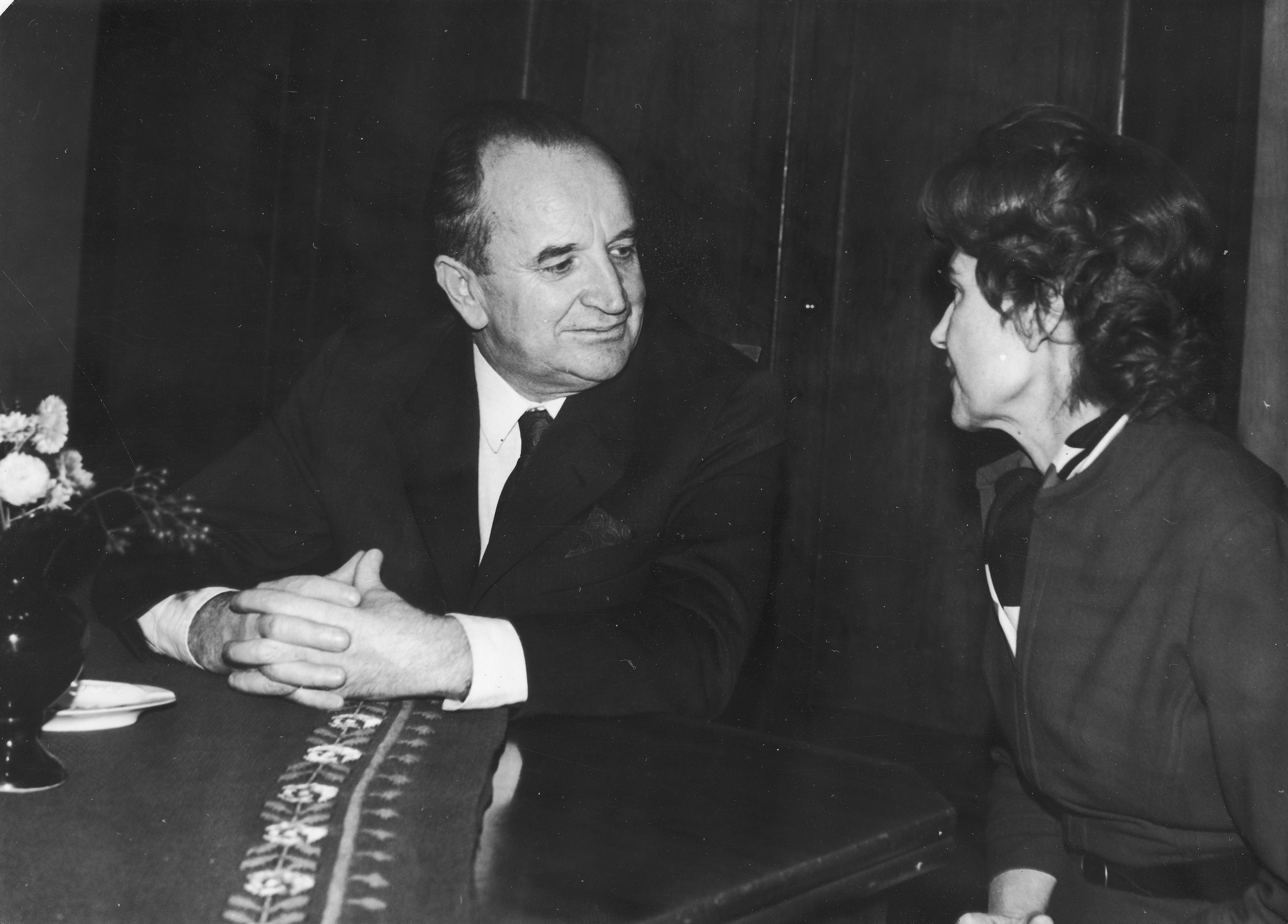

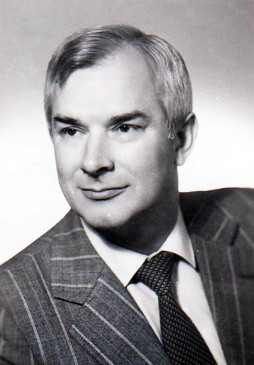
	Majority party	Minority party	Third party
Leader	Edward Gierek	Stanisław Gucwa	Tadeusz Witold Młyńczak
Party	PZPR	ZSL	SD
Last election	255 seats	117 seats	39 seats
Seats won	261	113	37
Seat change	▲6	▼4	▼2

Parliamentary elections were held in Poland on 21 March 1976.

== Results ==
Party or alliance		Votes	%	Seats	+/–
Front of National Unity	Polish United Workers' Party	23,502,983	99.43	261	+6
Front of National Unity	United People's Party	23,502,983	99.43	113	–4
Front of National Unity	Democratic Party	23,502,983	99.43	37	–2
Front of National Unity	Independents	23,502,983	99.43	49	0
Blank ballots		134,350	0.57	–	–
Total		23,637,333	100.00	460	0
Valid votes		23,637,333	99.94		
Invalid votes		14,923	0.06		
Total votes		23,652,256	100.00		
Registered voters/turnout		24,069,579	98.27		
Source: Nohlen & Stöver

As the other parties and "independents" were subordinate to PZPR, its control of the Sejm was total.
