= State Tribunal (Poland) =

Judicial body ruling on constitutional liability in Poland

- Polish: Trybunał Stanu

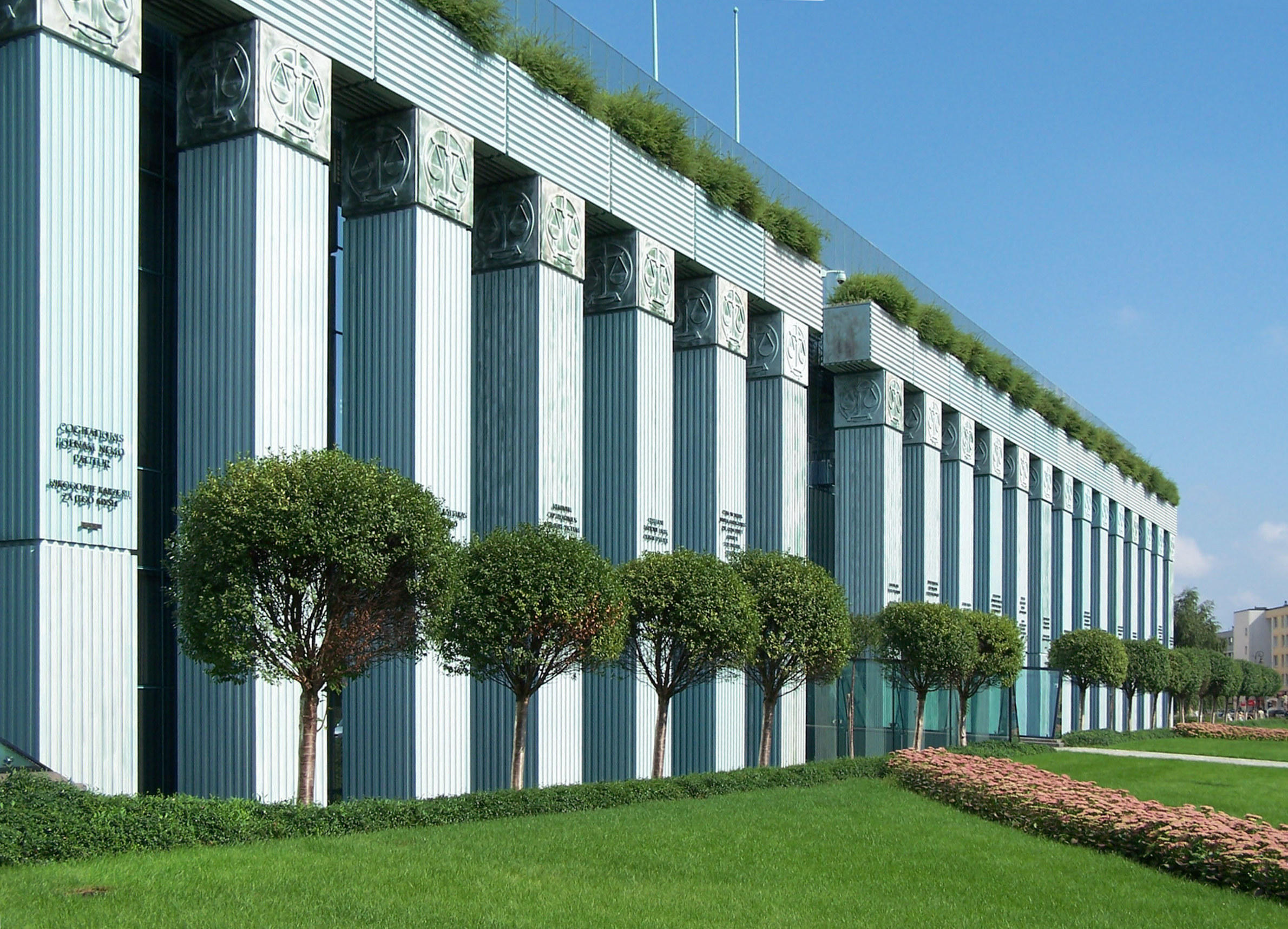
- Location of the Tribunal, Supreme Court building in Warsaw
- Interactive map of State Tribunal
- 52.2498735°N 21.005392°E
- Established: 1921; 105 years ago
- Jurisdiction: Poland
- Location: Warsaw
- Coordinates: 52.2498735°N 21.005392°E
- Authorised by: Constitution of Poland
- Judge term length: 4 years
- Number of positions: 19
- Website: trybunalstanu.pl

First President of the Supreme Court
- Currently: Małgorzata Manowska
- Since: May 26, 2020; 6 years ago

The State Tribunal (Polish: Trybunał Stanu [trɘˈbu.naw ˈsta.nu]) of the Republic of Poland is a judicial body that rules on the constitutional liability of people holding the highest offices of state. It examines cases concerning the infringement of the Constitution and laws or crimes committed by the President, members of the government, the President of the Supreme Chamber of Control, the President of the National Bank of Poland, heads of central administrative offices and other senior state officials.

In Poland, referral to the State Tribunal is used instead of the process of impeachment, which is traditionally used in some other nations as a way of addressing similar allegations against persons holding analogous offices.

The State Tribunal is empowered to rule for the removal of individuals from public office, to impose injunctions on individuals against their appointment to senior offices, to revoke an individual's right to vote and to stand for election, to withdraw previously awarded medals, distinctions and titles of honour, and in criminal cases to impose penalties stipulated in the criminal code.

The composition of the State Tribunal is established at the first sitting of each new Sejm and is binding for its term (with the exception that the head of the office is Chief Justice, appointed by President for a six-year term). His two deputies and 16 members of the State Tribunal are chosen from outside the Sejm. Members of the State Tribunal must hold Polish citizenship, may not have a criminal record or have had their civic rights revoked, nor may they be employed in the state administration.

== Members ==
Term	Chief Justice	Vice Chief Justice	Members
I (1982–1985)	Włodzimierz Berutowicz	Witold Lassota	Stanisław Antoszewski, Jerzy Bratoszewski, Andrzej Burda, Henryk Cieśluk, Andrzej Elbanowski, Henryk Groszyk, Henryk Kempisty, Stanisław Kotowski, Henryk Korotyński, Jan Kwakszyc, Kazimierz Lipiński, Jan Meysztowicz, Franciszek Mleczko, Kazimierz Modzelewski, Jan Pawlak, Wojciech Romanowski, Zbigniew Salwa, Stanisława Świderska, Bolesław Szlązak, Jerzy Topolski, Alfred Wawrzyniak, Jerzy Wróblewski Alternate members: Stanisław Pawela, Stefan Rutkowski, Adolf Sobieraj, Stanisław Stolz, Bolesław Wójtowicz
II (1985–1989)	Włodzimierz Berutowicz (1985–1987); Adam Łopatka (1987–1989)	Witold Lassota	Jerzy Bratoszewski, Henryk Cieśluk, Zbigniew Czajkowski, Andrzej Elbanowski, Tadeusz Kałasa, Stanisław Kotowski, Jan Kwakszyc, Janina Łęgowska, Jan Meysztowicz, Józef Mikos, Franciszek Mleczko, Jan Pawlak, Stanisław Pniewski, Maciej Poros, Wojciech Romanowski, Zbigniew Salwa, Jan Socha, Stanisława Świderska, Jerzy Topolski, Czesław Ura, Jerzy Wróblewski, Jan Zając Alternate members: Henryk Kostrzewa, Adolf Sobieraj, Stanisław Stolz, Tadeusz Woźniczka, Maria Zakrzewska
III (1989–1991)	Adam Łopatka (1989–1990); Adam Strzembosz (1990–1991)	Jan Olszewski	Józef Mikos, Stanisław Afenda, Karol Cebula, Zbigniew Czajkowski, Piotr Chojnacki, Maciej Dubois, Stanisław Estreich, Stanisław Fornalik, Elżbieta Gacek, Roman Jagieliński, Jerzy Jasiński, Andrzej Kalwas, Jerzy Kłoczowski, Leszek Kubicki, Jacek Kurczewski, Marek Kuryłowicz, Andrzej Płaza, Grzegorz Leopold Seidler, Janusz Sokołowski, Leon Taylor, Tadeusz de Virion, Stanisław Żelichowski Alternate members: Kazimierz Barczyk, Janina Łęgowska, Piotr Winczorek, Wiesław Zabłocki, Jerzy Zaniemojski
IV (1991–1993)	Adam Strzembosz	Olgierd Baehr; Jerzy Jasiński	Andrzej Bąkowski, Maciej Bednarkiewicz, Janusz Chmiel, Teresa Dębowska-Romanowska, Janusz Dobrosz, Grzegorz Karziewicz, Mieczysław Korczak, Piotr Kryczka, Franciszek Marek, Stanisław Maurer, Tadeusz Mołdawa, Barbara Niemiec, Zbigniew Rokicki, Irena Zofia Romaszewska, Franciszek Ryszka, Władysław Siła-Nowicki, Tadeusz Szymczak, Hanna Świda-Ziemba, Piotr Winczorek, Wiesław Woda, Janusz Wojciechowski Alternate members: Krzysztof Góźdź-Roszkowski, Edward Loryś, Stanisław Michalkiewicz, Emilia Pogonowska-Jucha, Wiesław Zabłocki
V (1993–1997)	Adam Strzembosz	Ryszard Kalisz; Lech Krzysztof Paprzycki	Anna Bogucka-Skowrońska, Grzegorz Gapiński, Stanisław Gebethner, Wojciech Gryczewski, Wiesław Kamiński, Grzegorz Karziewicz, Ryszard Kochaniak, Jerzy Królak, Edward Loryś, Tadeusz Mołdawa, Emilia Pogonowska-Jucha, Franciszek Ryszka, Edward Rzepka, Feliks Siemieński, Eugeniusz Smoktunowicz, Wojciech Solarewicz, Marek Staszak, Maria Szyszkowska, Roman Tokarczyk, Tadeusz de Virion, Edward Wende Alternate members: Halina Bortnowska, Krzysztof Czeszejko-Sochacki, Wojciech Geyer, Jan Kaczmarek, Edmund Kozłowski
VI (1997–2001)	Adam Strzembosz (1997–1998); Lech Gardocki (1998–2001)	Marian Filar; Edward Rzepka	Andrzej Bąkowski, Maciej Bednarkiewicz, Tadeusz Bielecki, Jerzy Chmura, Zbigniew Cichoń, Krystyna Gaczek, Wiesław Kamiński, Elżbieta Markowicz, Stanisław Mikke, Włodzimierz Nykiel, Walerian Piotrowski, Jerzy Pomin, Andrzej Sandomierski, Ludwik Turko, Tadeusz de Virion, Jerzy Weinberger
VII (2001–2005)	Lech Gardocki	Jacek Majchrowski; Ryszard Skubisz	Ryszard Bender, Stanisław Estreich, Wojciech Geyer, Andrzej Kalwas (2001–2004), Tadeusz Kilian, Artur Korobowicz, Janusz Niedziela (2002–2005), Andrzej Sandomierski, Andrzej Sokala (2003–2005), Jan Szyszko, Krzysztof Śmieja (2003–2005), Krzysztof Śniegocki, Wojciech Tomczyk, Tadeusz de Virion, Edward Wende (2001–2002), Mariusz Zakręt, Eleonora Zielińska (2004–2005), Róża Żarska
VIII (2005–2007)	Lech Gardocki	Kazimierz Barczyk (2006–2007); Jan Olszewski (2005–2006); Stanisław Owczarek (2005–2006); Jarema Trzebiński (2006–2007)	Lech Adamczyk, Andrzej Buczkowski, Zbigniew Cichoń, Henryk Dzido, Andrzej Grabiński, Ewa Gruza, Jan Maria Jackowski, Dariusz Kijowski, Sylweriusz Królak, Michał Lizak, Jacek Majchrowski, Janusz Margasiński, Roman Nowosielski, Andrzej Jan Szwarc (w 2007), Krzysztof Śniegocki (2005–2006)
IX (2007–2011)	Lech Gardocki (2007–2010); Stanisław Dąbrowski (2010–2011)	Andrzej Grabiński; Stanisław Rymar (2007–2010); Jolanta Zajdel-Sarnowicz (w 2011)	Lech Adamczyk, Kazimierz Barczyk, Anna Bogucka-Skowrońska, Andrzej Duda, Ewa Gruza, Dariusz Kijowski, Sylweriusz Królak, Jacek Majchrowski, Janusz Margasiński, Józef Medyk, Roman Nowosielski, Krystyna Pawłowicz, Andrzej Jan Szwarc, Krzysztof Śmieja, Jarema Trzebiński, Andrzej Wosiński
X (2011–2015)	Stanisław Dąbrowski (2011–2014); Małgorzata Gersdorf (from 2014)	Jacek Dubois (2012–2015); Andrzej Grabiński; Józef Medyk (2011–2012)	Lech Adamczyk, Piotr Andrzejewski, Kazimierz Barczyk, Anna Bogucka-Skowrońska, Grzegorz Górski (2011–2014), Paweł Janda, Dariusz Kijowski, Sylweriusz Królak, Janusz Łomża, Lech Morawski (2014–2015), Mariusz Muszyński, Romana Orlikowska-Wrońska, Zbigniew Romaszewski (2011–2014), Paweł Śliwa, Andrzej Wosiński, Jolanta Zajdel-Sarnowicz, Eleonora Zielińska
XI (2015–2019)	Małgorzata Gersdorf	Jerzy Kozdroń; Mariusz Muszyński (2015–2017); Andrzej Rogoyski (from 2017)	Piotr Andrzejewski, Bogusław Banaszak (2017–2018) Kazimierz Barczyk, Marek Czeszkiewicz, Jacek Dubois, Czesław Kłak (from 2018), Andrzej Kojro, Robert Majka (2015–2018), Maciej Miłosz, Witold Pahl, Maciej Prostko (from 2019), Andrzej Rościszewski (2015–2019), Zbigniew Sieczkoś, Rafał Sura (2015–2016), Bogdan Szlachta, Paweł Śliwa, Jerzy Wierchowicz, Jarosław Wyrembak (2015–2018), Maciej Zaborowski (from 2018), Józef Zych
XII (from 2019)	Małgorzata Gersdorf (2019–2020); Małgorzata Manowska (from 2020)	Piotr Andrzejewski; Marek Chmaj	Roman Budzinowski, Marek Czeszkiewicz, Jacek Dubois, Sebastian Gajewski, Zdzisław Gawlik, Jan Jobs, Piotr Jóźwiak, Czesław Kłak, Andrzej Kojro, Iwona Olejnik, Witold Pahl, Bogdan Szlachta, Paweł Śliwa, Jerzy Wierchowicz, Maciej Zaborowski, Tomasz Zalasiński
XIII (from 2023)	Małgorzata Manowska (2023–2026) Zbigniew Kapiński (from 2026)	Piotr Andrzejewski; Jacek Dubois	Marek Czeszkiewicz, Kamila Ferenc, Sabina Grabowska, Adam Koczyk, Jan Majchrowski, Marek Małecki, Marek Mikołajczyk, Maciej Miłosz, Marcin Radwan-Röhrenschef, Przemysław Rosati, Piotr Sak, Adrian Salus, Marcin Wawrzyniak, Maciej Zaborowski, Piotr Zientarski, Józef Zych
