= Zbigniew Kapiński =

Polish lawyer and judge

16th First President of the Supreme Court
- Incumbent
- Assumed office 27 May 2026
- Nominated by: Karol Nawrocki
- Preceded by: Małgorzata Manowska

Personal details
- Born: Zbigniew Józef Kapiński; February 16, 1963 (age 63) Mokobody, Poland
- Education: Maria Curie-Skłodowska University

Zbigniew Józef Kapiński (born 16 February 1963 in Mokobody) is a Polish jurist and judge serving as the First President of the Supreme Court of the Republic of Poland and the Chairman of the Tribunal of State. He was appointed to the position by the President of the Republic of Poland Karol Nawrocki for a six-year term, which began on 27 May 2026.

== Career ==
Kapiński received his master's degree in law from the Faculty of Law and Administration at Maria Curie-Skłodowska University in Lublin in 1988. After completing his judicial training in Warsaw, he passed his professional examination in 1990. From 1990 to 1992, he worked as a junior judge (assessor) at the District Court in Siedlce, and in 1992 became a regular judge of that court. In 1996, he was appointed a judge of the Voivodeship Court in Siedlce, and in 2001, a judge of the Court of Appeal in Warsaw. He initially served in both the 5th Lustration Division and the 2nd Criminal Division. From 2007 to 2015, he served exclusively in the 2nd Criminal Division of the Court of Appeal in Warsaw. From 2015 to 2022, while continuing to adjudicate in the Criminal Division, he was a visiting judge in criminal cases.

On 23 June 2022, he was appointed a judge of the Supreme Court by the President of the Republic of Poland Andrzej Duda. From 2023 to 2026, he served as the President of the Supreme Court heading the Criminal Chamber. Since 27 May 2026, Kapiński has served as the First President of the Supreme Court, appointed to the position for a six-year term by the President of the Republic of Poland on 25 May 2026.

Apart from his judicial roles, Kapiński is a recognized specialist in criminal law, especially criminal procedure. He is actively engaged in the training of judges, prosecutors, advocates, attorneys-at-law, and notaries. He was involved in the training of judges at conferences held within the jurisdiction of various Courts of Appeal, including Warsaw, Łódź, Wrocław, and Białystok. Kapiński was also a member of examination boards for admission to the bar. Moreover, he was involved in the training of judges as a lecturer at the National School of Judiciary and Public Prosecution in Kraków. From 2004 to 2015, Kapiński also lectured at the University of Natural Sciences and Humanities in Siedlce.

Kapiński has authored several academic publications, including the study Criminal Appeals: Practical Issues, Files, and Case Studies (pl. Apelacje karne. Zagadnienia praktyczne, akta i kazusy).

== Controversy ==
Kapiński's appointment drew criticism from both Poland's governing coalition and the opposition. Jarosław Kaczyński, chairman of the Polish Law and Justice party, and former head of the National Security Bureau Sławomir Cenckiewicz objected to Kapiński's role on the Warsaw Court of Appeal panel that in 2000 upheld the truthfulness of former President Lech Wałęsa's lustration declaration, in which he denied having been a communist-era security agent.

Separately, Kapiński is among the judges appointed to the Supreme Court after the 2017–2018 legal changes to the National Council of the Judiciary, whose status has been contested by the European Court of Human Rights and the Court of Justice of the European Union. Deputy Minister of Justice Dariusz Mazur described Kapiński as a "neo-judge", a pejorative term used to describe judges appointed by the council after the 2017–2018 changes. Kapiński rejected the criticism, noting that the same procedure had recently been used to select new members of the council.

== Personal life ==
He is married, with four children.
