= Jan Długosz =

Polish priest and historian (1415–1480)

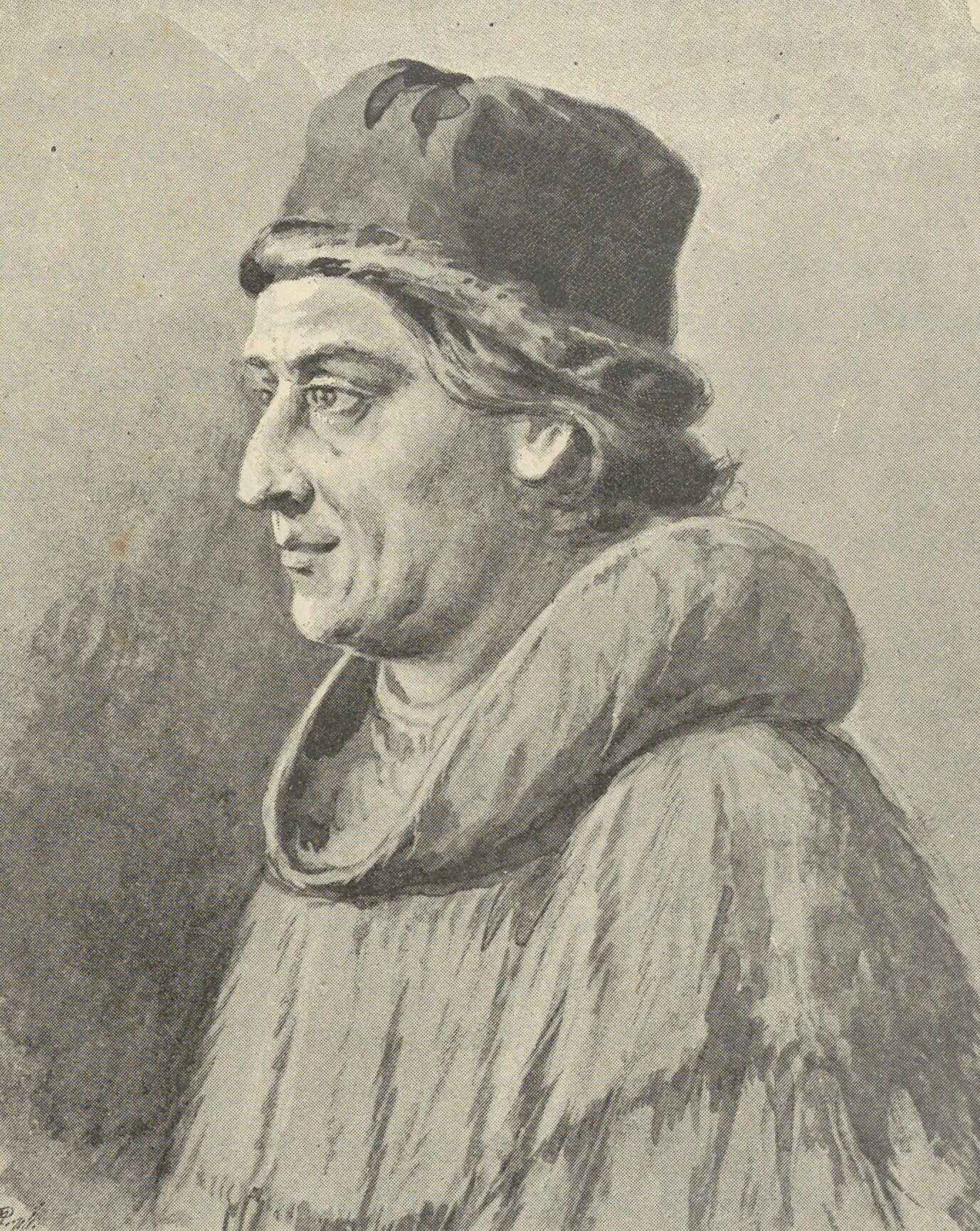
- Portrait by Walery Eljasz, 1889
- Born: 1 December 1415; Stara Brzeźnica, Sieradz Voivodeship, Kingdom of Poland
- Died: 19 May 1480 (aged 64); Kraków, Kraków Voivodeship, Kingdom of Poland
- Other names: Joannes; Ioannes; Johannes Longinus; Dlugossius
- Occupations: priest; diplomat; soldier; historian
- Notable work: Latin: Annales seu cronici incliti regni Poloniae
Jan Długosz
- Archbishop-Elect of Lviv
- Church: Catholic Church
- Archdiocese: Archdiocese of Lviv
- In office: 2 June 1480 - c. 1481
- Predecessor: Gregory of Sanok
- Successor: Jan Strzelecki

Jan Długosz (Polish pronunciation: [ˈjan ˈdwuɡɔʂ]; 1 December 1415 – 19 May 1480), also known in Latin as Johannes Longinus, was a Polish priest, chronicler, diplomat, soldier, and secretary to Bishop Zbigniew Oleśnicki of Kraków. He is considered Poland's first historian.

== Life ==
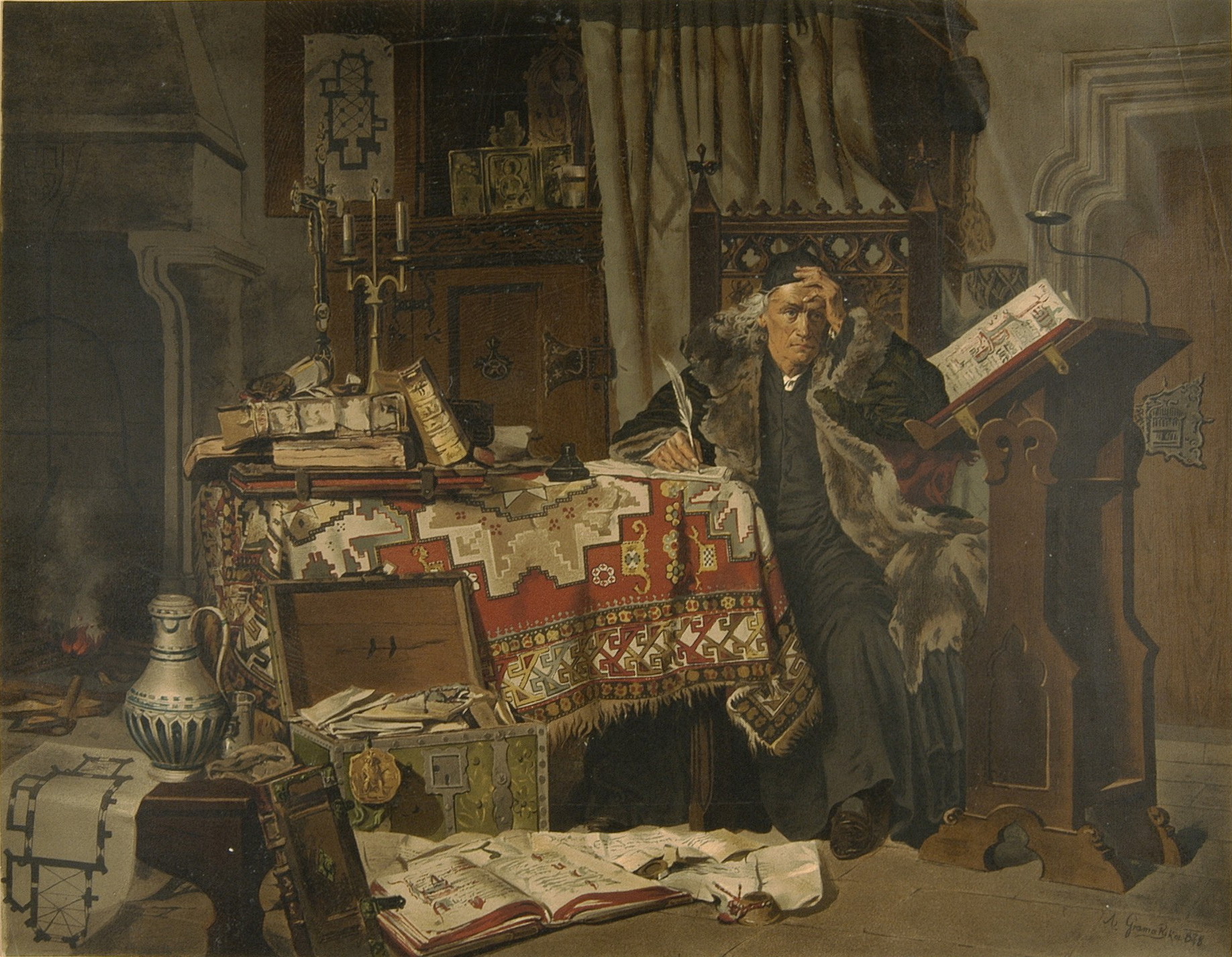
Jan Długosz by Antoni Gramatyka

Długosz was born in 1415 in Brzeźnica in the Sieradz Land, into a family of noble origin. His father was Jan of Niedzielsko of the Wieniawa coat of arms, and his mother was Beta, the daughter of Marcin of Borowno. Długosz grew up in the legend of the Battle of Grunwald, in which his father had fought and for which he received the starostwo of Brzeźnica, and later also an office in Nowe Miasto Korczyn. It was there that Długosz attended the parish school.

In 1428–1431 he studied at the Kraków Academy, though he did not obtain any degree. After completing his studies, at the age of sixteen he became a notary in the chancellery of the Bishop of Kraków, Zbigniew Oleśnicki. In 1436 he received priestly ordination and became a canon of Kraków. He quickly became a close collaborator of the bishop, advancing in rank and eventually becoming his chancellor. He was also among those who shielded the bishop with their own bodies when, while returning from the Hungarian coronation of Władysław III, they were attacked by Hungarians near Köves on 31 July 1440.

He acted diplomatically on behalf of the bishop, with full conviction building and defending his position. Zbigniew Oleśnicki rose to become one of the most important figures in the state, entering into conflict with King Casimir IV Jagiellon. In 1444 he obtained the Duchy of Siewierz together with the princely title, and in 1449, among other things thanks to Długosz, he received the rank of cardinal. For this reason Oleśnicki demanded precedence for himself in the royal council before the primate, the Archbishop of Gniezno.

Oleśnicki, and with him Długosz, supported the subordination of Lithuania to Poland. On this matter, in 1451 at Sambir, Długosz argued sharply, against the king, in favor of incorporating Volhynia into the Kingdom of Poland. At that time Długosz also undertook a formative pilgrimage to the Holy Land with his friend Jan Elgot.

He was sent by King Casimir IV Jagiellon of Poland on diplomatic missions to the Papal and Imperial courts, and was involved in the King's negotiations with the Teutonic Knights during the Thirteen Years' War (1454–66) and at the peace negotiations.

When scholar Sandivogius of Czechel left Krakow, Długosz as his friend kept him in touch with the university.

In 1434, Długosz's uncle, the first pastor at Kłobuck, appointed him to take over his position as canon of St. Martin church there. The town was in the Opole territory of Silesia, but had recently been conquered by Władysław II Jagiełło. Długosz stayed until 1452 and while there, founded the canonical monastery.

In 1450, Długosz was sent by Queen Sophia of Halshany and King Casimir to conduct peace negotiations between John Hunyadi and the Bohemian noble Jan Jiskra of Brandýs, and after six days' of talks convinced them to sign a truce.

In 1455 in Kraków, a fire spread which destroyed much of the city and the castle, but which spared Długosz's House.

In 1461 a Polish delegation which included Długosz met with emissaries of George of Podebrady in Bytom, Silesia. After six days of talks, they concluded an alliance between the two factions. In 1466 Długosz was sent to the legate of Wrocław, in order to attempt to obtain assurance that the legate was not biased in favor of the Teutonic Knights. He was successful, and was in 1467 entrusted with tutoring the king's son.

Długosz declined the offer of the Archbishopric of Prague, but shortly before his death was nominated Archbishop of Lwów. This nomination was only confirmed by Pope Sixtus IV on 2 June 1480, two weeks after his death.

His work Banderia Prutenorum of 1448 is his description of the 1410 Battle of Grunwald, which took place between villages of Grunwald and Stębark.

At some point in his life Długosz loosely translated Wigand of Marburg's Chronica nova Prutenica from Middle High German into Latin, however with many mistakes and mixup of names and places.

== Works ==
Jan Długosz is best known for his Annals or Chronicles of the Famous Kingdom of Poland (Annales seu cronici incliti regni Poloniae) in 12 volumes and originally written in Latin, covering events throughout southeastern and western Europe, from 965 to 1480, the year he died. Długosz combined features of Medieval chronicles with elements of humanistic historiography. For writing the history of the Kingdom of Poland, Długosz also used Ruthenian chronicles including those that did not survive to our times (among which there could have been used the Kyiv collection of chronicles of the 11th century in the Przemysl's edition around 1100 and the Przemysl episcopal collections of 1225–40).

His work was first printed in 1701–1703. It was originally printed at the Jan Szeliga printing house in Dobromyl financed by Jan Szczęsny Herburt.

- Liber beneficiorum dioecesis Cracoviensis
- Annales seu cronicae incliti Regni Poloniae (Annals or Chronicles of the Famous Kingdom of Poland)

Roczniki, czyli kroniki sławnego Królestwa Polskiego (new Polish translation of the Annals, 1961–2006)
The Annals of Jan Dlugosz (English translation of key sections of the work, ISBN 1-901019-00-4)

- Historiae Polonicae libri xii (Polish Histories, in Twelve Books; written 1455–80; first published 1711–12, in 2 volumes)
- Banderia Prutenorum, flag book, completed in or shortly after 1448, when Stanisław Durink painted the illuminations.

== See also ==
- Jan Długosz Award
- History of Poland
- Długosz House in Sandomierz

Religious titles
Preceded by Grzegorz z Sanoka	Archbishop of Lwów; 1480	Succeeded by Jan Strzelecki
