= Witold Lassota =

Polish journalist, political activist, member of the Polish People's Republic Sejm

- Born: 16 August 1916; Cherkasy Russian Empire
- Died: 6 January 2004 (aged 87); Ciechocinek, Poland
- Resting place: Ciechocinek
- Occupations: Journalist, political activist
- Children: Wanda Wermińska
- Awards

Witold Lassota (1916-2004), alias Wiesław or Skoczek, was a Polish journalist, political activist, editor-in-chief of the daily Ilustrowany Kurier Polski (1953–1986), member of the Polish parliament (1961-1980) and vice-chairman of the State Tribunal (1982–1989). He was one of the longest-serving editors-in-chief of newspapers in Poland.

== Biography ==
=== Youth ===
Witold Lassota was born on 16 August 1916, in Cherkassy, Kiev Governorate, then in Russian Empire. His father was Leon Lassota (1890-1976) and his mother Jadwiga née Tarnowska. The Lassotas are related to the Rawicz-Lassota noble family, dating back to the 16th century: one of their ancestor was Erich Lassota von Steblau. Witold's grandfather fought during the January Uprising (1863-1864). Thanks to this history, the Lassota family kept regular contacts with authors such as Gabriela Zapolskaor Jarosław Iwaszkiewicz.

With the signature of the Treaty of Riga and the shifting of the Polish-Soviet border, the family had to transfer to Kovel (in today's Ukraine), in order to stay on Polish territory. Young Witold attended primary school and passed his Matura exam there. He then graduated from the State Technical School in Lviv (then Lwów). In the city, Lassota made his first contact with journalism when he sent a reportage photography to the Polish daily Wiek Nowy (New Century) which was later published.

After graduating in 1939, he took a job as a road and bridge construction engineer in Zhabinka (then Żabinka) in present day Belarus. With his experience, Witold was accepted to the third year of studies at the Lviv Polytechnic.

=== Second World War ===
After the Soviet occupation, he stayed in a town near the city of Brest. After the occupation of Polesie by German troops in 1941, Witold fought in the partisan unit of Józef Sobiesiak, aka Maks.

In 1942, Maks troops joined the ranks of the Home Army; Lassota took the pseudonyms Skoczek and Wiesław as nom de guerre. Later, he used as well the fictitious name Marynowski.

Witold was not only the adjutant of the commandant of the 30th Home Army Infantry Division, but also the head of sabotage: he organized the wrecking of the Brest - Kovel - Sarny railway line. Furthermore, he protected civilians of Volhynia against the attacks of the Ukrainian Insurgent Army. In 1944, he joined the Soviet partisans of the Lublin Region. That same year, Lassota was arrested in Siedlce and sent to a Soviet Labor camp near Perm.

Liberated in 1946, he moved back to Poland.

=== Polish People's Republic (1974-1989) ===
Witold Lassota settled in Toruń, near Pędzewo, where his family had previously lived. There, from 1946 to 1952, he headed the Urząd Kontroli Prasy, Publikacji i Widowisk (Office for the Control of the Press, Publications and Performances), dealing with the control and verification of press, radio and television publications, book publications, films, theater performances, shows and exhibitions. In addition, he cooperated with the daily newspaper Głos Pomorza and the weekly newspaper Głos Demokratyczny.

=== Political life ===
In 1946, he joined the party Stronnictwo Demokratyczne (SD). In 1952, Lassota graduated from the Faculty of Law of the Nicolaus Copernicus University in Toruń. In January the following year, he took over the position of editor-in-chief at the Illustrated Polish Courier, a daily newspaper based in Bydgoszcz.

In 1961, he entered the Sejm, elected in the Bydgoszcz district after the Polish parliamentary election. He was re-elected in the same district during the following ballots in 1965, 1969, 1972 and 1976. In the PRL Sejm, Witold sat on the Justice Committee and chaired the Culture and Art Committee: as such, he championed the support for the project of the Opera Nova in Bydgoszcz.

Between 1954 and 1981, he was a member of the SD Central Committee: he even presided it in 1980-1981. Likewise, he was the deputy chairman of the Provincial SD Committee in Bydgoszcz from 1961 to 1981. Lastly, he held the position of vice-chairman of the Provincial Committee of the Front of National Unity. At regional level, Witold headed in 1984 the Social Council for the Establishment of the Medical Academy in Bydgoszcz.

=== State councillor ===
After leaving the Sejm, Lassota served as:

- a deputy chairman at the Tribunal of State for two terms (1982–1989);
- a deputy chairman at the National Council;
- a member of the Consultative Council at the Chairman of the State Council (Rada Konsultacyjna przy Przewodniczącym Rady Państwa) (1986–1989).

Witold Lassota left the position of editor-in-chief of the Illustrated Polish Courier in 1986, after more than 30 years of service: at that time, it was the longest service at this function in Poland.

== Personal life ==
Lassota was married: the couple had a son.

He died in 2004 and was buried in the parish cemetery on Wołuszewska Street in Ciechocinek.

Witold's aunt was Wanda Wermińska (1900-1988), a Polish operatic dramatic soprano and mezzo-soprano.

== Awards and decorations ==
Lassota was awarded, among others:

- the Officer's Cross of the Order of Polonia Restituta;
- the Order of the Banner of Labour, 1st Class;
- the Silver Cross of Merit with Swords by the government in exile. In 1990, the decoration was converted into the Cross of Valor;
- the Golden Cross of Merit (1955);
- the Medal of Victory and Freedom 1945;
- the Partisan Cross;
- the Medal of the 10th, 30th and 40th Anniversary of People's Poland;
- the Medal of the National Education Commission;
- the Golden Badge of Honour of the Polish-Soviet Friendship Association (1968).

== See also ==
- Bydgoszcz
- List of Polish people
- Korwin coat of arms
- Rawicz coat of arms
- Wanda Wermińska

== Bibliography ==
- Jędrzyński, Zefiryn (2007). Witold Lassota. Toruński Słownik Biograficzny [Witold Lassota. Toruń Biographical Dictionary] (in Polish). Toruń: Towarzystwo Miłośników Torunia. pp. 99–100.
- Witold Lassota. Kto jest kim w Polsce [Witold Lassota. Who's who in Poland] (in Polish). Warsawa: Wydawnictwo Interpress. 1984. p. 518.
- Interview with Witold Lassota: Szałkowski, Janusz (21 October 1985). Słowo przekazywane jest czymś więcej niż informacją. Kurier Polski nr 205 [The word conveyed is more than information. Kurier Polski nr 205] (in Polish). Warsawa: Stronnictwa Demokratycznego. p. 5.
