= Chojnacki =

Chojnacki (Polish pronunciation: [xɔi̯ˈnatski]; feminine: Chojnacka; plural: Chojnaccy) is a surname of Polish language origin. It may refer to:

- Elisabeth Chojnacka (1939–2017), Polish harpsichordist
- Fidelis Chojnacki (1906–1942), Polish friar
- Jack Chojnacki (born c. 1941), American businessman
- Jadwiga Chojnacka (1905–1992), Polish actress
- Małgorzata Chojnacka (canoeist) (born 1983), Polish sprint canoeist
- Marek Chojnacki (born 1959), Polish footballer
- Maria Chojnacka (1931–2020), Polish athlete
- Matt Chojnacki (born 1973), American freestyle skier
- Matthew Chojnacki (born 1975), American writer
- Piotr Chojnacki (1945–2026), Polish politician
- Roman Chojnacki (1875–1938), Polish conductor
