= Jan Długosz Award =

Polish literary prize

- Awarded for: literary award
- Country: Poland
- Presented by: International Book Fair in Kraków
- First award: 1998

The Jan Długosz Award (Polish: Nagroda im. Jana Długosza) is a Polish literary prize which has been presented annually since 1998 during the Kraków Book Fair. It is named in honor of Polish medieval chronicler Jan Długosz (1415–1480) and its aim is to popularize works in the field of humanities written by Polish authors and published the previous year which make significant contributions to the advancement of science and cultural enrichment. The award recognizes books not only targeted to the professional, scientific circles but also to the general reader, which is intended to make them the subject of a broader public debate. The winners of the award receive cash prizes and a statuette designed by sculptor Bronisław Chromy.

== List of Laureates ==
Year	Author	Title
2025	Piotr Kłodkowski	Azjatycka Wielka Gra. Indie i Azja Południowa w sporze o regionalną i globalną dominację w XX i XXI wieku
2024	Piotr Pytlakowski	Strefa niepamięci
2023	Konstanty Gebert	Ostateczne rozwiązania. Ludobójcy i ich dzieło
2022	Rafał Matyja	Miejski grunt. 250 lat polskiej gry z nowoczesnością
2021	Zbigniew Mentzel	Kołakowski. Czytanie świata. Biografia ("Kołakowski. Reading the World: A Biography")
2020	Michał Roch Kaczmarczyk	Aporia wolności. Krytyka teorii społecznej ("Aporia of Freedom. A Critique of Social Theory")
2019	Joanna Tokarska-Bakir	Pod klątwą. Społeczny portret pogromu kieleckiego ("Under the Curse. A Social Portrait of the Kielce Pogrom")
2018	Monika Bobako	Islamofobia jako technologia władzy. Studium z antropologii politycznej ("Islamophobia as a Technology of Power. A Study in Political Anthropology")
2017	Przemysław Czapliński	Poruszona mapa ("A Moved Map")
2016	Anna Machcewicz	Bunt. Strajki w Trójmieście. Sierpień 1980 ("Rebellion: Strikes in the Tri-City, August 1980")
2015	Michał Głowiński	Rozmaitości interpretacyjne. Trzydzieści szkiców ("Interpretational Varieties. Thirty Sketches")
2014	Grzegorz Niziołek	Polski teatr Zagłady ("The Polish Theatre of the Holocaust")
2013	Jerzy Holzer	Europa Zimnej Wojny ("Cold War Europe")
2012	Andrzej Friszke	Czas KOR-u. Jacek Kuroń a geneza Solidarności ("The Time of KOR. Jacek Kuroń and the Origin of the Solidarity")
2011	Hanna Świda-Ziemba	Młodzież PRL. Portrety pokoleń w kontekście historii ("The Youth of PRL - Portraits of Generations from a Historical Perspective")
2010	Mieczysław Nurek	Gorycz zwycięstwa ("The Bitterness of Victory")
2009	Teresa Chylińska	Karol Szymanowski i jego epoka ("Karol Szymanowski and His Era")
2008	Stanisław Mossakowski	Kaplica Zygmuntowska 1515–1533 ("Sigismund's Chapel 1515–1533")
2007	Jerzy Strzelczyk	Zapomniane narody Europy ("The Forgotten Nations of Europe")
2006	Piotr Piotrowski	Awangarda w cieniu Jałty. Sztuka w Europie Środkowo-Wschodniej w latach 1945–1989
2005	Mirosława Marody and Anna Giza-Poleszczuk	Przemiany więzi społecznych ("Changes in Social Relations")
2004	Wacław Hryniewicz	Nadzieja uczy inaczej ("Hope Teaches Differently")
2003	Teresa Kostkiewiczowa	Polski wiek świateł. Obszary swoistości
2002	Jan Błoński	Witkacy
2001	Stefan Swieżawski	Dzieje europejskiej filozofii klasycznej ("History of European Classical Philosophy")
2000	Eugeniusz Cezary Król	Propaganda i indoktrynacja narodowego socjalizmu w Niemczech 1919–1945 ("Propaganda and Indoctrination of the National Socialism in Germany 1919–1945")
1999	Mieczysław Tomaszewski	Chopin. Człowiek, Dzieło, Rezonans ("Chopin. The Man, His Work and Its Resonance")
1998	Barbara Skarga	Tożsamość i różnica. Eseje metafizyczne ("Identity and Difference. Metaphysical Essays")

== See also ==
- Gall Anonim
- Wincenty Kadłubek
- History of Poland
