= Lech Gardocki =

First President of the Supreme Court of Poland from 1998 to 2010

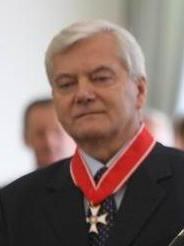
- In office 17 October 1998 – 18 October 2010
- Nominated by: Aleksander Kwaśniewski
- Preceded by: Adam Strzembosz
- Succeeded by: Stanisław Dąbrowski

Personal details
- Born: 13 April 1944 (age 82)
- Education: University of Warsaw

Lech Gardocki (born 13 April 1944) is a Polish lawyer, judge and former First President of the Supreme Court of Poland, a position he held from 1998 to 2010.

== Career ==
He graduated from the Faculty of Law at the University of Warsaw in 1966. In 1969 he passed the judicial exam. In 1971 he obtained a doctoral degree in legal sciences, he defended a thesis entitled Service crimes in the legislation of socialist countries. In 1979 he became a habilitated doctor in the field of criminal law based on the work entitled Issues of internationalization of criminal liability for offenses committed abroad.

In 1991 he was appointed an associate professor at the University of Warsaw. A year later he was awarded the title of professor of legal sciences by President Lech Wałęsa.

On 4 July 1996 he was appointed as a judge of the Supreme Court. On 17 October 1998 President Aleksander Kwaśniewski appointed him as the First President of the court. After his first term, he was appointed again then was replaced by Stanisław Dąbrowski in October 2010.
