= Małgorzata Manowska =

Polish academic and jurist

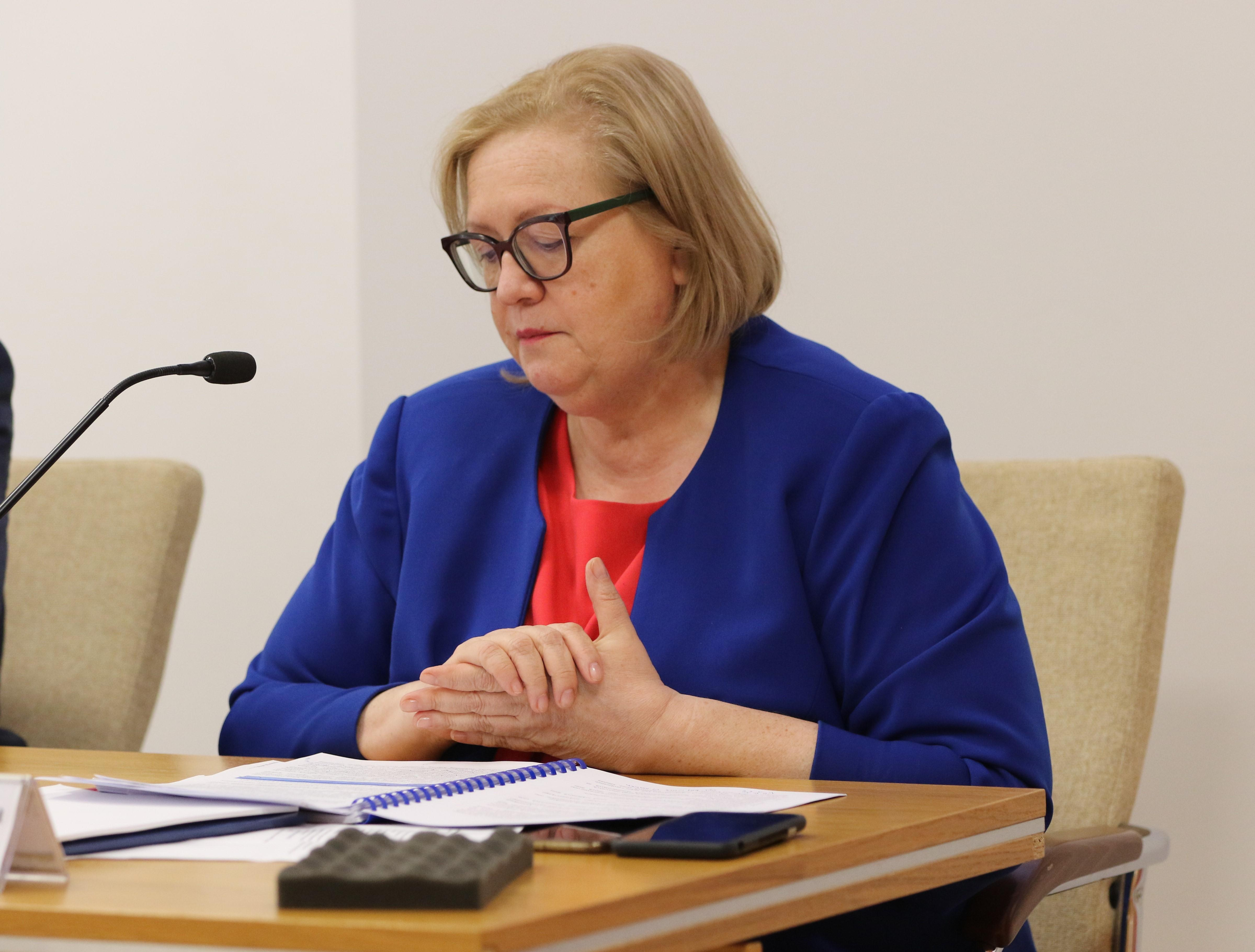

15th First President of the Supreme Court
- In office 26 May 2020 – 26 May 2026
- Nominated by: Andrzej Duda
- Preceded by: Małgorzata Gersdorf
- Succeeded by: Zbigniew Kapiński

Personal details
- Born: Małgorzata Soporek; September 22, 1964 (age 62) Warsaw, Poland
- Education: University of Warsaw

Małgorzata Manowska (born 22 September 1964) is a Polish academic and jurist who served as the First President of the Supreme Court and as the Chief Justice of the State Tribunal from 2020 until 2026. She is a past Dean of the National College of the Judiciary and a former Deputy Minister of Justice.

== Career ==
She holds a Master of Laws and a doctoral degree in jurisprudence from the University of Warsaw. In 2010 Manowska received her habilitation. She has been a lecturer at the University of Warsaw and Lazarski University, holding associate professorship at the latter. Manowska has authored numerous publications on civil, family and labor law.

Following several judicial appointments, including at the Court of Appeal in Warsaw, Manowska was nominated as the Deputy Minister of Justice, serving from 30 March to 27 November 2007. In 2016 she was selected as the Dean of the National College of the Judiciary.

On 10 October 2018, President Andrzej Duda appointed her as a Judge of the Supreme Court. She assumed the post of First President of the Supreme Court on 26 May 2020, succeeding Małgorzata Gersdorf. She concurrently became the Chief Justice of the State Tribunal. On 27 May 2026, she was succeeded by Zbigniew Kapiński.

== Controversy ==
She has been criticised for her bias towards the Law and Justice Party and has been accused of undermining the independence of the Supreme Court.
