= Antoni Gramatyka =

Polish painter (1841–1922)

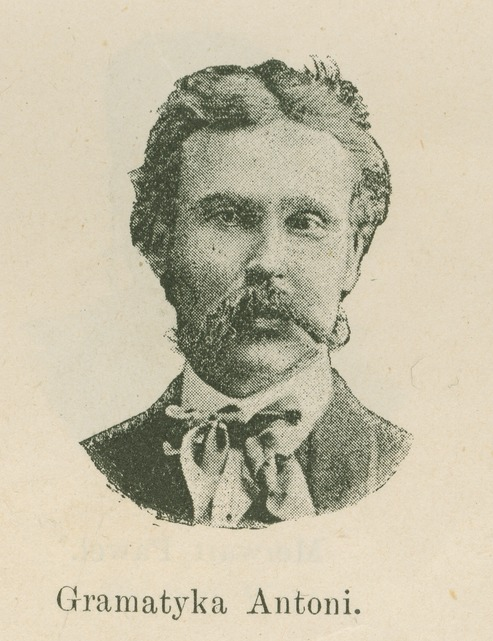
- Born: Antoni Gramatyka; 1841; Kalwaria Zebrzydowska, Poland
- Died: 23 May 1922; Kraków, Poland
- Known for: Painting
- Movement: Realism

Antoni Gramatyka (1841 – December 23, 1922) was a Polish painter, associated with Kraków and its surroundings.

== Biography ==
Gramatyka was born in Kalwaria Zebrzydowska. He began his studies at the Kraków Jan Matejko Academy of Fine Arts in 1870, where he was taught by Władysław Łuszczkiewicz and Jan Matejko. After their completion, he continued to study at the Academy of Fine Arts in Vienna, under Christian Ruben and Joseph von Führich. After returning from Vienna, Gramatyka continued his studies at the Jan Metjko Academy of Fine Arts in Kraków. Together with the Kraków Society of Friends of Fine Arts, he exhibited his works in Kraków and Lwów.

As a Realist, he presented day-to-day life of the locals in Kraków and surrounding villages. He painted landscape paintings of Kalwaria Zebrzydowska, Żywiecczyzna, Podhale, Spisz and the areas surrounding Kraków. Apart from landscapes, Gramatyka also painted portraits and church polychromes, inter alia in the Płock Cathedral. He worked on renovation and conservation projects, inter alia in Queen Sophia's Chapel on the Wawel and St. Mary's Basilica in Kraków. Gramatyka died in 1922 in Kraków.

== Gallery ==
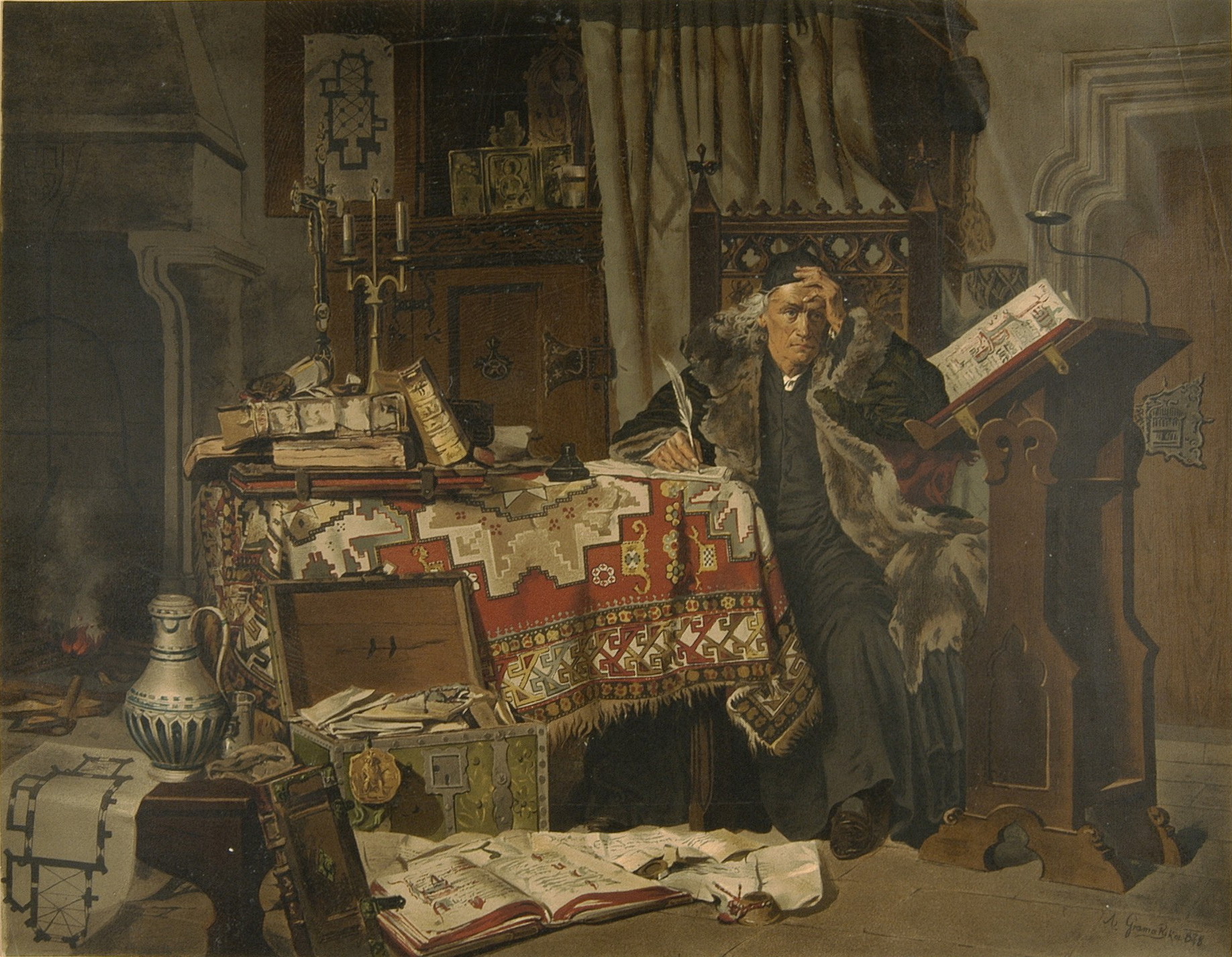
Jan Długosz
(1878)

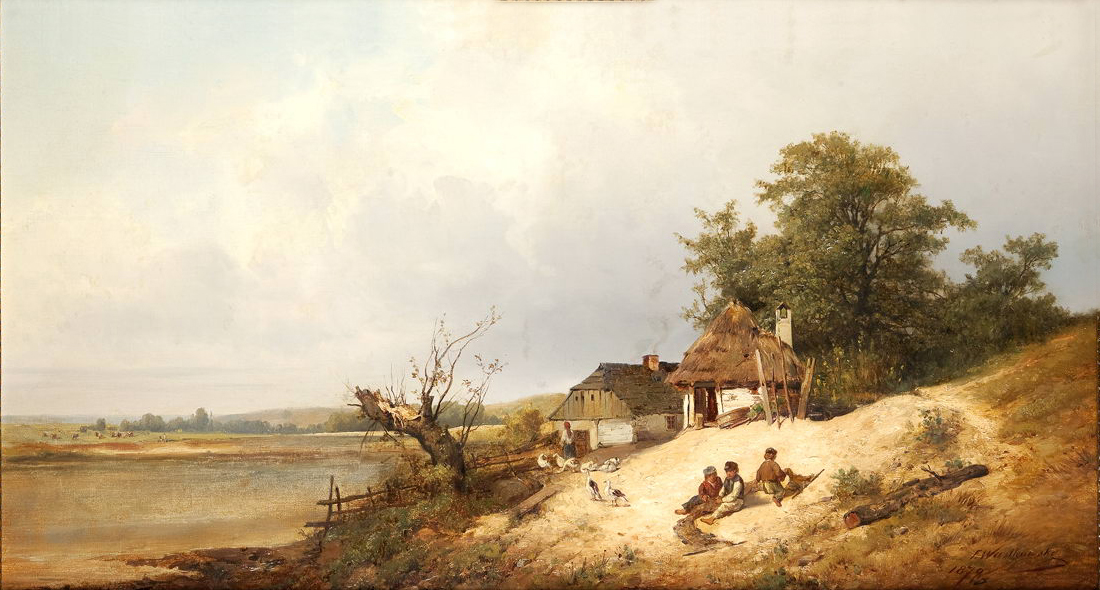
Landscape
(1880)

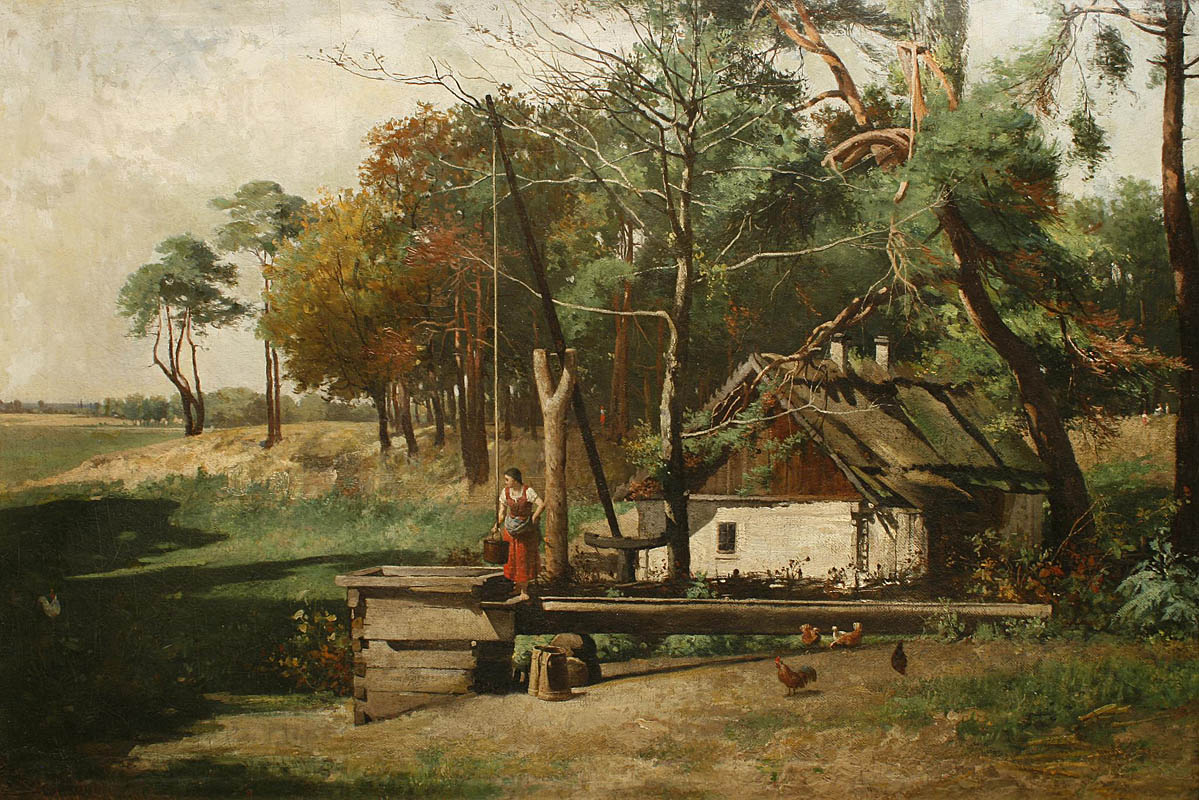
Village landscape
(1880)

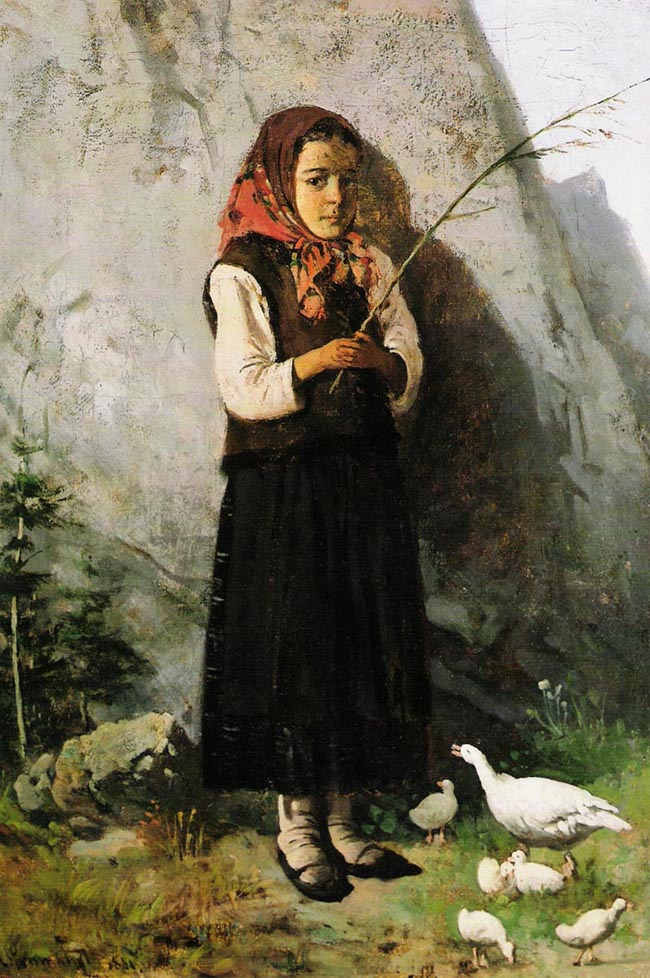
Goosewoman
(1881)
