= Stara Brzeźnica =

- Village
- Location within Poland
- Coordinates: 51°4′9″N 19°10′10″E
- Country: Poland
- Voivodeship: Łódź Voivodeship
- County: Pajęczno
- Gmina: Nowa Brzeźnica
- Population: 443

Stara Brzeźnica [ˈstara bʐɛʑˈnit͡sa] is a village in the administrative district of Gmina Nowa Brzeźnica, within Pajęczno County, Łódź Voivodeship, in central Poland.

== Notable residents ==
Jan Długosz (1415–1480), priest, chronicler, and diplomat.
