= Anna Bogucka-Skowrońska =

Polish politician and lawyer

Anna Teresa Bogucka-Skowrońska (born 23 February 1942 in Radom ) is a Polish politician, lawyer, senator of the Polish Parliament of the 1st, 2nd and 4th terms, former judge of the State Tribunal for 2 terms.

== Awards and decorations ==
- 2016: Cross of Freedom and Solidarity
- 2009: Commander's Cross of the Order of Polonia Restituta
- 2002: Officer's Cross of the Order of Polonia Restituta
