= Lech Krzysztof Paprzycki =

Polish lawyer and politician (1947–2022)

First President of the Supreme Court of Poland (acting)
- In office 9 January 2014 – 30 April 2014
- Preceded by: Stanisław Dąbrowski
- Succeeded by: Małgorzata Gersdorf

President of the Criminal Chamber of the Supreme Court of Poland
- In office 1999–2016
- Preceded by: Zbigniew Doda
- Succeeded by: Stanisław Zabłocki

Member of the Sejm
- In office 1989–1991

Personal details
- Born: 14 April 1947 Warka, Poland
- Died: 1 October 2022 (aged 75)
- Party: PSL
- Education: University of Warsaw
- Occupation: Lawyer

Lech Krzysztof Paprzycki (14 April 1947 – 1 October 2022) was a Polish lawyer and politician.

== Life and career ==
He became a judge in 1974. He was a judge of the Supreme Court from 1990 to 2016 and President of the Criminal Chamber from 1999 to 2016, acting as First President of the Supreme Court from January to April 2014. A member of the United People's Party, he served in the Sejm from 1989 to 1991.

Paprzycki died on 1 October 2022, at the age of 75.
