= Andrzej Grabiński =

- Died: Warsaw
- Education: University of Warsaw
- Known for: prosecution of the murderers of Father Jerzy Popiełuszko during the Toruń trial

Andrzej Grabiński (24 May 1922 in Utracie – 5 April 2006 in Warsaw) was a Polish lawyer, defender in political trials during the Polish People's Republic, activist of the KSS "KOR", advisor to the NSZZ "Solidarność", auxiliary prosecutor in the trial of the perpetrators of the murder of Father Jerzy Popiełuszko.

== Early life and education ==
Andrzej Grabiński was born in Utracie (from 1926 Piastów), in the family of an employee of the Polish State Railways. During his school years, he belonged to a youth organisation associated with the National Radical Camp, during the occupation he was a soldier of the Lizard Union and the National Armed Forces. He worked in railway workshops and at the same time began studying law at the Secret University of Warsaw. He graduated after the war in the late 1940s.

== Career ==
In the first post-war years, he worked at PKP in the Olsztyn Voivodeship. From 1955, he was associated with the Krzywe Koło Club. After completing his legal apprenticeship in the 1950s, he was a defender in political trials in the following decades. Together with Stanisław Szczuka, he appeared in the trial of Wojciech Ziembiński, and together with Andrzej Bąkowski, he defended Henryk Wujec in the trial of KOR activists. He was a defender in the trials of students distributing an Open Letter to members of the Polish United Workers' Party in 1965, participants of the March events (including Jan Lityński and Seweryn Blumsztajn), workers from Radom and Ursus in 1976, priests, members of the Light-Life Movement, persecuted Lemkos and Lithuanians from Puńsk, and Jehovah's Witnesses. From 1977, he collaborated regularly with the Intervention Office of the KSS "KOR."

After the formation of the Solidarity trade union, he became an advisor to the Mazovia Region. During martial law, he was active in the Primate's Committee for Aid to Persons Deprived of Liberty and Their Families, organizing assistance for the Solidarity Resistance Groups and the union's outlawed factory committees. In 1984–1985, he participated in the trial of the perpetrators of the murder of Father Jerzy Popiełuszko as an auxiliary prosecutor.

He was active in the Supreme Bar Council and the Polish Lawyers' Association, and was a member of the Polish Veterans' Association. In 1997, he retired from active professional activity due to health reasons.

== Death ==
He died on 5 April 2006, in Warsaw and was buried at the Powązki Military Cemetery.

== Awards and honours ==
He was posthumously awarded the Commander's Cross with Star of the Order of Polonia Restituta.

== Bibliography ==
- Andrzej Bąkowski: Adwokat Andrzej Grabiński. „Palestra. Pismo Adwokatury Polskiej”. 1–2/2007. 0031–0344.
- Pro memoria: Ś.p. Andrzej Grabiński. „Glaukopis. Pismo Społeczno-Historyczne”. Nr 5–6. ISSN 1730-3419.
