= National Council of the Judiciary (Poland) =

Polish constitutional judiciary authority

- Krajowa Rada Sądownictwa; KRS

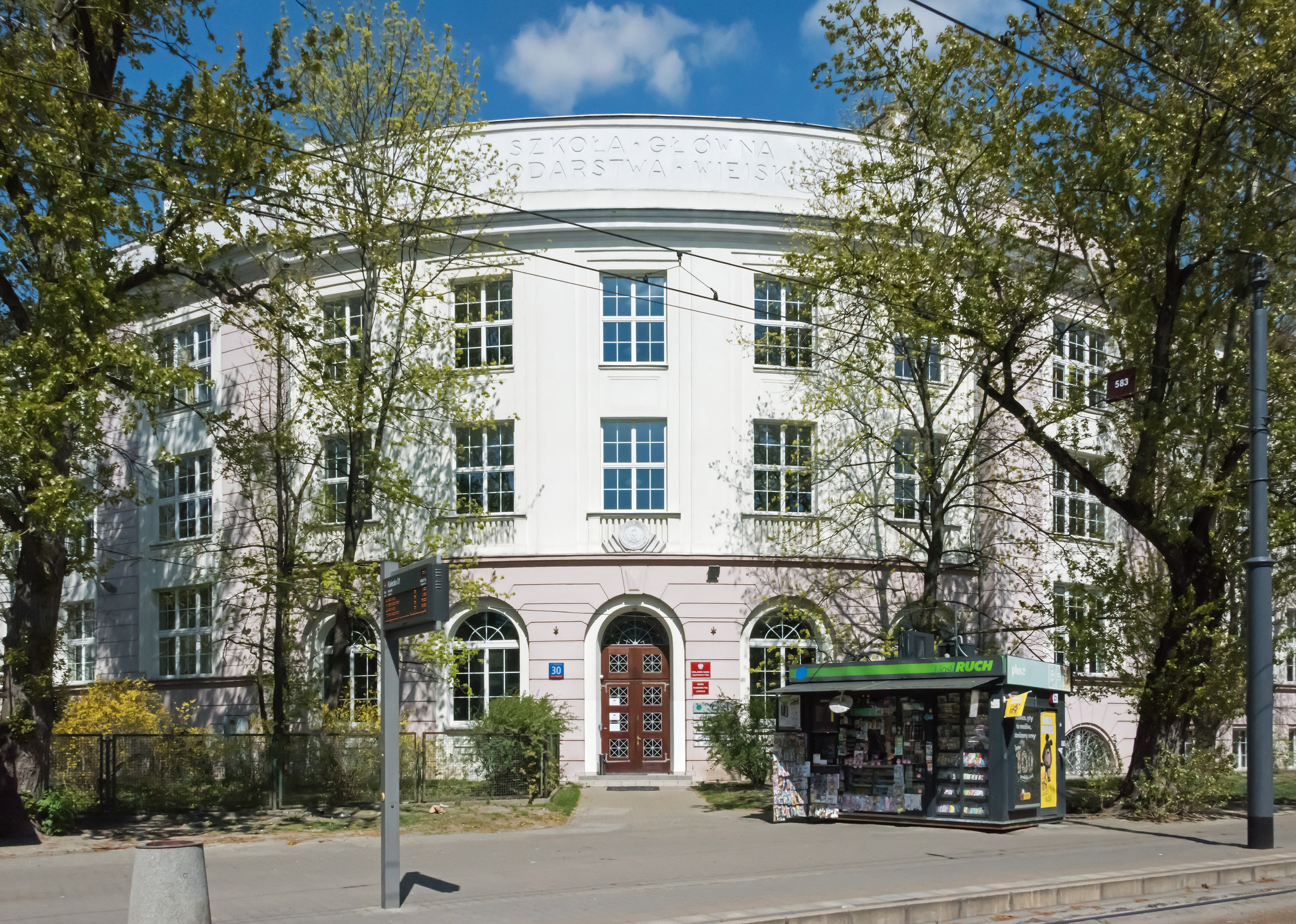

Agency overview
- Formed: 1989; 37 years ago
- Jurisdiction: Poland
- Headquarters: Warsaw
- Website: www.krs.pl/pl/

The National Council of the Judiciary (Polish: Krajowa Rada Sądownictwa) is the national council of the judiciary of Poland. It is a public body in Poland responsible for nominating judges and reviewing ethical complaints against sitting jurists.

== Establishment and composition ==
The National Council of the Judiciary is a constitutional organ appointed to safeguard the independence of courts and judges. It is a collective organ, composed of representatives of the judiciary (the First President of the Supreme Court, the President of the High Administrative Court and 15 representatives of the judiciary's self-governments appointed for a four-year term of office), the legislative (four deputies and two senators chosen for a four-year term of office) and the executive (the Minister of Justice and an individual appointed by the President of the Republic). The Council presents the President with motions concerning the appointment of judges; it deals with judiciary's staff matters, and expresses its opinions on the professional ethic of judges. It may also make an application to the Constitutional Tribunal to adjudicate on the constitutional conformity of normative acts to the extent to which they concern the independence of courts and judges.

The National Council of the Judiciary was established in 1989, a process of intense social and political changes related to the “Round Table” talks began in Poland, which led to significant constitutional changes, including the area of judicial bodies. Already in April 1989, on the basis of the April amendment to the Constitution of the Polish People's Republic, the National Council of the Judiciary was introduced, which gained the right to present candidates for judges to the President. At the end of 1989, as a result of the revision of the Constitution of the Polish People's Republic, the traditional name of the state was restored – the Republic of Poland, which according to art. 1 of the Constitution was defined as a democratic state of law. In particular, it allowed the Constitutional Tribunal to interpret from this provision many norms characterizing the system of states referring to the concept of the rule of law. The revision introduced also into Art. 56 sec. 1 of the Constitution, division of judicial authorities into the Supreme Court, common courts and special courts. In 1992 in the subsequently adopted Small Constitution the principle of uniformity of state power was replaced by the principle of the division of powers, and independent courts were made state authorities in the area of judicial power (Art. 1). At the same time works on a new full constitution were in progress. These works ended with the enactment of the Constitution of 2 April 1997, which entered into force on 17 October 1997, and which remains in force until today. The Constitution in force creates a formal framework for the full independence of the judiciary, which it makes a separate authority and which includes courts and tribunals (Art. 10 and 173). The courts that deal with justice include the Supreme Court, common courts, administrative courts and military courts. The Polish tribunals are the Constitutional Tribunal and the State Tribunal. The Constitution also provides for full formal guarantees of judges’ independence, who are appointed by the President at the request of the National Council of the Judiciary. The Polish constitutional regulations regarding the third authority also refer to European standards in the field of the judiciary, including the relevant case law of the European Court of Human Rights. These regulations, as well as the practice of their application, did not constitute an obstacle to Poland's accession to the European Union in 2004. The Polish judiciary should be generally assessed as meeting the requirements of the rule of law principle and international and European standards in this area.

The National Council of the Judiciary has 25 members: a representative of the President of Poland, the Minister of Justice, six members of parliament elected by it to serve four-year terms, the First President of the Supreme Court of Poland, the First President of the Supreme Administrative Court of Poland, and 15 judges elected by the "self-governments" to four-year terms. (Note: The "self-governments" refer to two judges associations: the general assembly of regional court judges and the general assembly of court of appeal judges.)

The council was established in Articles 186 and 187 of the Constitution of Poland. As of 2022 Dagmara Pawełczyk-Woicka was chairman of the National Council of the Judiciary.

== Authority ==
The National Council of the Judiciary is responsible for nominating judges to fill judicial vacancies; formal appointment is then made by the President of Poland.

== Criticism and reform ==
In 2017 the Council of Europe criticized the inclusion of only six women members on the 25-member National Council of the Judiciary, and also the fact that the 15 self-elected judges served "joint" terms, meaning all 15 are replaced en masse every four years. According to the Council of Europe, this threatened the National Council of the Judiciary's continuity. Representatives of the governing Law and Justice Party also criticized the council for nominating judges it claimed privileged their personal political ideologies to protect former officials of communist-era Poland.

=== 2017 restructuring ===
Under a 2017 draft law aimed at reforming the National Council of the Judiciary, the 15 judges nominated by the self-governments would, instead, be elected by the Sejm. On 22 July, the upper chamber of parliament approved the draft law by a vote of 55–23 with two abstentions. President Andrzej Duda vetoed the draft law.

In November 2017 an updated version of the law was proposed, and was supported by parliament in December. The European Union criticised the law. Duda immediately signed the law.

==== Reaction ====
On 20 December, the European Union imposed "unprecedented disciplinary measures against Poland" over a series of other laws enacted which it claimed allowed the government to "interfere significantly" with the judiciary. The decision of the European Commission to call for implementation of Article 7 of the Treaty of the European Union marked the first time the process for stripping an EU member state of its voting rights had been initiated in the history of the European Union.

An opinion poll found that 63-percent of Poles thought "the judiciary needs to make some serious changes". A separate poll by the TVN network in the summer of 2017 found that 55-percent of respondents said President Andrzej Duda should veto the then-proposed changes with 29-percent wanting him to sign them. Paweł Kukiz, leader of Kukiz'15 – parliament's third-largest party – said he believed "the Polish judiciary requires 'thorough reforms and profound personnel changes'" and would not oppose the legislation, though also expressed doubt that it could deliver meaningful reform.

The legislation was criticized by some who noted that all 15 currently serving judges on the National Council of the Judiciary would be removed and replaced using the new procedure, effectively giving the governing party the ability to select those members. Domestic criticism of the legislation came from leading politicians of the opposition Civic Platform. Donald Tusk and Andrzej Rzepliński also both called on the Polish government to scrap the proposed changes, as did Amnesty International and the Council of Europe. Several protests in Poland against the legislation drew crowds of "tens of thousands" with one demonstration attended by former president Lech Wałęsa. In the US, the first Trump Administration stated that the legislation would "undermine judicial independence and weaken the rule of law in Poland".

The legislation was supported by several leading Polish political figures including prime minister Beata Szydło, former All-Polish Youth president Adam Andruszkiewicz, Law and Justice Party leader Jarosław Kaczyński, Zdzisław Krasnodębski MEP, and others. Some members of Kukiz'15 joined the governing Law and Justice Party in backing the proposal. International support for Poland's position came from Hungary with prime minister Viktor Orbán stating that "the inquisition offensive against Poland can never succeed because Hungary will use all legal options in the European Union to show solidarity with the Poles".

== See also ==
Polish Constitutional Tribunal crisis (2015 – ongoing)
