= Małgorzata Gersdorf =

Polish lawyer and judge

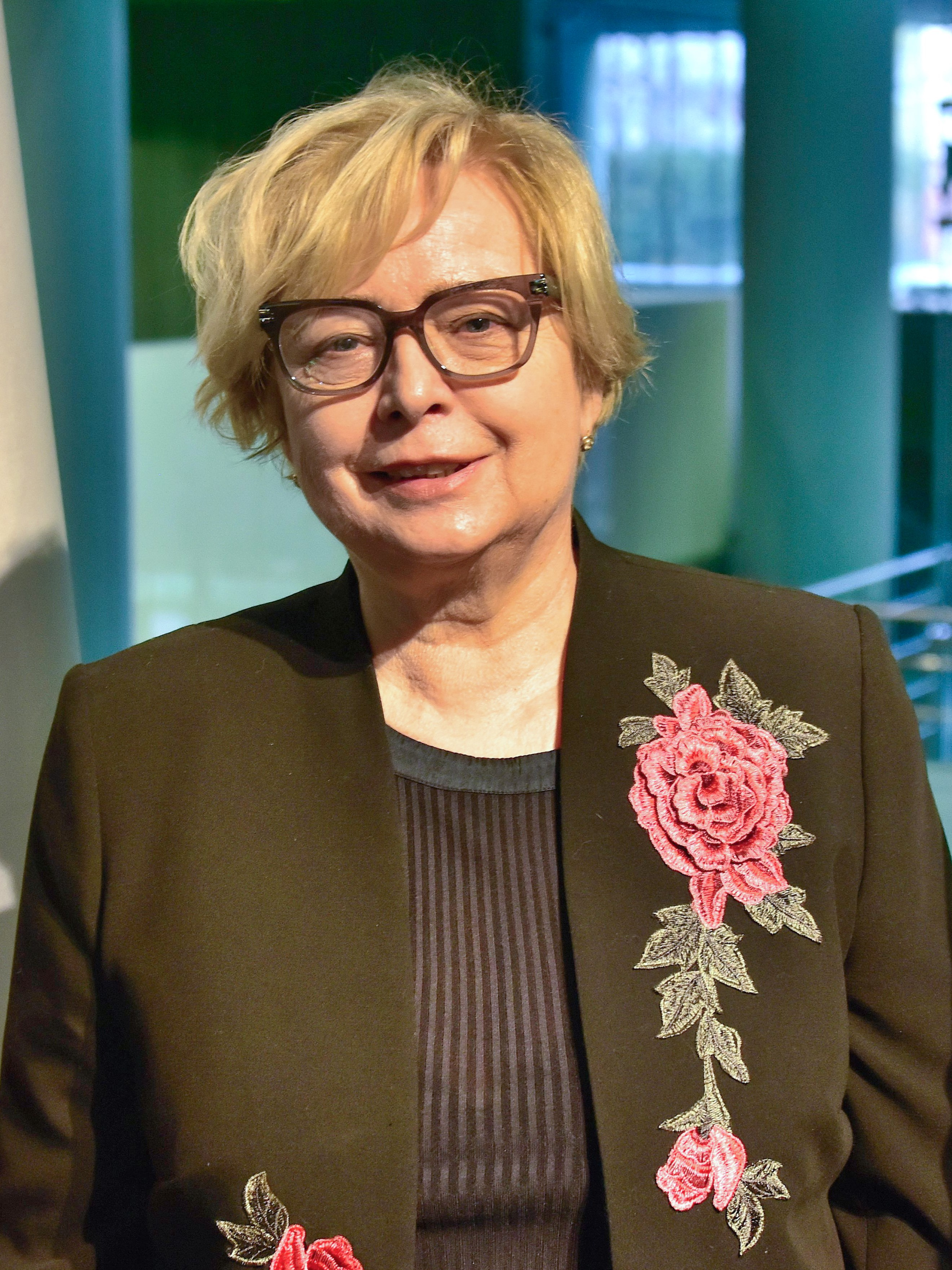
- Gersdorf in 2018

14th First President of the Supreme Court
- In office 30 April 2014 – 30 April 2020
- Nominated by: Bronisław Komorowski
- Preceded by: Stanisław Dąbrowski
- Succeeded by: Małgorzata Manowska

Personal details
- Born: 22 November 1952 (age 73) Warsaw, Poland
- Spouse: Bohdan Zdziennicki
- Education: University of Warsaw

Małgorzata Maria Gersdorf (Polish: [mawgɔ'ʐata 'gɛrsdɔrf]; born 22 November 1952) is a Polish lawyer and judge who served as the First President of the Supreme Court of Poland. She was appointed in 2014 and her six-year term ended on 30 April 2020.

== Biography ==
She graduated from the University of Warsaw with a law degree in 1975, and obtained a doctorate degree in 1981. She became a professor for the University of Warsaw in 1992, served as Vice-Rector of the University in 2005, and became head of the Law Department in 2008.

Politically, Gersdorf was part of the Solidarity movement in the 1980s, and worked in the Supreme Court Office of Jurisprudence and the Office of Supreme Court Analysis in the 1990s. In 1989, after the new post-communist government took over, she was appointed to the Social Conciliation Commission, which helped to get political prisoners back in the workforce. She served as a legal advisor to the Supreme Court, and in 2008 was nominated to be a Judge. She served in that role for six years when she was nominated to be the First President of the Supreme Court, succeeding Stanisław Dąbrowski, who had died earlier in 2014, and Lech Krzysztof Paprzycki, who was an acting First President.

After becoming First President of the Supreme Court, in 2017 the Law and Justice (PiS) party had planned to change the court's structure, including the party nominating its own justices rather than having judges nominate them. In an open letter to colleagues, Gersdorf spoke out against this push, stating that "the courts are easily turned into a plaything in the hands of politicians" and urging fellow judges to preserve the independence of the judiciary. The law was later passed in both legislative chambers but was vetoed by President Andrzej Duda.

The Law and Justice party continued to seek significant changes to the court's system; one measure was to enact mandatory retirement starting on 4 July 2018, which would force Gersdorf and 26 other judges out of the 72 judges in the court to retire, despite the court justices having previously voted in favor of allowing themselves to continue to run until the end of their term. Gersdorf and several of her colleagues are fighting this measure. Backed by public protests, Gersdorf has continued to show up for work, saying that the government is attempting "a purge of the Supreme Court conducted under the guise of retirement reform" and noting that under the Constitution of Poland, her term continues through 2020. The European Commission filed an infringement procedure against the Polish government, stating that the law undermines judicial independence and therefore was a breach of the Treaty on European Union and Charter of Fundamental Rights of the European Union, which protect the rule of law. She was ultimately succeeded by Małgorzata Manowska, a PiS ally in May 2020 as First President of the Supreme Court.

In January 2021 she was awarded the Geuzenpenning, a Dutch prize for people fighting for democracy and against dictatorship, racism and discrimination.
