= Wanda Wermińska =

Polish operatic sorano

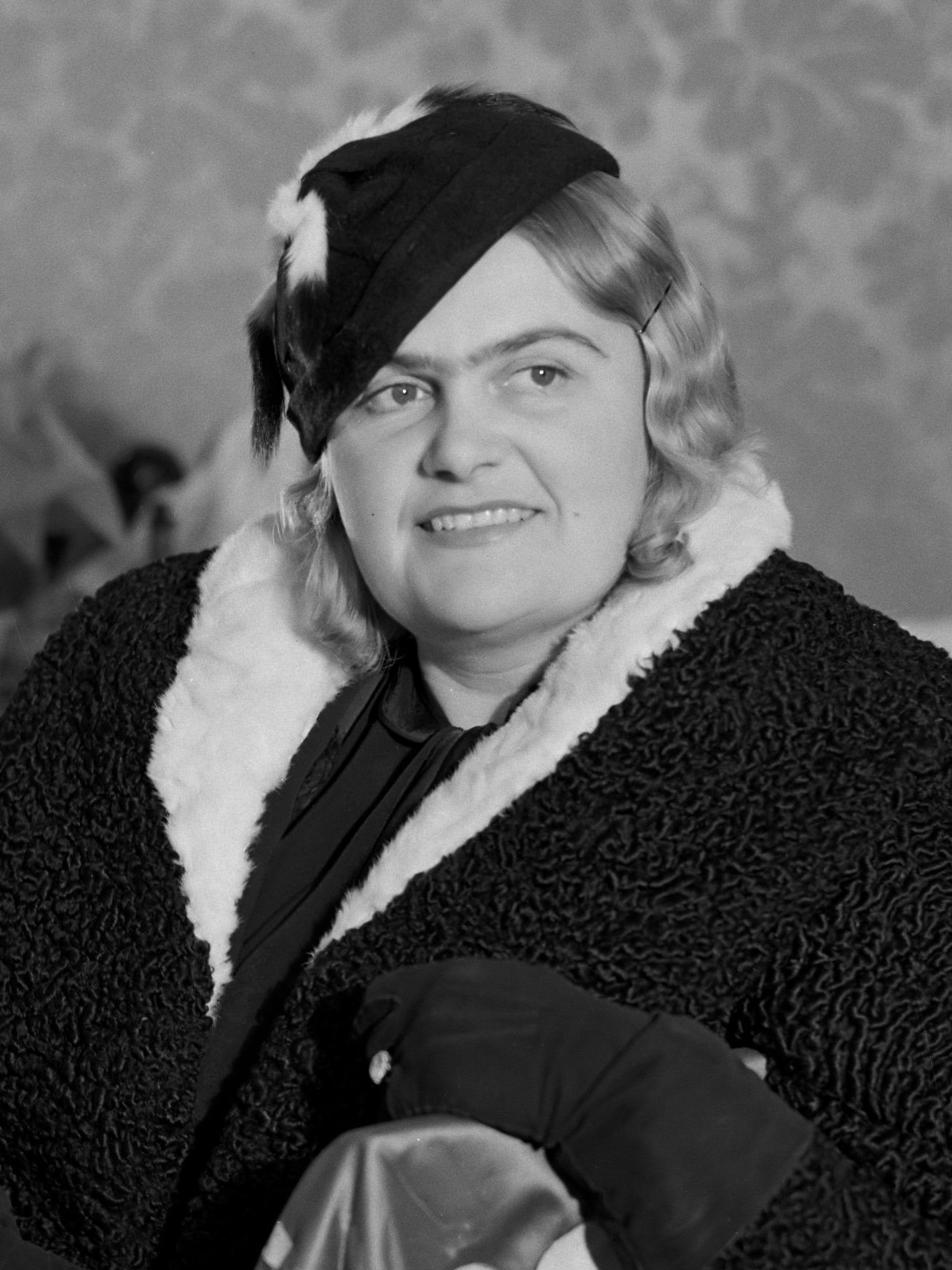
- Born: 18 November 1900; Bloshchyntsi, Kiev Governorate, Russian Empire (present day in Kyiv Oblast, Ukraine)
- Died: 30 August 1988 (aged 87); Warsaw, Poland
- Occupation: Opera singer

Wanda Wermińska (18 November 1900 – 30 August 1988) was a Polish operatic dramatic soprano and mezzo-soprano.

== Life ==
Wermińska was born in Bloshchyntsi (present day in Kyiv Oblast, Ukraine), studied at the Polish gymnasium in Kyiv and later with his family emigrated to Warsaw. Here she was discovered by the conductor Artur Rodziński, made her operatic debut in 1923 at the Grand Theatre, Warsaw as Amneris in Verdi's Aida with great success. For the role of Carmen in Bizet's opera, she took dance lessons with the flamenco dancer La Argentina. In operas such as Il trovatore, Un ballo in maschera, Don Carlos, Fidelio, Le nozze di Figaro, Andrea Chénier, Lohengrin, Tannhäuser, Die Walküre and Halka she took on more than forty roles in the mezzo-soprano and soprano genres in the 1920s.

In 1929, Wermińska left Poland and made guest appearances in Vienna, Berlin, Bucharest, Prague, Riga, Stockholm, Copenhagen, Milan, Rome, Venice, Madrid and Alexandria, among other places. In Budapest she appeared alongside Feodor Chaliapin in Faust, which invited her to perform in Boris Godunov at several European theatres.

During the period of the Second World War, Wermińska lived in South America, where she had engagements in Argentina (Teatro Colón), Brazil, Chile and Mexico, under the conductors Bruno Walter Fritz Busch and Wilhelm Furtwängler and with soloists such as Kirsten Flagstad, Maria Caniglia, Fedora Barbieri, Beniamino Gigli, Lily Pons and Mario del Monaco.

She returned to Poland in 1947, where she continued to perform as an opera and concert singer, also on radio and television, and worked as a music teacher. She was highly regarded as the "Mother of Polish Opera".

== Awards ==
- Medal of the 40th Anniversary of People's Poland (1984).
- Order of Polonia Restituta (1955).
- Order of the White Lion (Czechoslovakia, 1933).
- Order of the Estonian Red Cross (Estonia, 1936).
