= Jan Szeliga =

Jan Szeliga (Latin: Ioannis Szeligae; ?–1636, Lviv) was a Polish book printer operating in Polish–Lithuanian Commonwealth. In particular, he worked in Kraków, Lviv, Dobromyl, Yavoriv, Jarosław, i.e., spending much time in Galicia (Eastern Europe), now Ukraine.
