= Supreme Court of Poland =

Highest court in Poland

- Polish: Sąd Najwyższy
- Interactive map of Supreme Court of Poland
- Established: September 1, 1917; 109 years ago
- Jurisdiction: Poland
- Location: Warsaw
- Composition method: Presidential nomination
- Authorised by: Constitution of Poland
- Number of positions: 120 (by statute)
- Website: sn.pl

First President of the Supreme Court
- Currently: Zbigniew Kapiński
- Since: May 27, 2026; 5 months ago

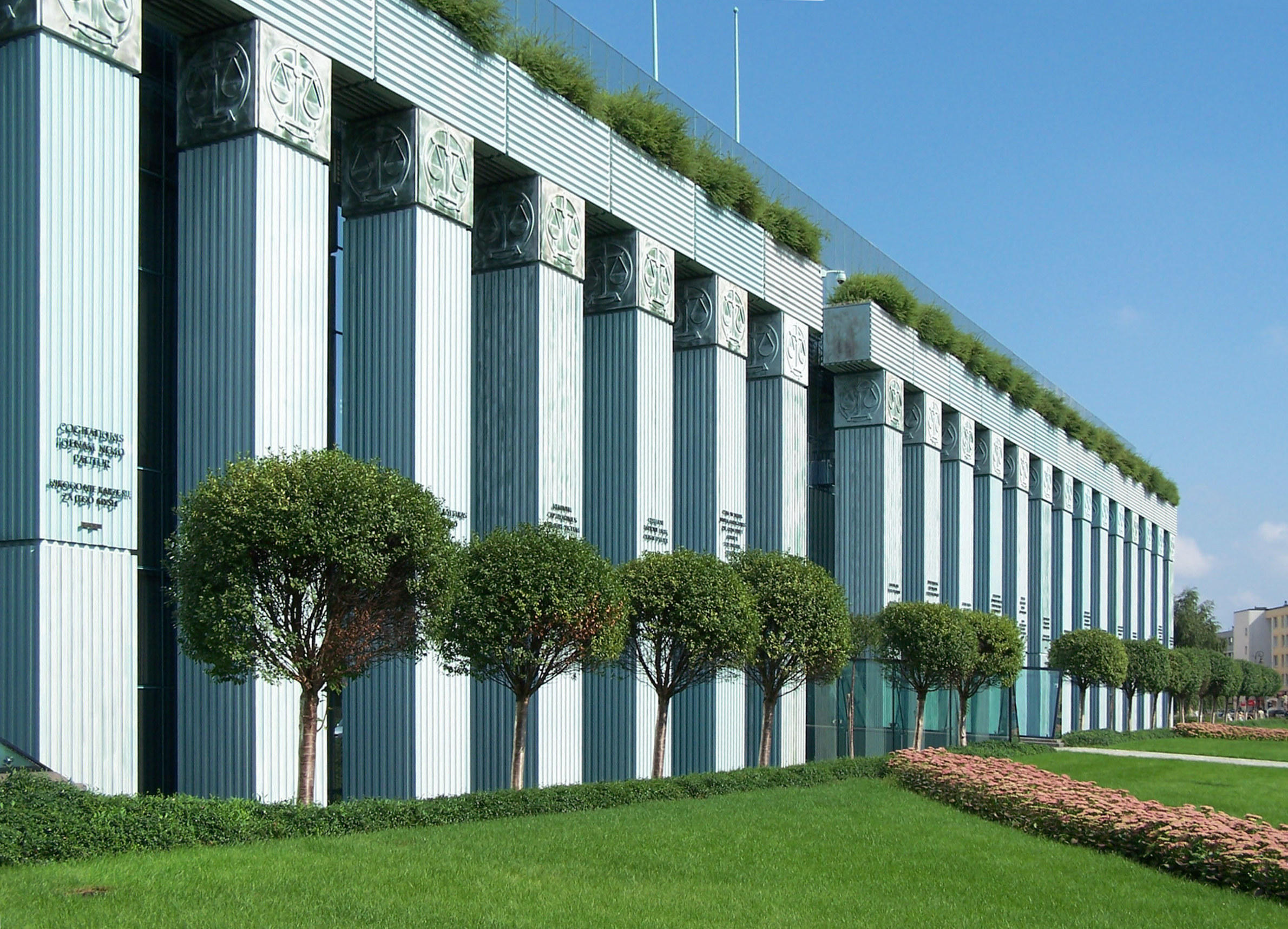
The Supreme Court building, Warsaw

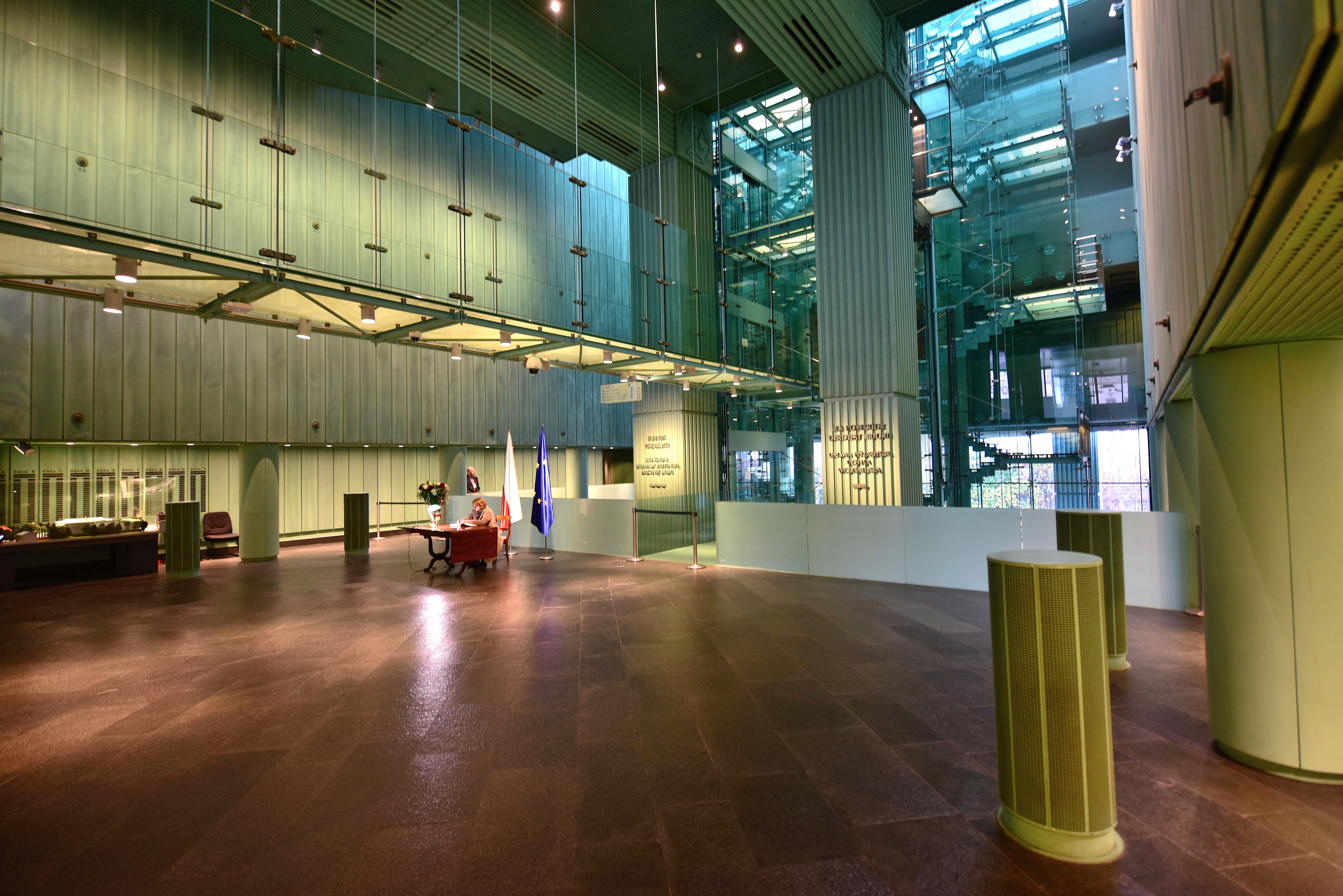
Hall of the Supreme Court building, Warsaw

The Supreme Court (Polish: Sąd Najwyższy [ˈsɔnt najˈvɘʂ.ʂɘ]) is the highest court in the Republic of Poland. It is located in the Krasiński Square, Warsaw.

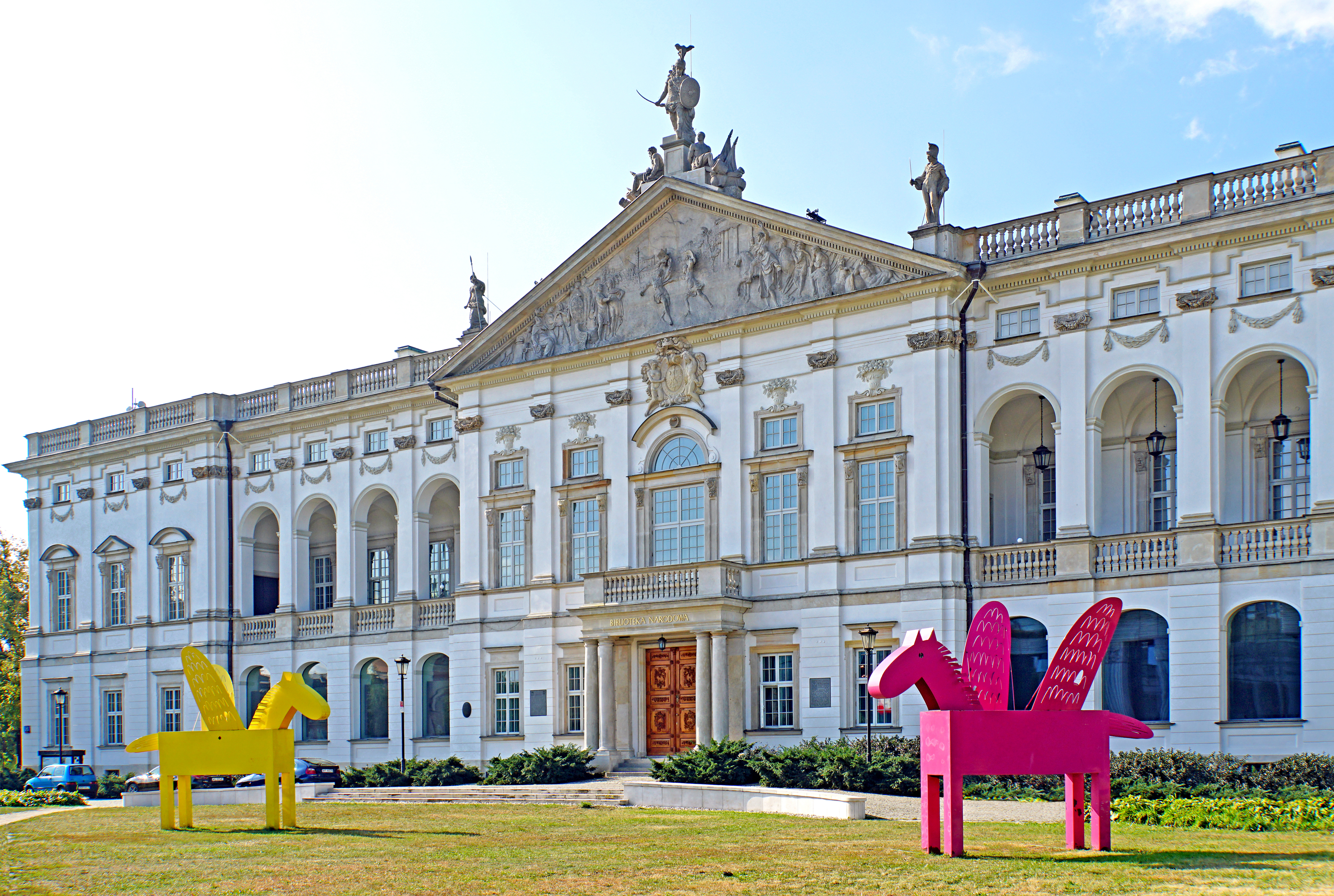
Krasiński Palace, location of the Court in 1917–1939

The legal basis for the competence and activities of the Supreme Court is the Polish Constitution, the Act on the Supreme Court and the Presidential Decree on the organisation of the Supreme Court.

== History ==
=== Twentieth century ===
The Supreme Court followed on from the Court of Cassation of the Principality of Warsaw. It began its work in 1917 during the First World War as the Royal Imperial Supreme Court (Polish: Królewsko-Cesarski Sąd Najwyższy). Pomian-Srzednicki was appointed the first president of the court. After Poland gained full independence in 1918, the Supreme Court was reformed by decree of 8 February 1919 and many judges who were considered to be loyal to the emperor were dismissed.

After the German invasion of Poland, the Supreme Court ceased its work. After the Second World War, the Supreme Court was reinstated with new judges who were now in line with the Soviet leadership. Its powers were reorganised by laws adopted in 1962 and 1984. At the turn of 1989 the Supreme Court was dissolved and re-established, but for the most part with the old judges from the communist era.

=== Twenty-first century ===
In 2002 a new legal basis for the organisation of the Supreme Court was created, replacing the old one of 1984.

==== 2015–present Polish rule-of-law crisis ====
In 2017 the Polish government passed the Polish Supreme Court Disciplinary Chamber law, which would have forced all Supreme Court judges into mandatory retirement apart from those granted an extension by the Minister of Justice. The bill was passed in the Polish Sejm and the Senate however following mass protests against the bill it was ultimately vetoed by President Andrzej Duda on 24 June 2017. A revised bill reduced mandatory retirement age of judges from 70 to 65. The bill was later signed by President Duda and came into force in July 2018. The law effectively retires 40% of the Supreme Court bench including the First President of the Supreme Court, Malgorzata Gersdorf.

The law created a new chamber of the Supreme Court, the Discplinary Chamber, which would give the government of Poland the right to fire or reduce the salary of judges who criticised legislation relating to the judiciary or judicial appointments.

Polish opposition parties, the European Commission, the European Parliament, the Polish Supreme Court, and the National Council of the Judiciary claimed that the law is unconstitutional because it violates the principles of the independence of the judiciary. In August 2018 the Supreme Court sent questions to the European Court of Justice (ECJ) regarding the reforms. Under Union law the court can prevent the Polish law from coming into force if it undermines the treaties of the European Union regarding judicial independence.

On 17 December 2018, President Duda signed a law to reinstate the judges who had been forced out of their jobs.

On 8 April 2020 the ECJ ruled in the court case Commission v Poland that the state of Poland "had failed to fulfill its obligations under EU law". As a result, the Court granted "the Commission's application for interim measures" which will likely be realised with monetary fines.

On 12 October 2020, Adam Tomczyński, a Judge from the Disciplinary Chamber, waived the immunity of Beata Morawiec, judge of the District Court in Kraków. Moments after that the European Association of Judges expressed its unbreakable solidarity to Judge Beata Morawiec and to all independent Polish judges and once again stated that "The Disciplinary Chamber of the Polish Supreme Court is not a court and cannot continue to act as one" and urges the European Commission to take all necessary measures to urgently reestablish the EU legal order in Poland.

In July 2021, in the case Reczkowicz v. Poland, the European Court of Human Rights (ECtHR) ruled that the Disciplinary Chamber was, as summarised by the International Commission of Jurists, "not a legitimate tribunal established by law due to impermissible political interference in the appointment of its judges by the Executive and Legislative powers".

In July 2022, the Disciplinary Chamber was replaced by a new chamber, the Professional Responsibility Chamber (Polish: Izba Odpowiedzialności Zawodowej), based on a June 2022 law updating the structure of the Supreme Court. In July 2026, Maria Szczepaniec was appointed as head of the chamber. Rzeczpospolita described the Professional Responsibility Chamber as "questioned by some jurists".

== Function ==
The Supreme Court supervises the adjudication in:

- General courts: these are district, circuit, and appeal courts. They adjudicate in the areas of civil, criminal, family and labour law.
- Military courts: these are circuit and garrison courts. They deal with matters relating to crimes committed by soldiers in active service, civilian employees in military units, and prisoners of war.

The Supreme Court is the court of last resort of appeal against judgements in the lower courts (except for administrative courts). It also passes resolutions to clarify specific legal provisions and resolve disputable questions in specific cases. These however are not (at least technically) legally binding.

=== Chambers ===
In 2019, the Supreme Court had chambers for civil matters, criminal matters, labour and social security matters, exceptional supervision and public matters, and disciplinary matters.

The Disciplinary Chamber was created in 2017 by the Polish Supreme Court Disciplinary Chamber law during the Polish rule-of-law crisis, and found to be illegitimate by the European Court of Human Rights in 2021 due to executive and legislative interference. In a law of June 2022, the Disciplinary Chamber was replaced by a new chamber, the Professional Responsibility Chamber (Polish: Izba Odpowiedzialności Zawodowej).

== Appointment of judges ==
The President of Poland appoints Supreme Court judges for an indefinite period. This is done upon a motion of the National Council of the Judiciary. The President also selects the First President of the court from candidates presented by the General Assembly of the Supreme Court. The First President holds office for a six-year term. The First President may be dismissed by the Sejm upon a motion by the President if found convicted of a crime.

In July 2018 a new law came into force which lowers the mandatory retirement age from 70 to 65. The introduction of this law is contested and the constitutionality of the law is being assessed. Critics have argued the law is aimed at removing non-pliant judges and installing appointees desired by the current government, led by the Law and Justice party.

There are 120 posts for judges.

== List of First Presidents of the Supreme Court ==
| No | Name | Image | In office | | Term length | Notes |
Republic of Poland
| 1. | Stanisław Pomian-Srzednicki | | 1 September 1917 – 28 February 1922 | | 4 years, 180 days | |
| 2. | Franciszek Nowodworski | | 1 March 1922 – 3 August 1924 | | 2 years, 155 days | |
| 3. | Władysław Seyda | | 22 September 1924 – 17 January 1929 | | 4 years, 117 days | |
| 4. | Leon Supiński | | 17 January 1929 – 1 September 1939 | | 10 years, 227 days | |
Polish People's Republic
| 5. | Wacław Barcikowski | | 26 January 1945 – 12 November 1956 | | 11 years, 291 days | |
| 6. | Jan Wasilkowski | | 12 December 1956 – 22 May 1967 | | 10 years, 161 days | |
| 7. | Zbigniew Resich | | 3 May 1967 – 21 January 1972 | | 4 years, 263 days | |
| 8. | Jerzy Bafia | | 21 January 1972 – 1 April 1976 | | 4 years, 71 days | |
| 9. | Włodzimierz Berutowicz | | 1 April 1976 – 14 May 1987 | | 11 years, 43 days | |
| 10. | Adam Łopatka | | 14 May 1987 – 30 June 1990 | | 3 years, 47 days | |
Republic of Poland
| No | Name | | In office | President of Poland | Term length | Notes |
| 11. | Adam Strzembosz | | 1 July 1990 – 17 October 1998 | Wojciech Jaruzelski | 8 years, 108 days | |
| 12. | Lech Gardocki | | 17 October 1998 – 18 October 2010 | Aleksander Kwaśniewski | 12 years, 1 day | |
| 13. | Stanisław Dąbrowski | | 19 October 2010 – 9 January 2014 (died in office) | Bronisław Komorowski | 3 years, 82 days | |
| – | Lech Paprzycki | | 9 January 2014 – 30 April 2014 | Bronisław Komorowski | 111 days | acting |
| 14. | Małgorzata Gersdorf (Note: Małgorzata Gersdorf and 26 of the 72 judges were forced out by mandatory retirement (set at 65 years old) starting on 4 July 2018. Józef Iwulski and Dariusz Zawistowski both insisted that Gersdorf remain in office, while the issue was brought before the European Court of Justice. Finally a Law reinstating the judges was signed on 17 December 2018, and Gersdorf fulfilled the remainder of her 6-year-term.) | | 30 April 2014 – 30 April 2020 | Bronisław Komorowski | 6 years, 0 days | |
| – | Józef Iwulski | | 4 July 2018 – 20 July 2018 | Andrzej Duda | 16 days | (disputed) rejected appointment |
| – | Dariusz Zawistowski | | 13 September – 31 December 2018 | Andrzej Duda | 109 days | (disputed) rejected appointment |
| – | Kamil Zaradkiewicz | | 1 May 2020 – 15 May 2020 | Andrzej Duda | 14 days | (disputed) resigned |
| – | Aleksander Stępkowski | | 15 May 2020 – 25 May 2020 | Andrzej Duda | 10 days | (disputed) |
| 15. | Małgorzata Manowska | | 25 May 2020 – 26 May 2026 | Andrzej Duda | 6 years, 172 days | (disputed) |
| 16. | Zbigniew Kapiński | | 27 May 2026 - | Karol Nawrocki | | |

== Location ==
From 1917 to 1939, the Supreme Court met in the Krasiński Palace, which had already housed the Court of Cassation of the Principality of Warsaw before 1812. From 1945 to 1950 the Supreme Court met in Łódź due to the destruction of Warsaw in the Second World War. From 1950 to 1999 it met in the building now used by the Warsaw Higher Regional Court. Since 1999, the Supreme Court has had its seat on Krasiński Square, diagonally opposite the Krasiński Palace, which is known for its 86 Latin inscriptions.

== Budget ==
The budget of the Supreme Court is set in the annual budget of Poland. In 2019, expenditure amounted to approximately PLN 160 million and revenue to PLN 0.26 million.

== See also ==
- Constitutional Tribunal of the Republic of Poland

== Literature ==
- L. Garlicki, Z. Resich, M. Rybicki, S. Włodyka: Sąd Najwyższy w PRL. 1983.
- M. Pietrzak: Sąd Najwyższy w II Rzeczypospolitej. Czasopismo Prawno-Historyczne, 1981.
- A. Rzepliński: Sądownictwo w PRL. Polonia Book, London 1990.
- S. Włodyka: Ustrój organów ochrony prawnej, Warsaw 1975.
