= Hanna Świda-Ziemba =

Polish sociologist

Hanna Maria Świda-Ziemba (September 19, 1930 – January 11, 2012) was a Polish sociologist, scholar and opposition activist in the Polish People's Republic.

== Biography ==
Her father was professor Witold Świda, and her sister was professor Zofia Świda. She grew up in Vilnius and started keeping a diary from the age of ten, describing life in Soviet-occupied Vilnius, and documenting the post-war period of creating a new socio-political reality in Poland. She became interested in the mechanisms of totalitarian states and would later expand on her observations in her academic studies.

In 1952 she graduated with a degree in sociology from the University of Łódź, in 1960 she obtained a doctoral degree, and in 1969 her habilitation. She began working the University of Warsaw in 1954. She was a member of the presidium of the Polish Academy of Sciences and also lectured at the SWPS University of Social Sciences and Humanities. She has published a number of academic papers, mainly in the field of sociology on the topic of totalitarian systems. She was co-founder of the Institute of Applied Social Sciences as well as the Institute of Social Prevention and Rehabilitation of the University of Warsaw and in the years 1991-1993 she was member of the State Tribunal.

In 2010 she published Youth of the People's Republic of Poland: portraits of generations in historical context, a culmination of many years of research for which she received the Jan Długosz award in 2011. President Bronisław Komorowski awarded Świda-Ziemba the Commander's Cross of the Order of Polonia Restituta for outstanding achievements in research and teaching.

She died on January 11, 2012, in Warsaw and was buried at the Powązki Military Cemetery (section D 31-tuje-6).

== Publications ==
- Człowiek wewnętrznie zniewolony. Mechanizmy i konsekwencje minionej formacji – analiza psychologiczna, Warszawa 1997
- Młodzi w nowym świecie, Kraków 2005
- Młodzież licealna: analiza wybranych klas warszawskich w latach 1956–58, Warszawa 1963
- Obraz świata i bycia w świecie. Z badań młodzieży licealnej, Warszawa 2000
- Osobowość jako problem pedagogiki, Wrocław 1970
- Stalinizm i społeczeństwo polskie, Warszawa 1991
- Urwany lot. Pokolenie inteligenckiej młodzieży powojennej w świetle listów i pamiętników z lat 1945–1948, Kraków 2003
- Wartości egzystencjalne młodzieży lat dziewięćdziesiątych, Warszawa 1995
- Młodzież PRL. Portrety pokoleń w kontekście historii, Kraków 2010
