= Jerzy Topolski =

Polish historian (1928–1998)

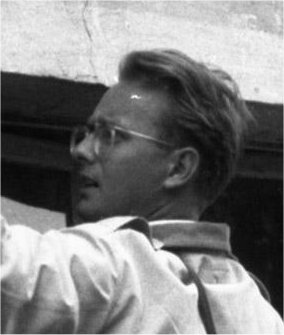
- Jerzy Topolski
- Born: 20 September 1928; Poznań, Poland
- Died: 21 December 1998 (aged 70); Poznań, Poland
- Resting place: Miłostowo Cemetery, Poznań
- Education: Adam Mickiewicz University in Poznań
- Spouses: Zofia Kulejewska (m. 1954; div. 1958) Maria Barbara Antczak (m. 1961; div. 1978) Maria Danuta Łabędzka (m. 1978–1998)
- Children: Anna, Tomasz
- Scientific career
- Thesis: Rozwój latyfundium arcybiskupstwa gnieźnieńskiego (1951)
- Doctoral advisors: Jan Rutkowski, Stanisław Hoszowski

Jerzy Topolski (20 September 1928 – 21 December 1998) was a Polish historian specializing in economic history, history of material culture, the early modern period, and theory and methodology of history. Member of Polish Academy of Sciences, professor of Adam Mickiewicz University in Poznań, he wrote over 1.100 articles and about 30 books.

== Publications ==
- Rozwój latyfundium arcybiskupstwa gnieźnieńskiego od XV do XVIII w., 1955
- Położenie i walka klasowa chłopów w XVIII w. w dobrach arcybiskupstwa gnieźnieńskiego, 1956
- O wyjaśnianiu przyczynowym historii, 1957
- Gospodarstwa wiejskie w dobrach arcybiskupa gnieźnieńskiego od XVI do XVIII w., 1958
- Historia Polski od czasów najdawniejszych do 1990, 1992

== Gallery ==
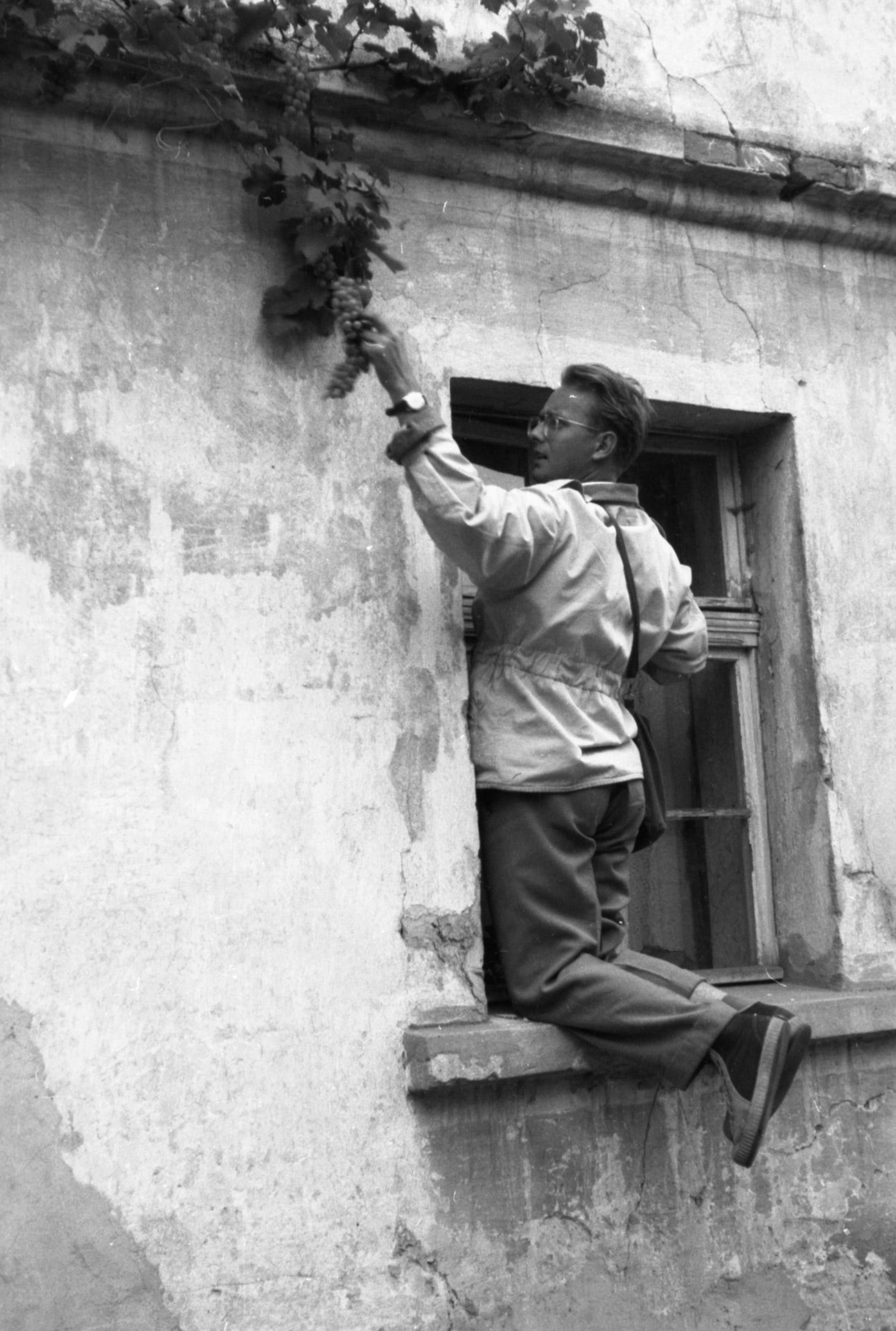
Jerzy Topolski in 1959

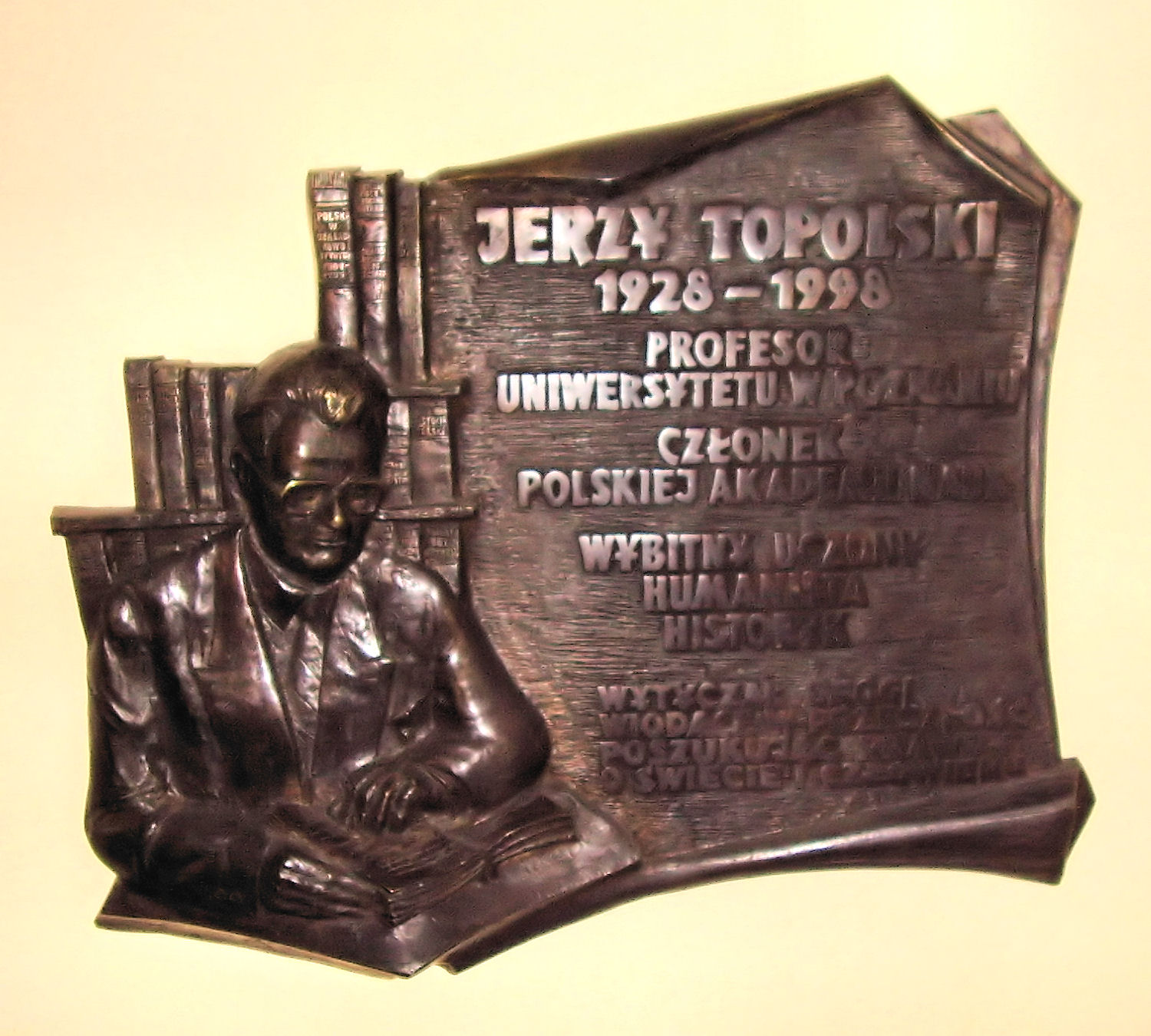
Topolski's commemorative plaque

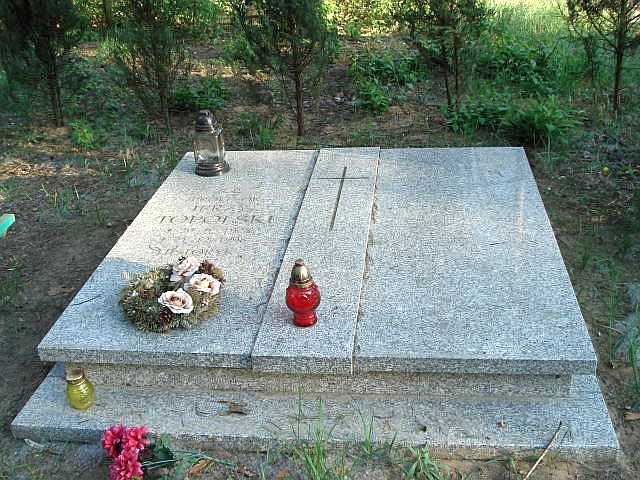
Grave of Jerzy Topolski
