= Piotr Chojnacki =

Polish politician (1945–2026)

Member of the Sejm
- In office 19 September 1993 – 20 October 1997

Member of the Senate of Poland
- In office 26 November 1991 – 31 May 1993

Personal details
- Born: Piotr Antoni Chojnacki; 9 June 1945
- Died: January 2026 (aged 80)
- Party: PSL
- Education: Adam Mickiewicz University in Poznań
- Occupation: Lawyer

Piotr Antoni Chojnacki (9 June 1945 – January 2026) was a Polish politician. A member of the Polish People's Party, he served in the Senate from 1991 to 1993 and in the Sejm from 1993 to 1997.

Chojnacki died in January 2026, at the age of 80.
