= Adam Strzembosz =

Polish lawyer and jurist (1930–2025)

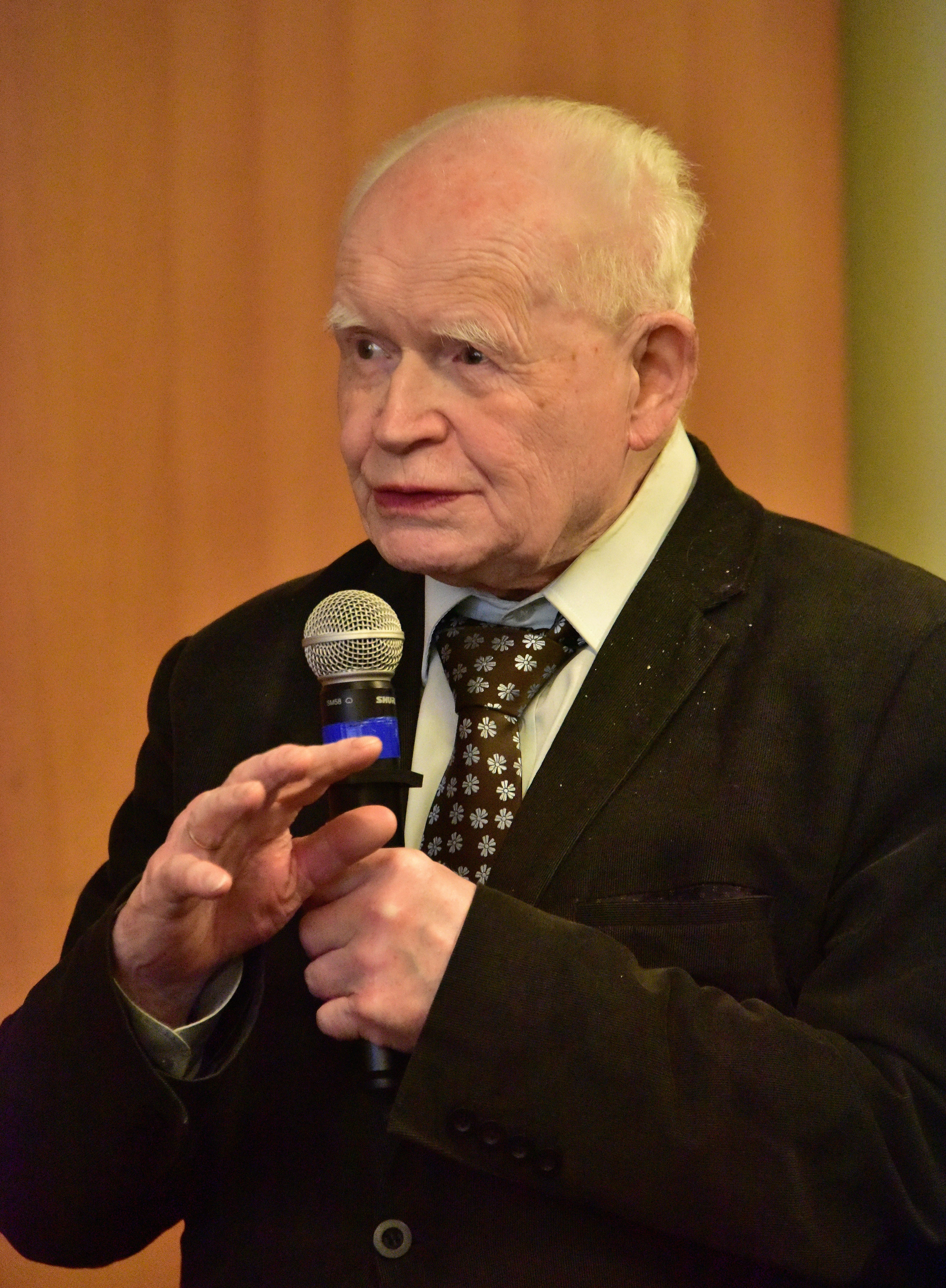
- Strzembosz in 2019
- Born: 11 September 1930; Warsaw, Poland
- Died: 10 October 2025 (aged 95); Warsaw, Poland

Adam Strzembosz (11 September 1930 – 10 October 2025) was a Polish lawyer, judge and the first president of the Supreme Court of Poland in the Third Polish Republic.

== Life and career ==
Strzembosz was born in Warsaw, Poland on 11 September 1930. Between September 1989 and June 1990, he served as Deputy Minister of Justice, and between 1 July 1990 and 17 October 1998 he served in the Supreme Court of Poland. An academic teacher associated mainly with the Catholic University of Lublin. Deputy Minister of Justice in the government of Tadeusz Mazowiecki (1989–1990), First President of the Supreme Court and ex officio Chairman of the State Tribunal (1990–1998), Chairman of the National Council of the Judiciary (1994–1998). Knight of the Order of the White Eagle. Strzembosz died on 10 October 2025, at the age of 95.
