= Secret Teaching Organisation Memorial =

Monument in Warsaw, Poland

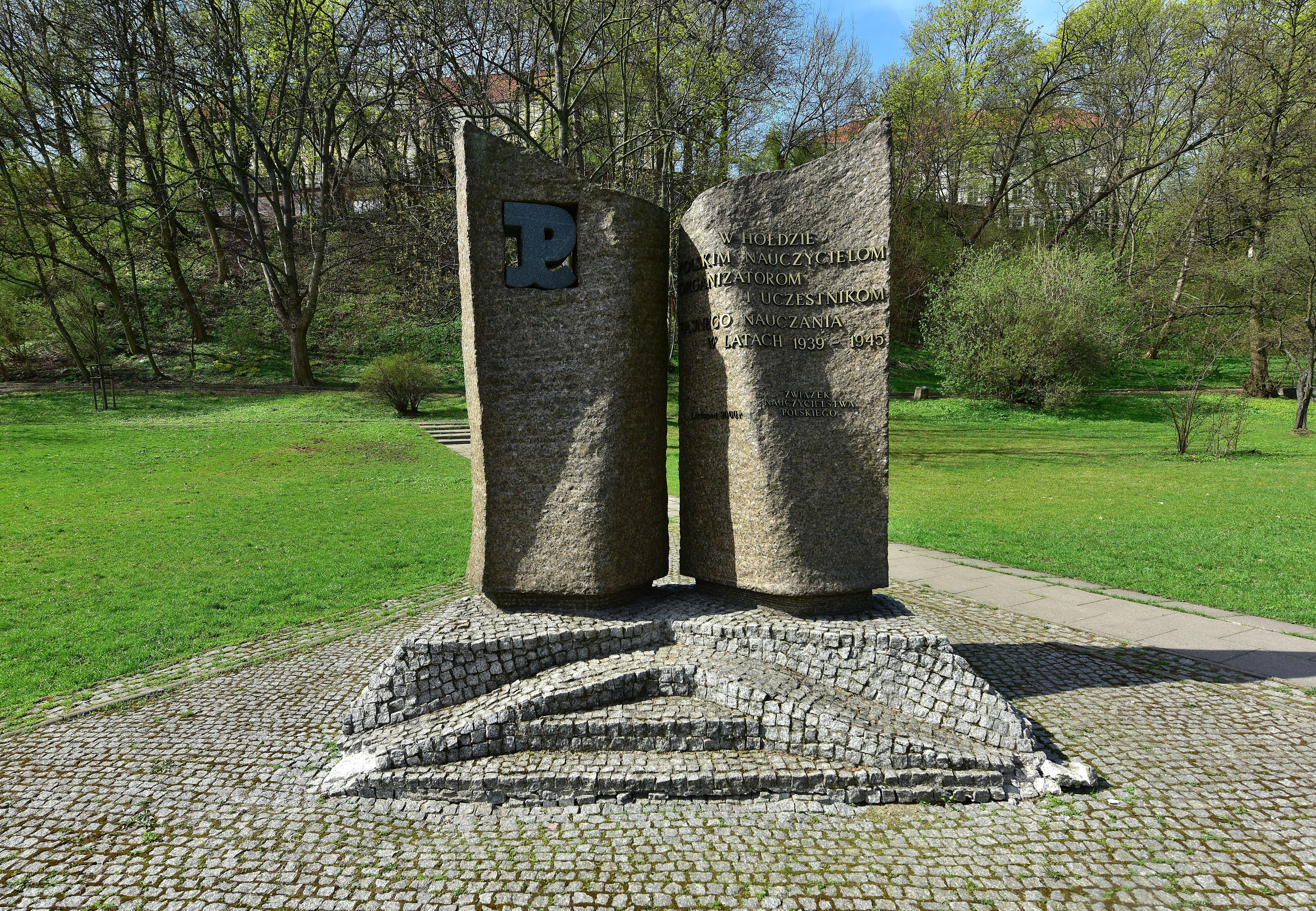
- The monument in 2018.
- Interactive map of Secret Teaching Organisation Memorial
- Location: Browarna Street, Casimir Park, Downtown, Warsaw, Masovian Voivodeship, Poland
- Coordinates: 52°14′28.75″N 21°01′16.69″E
- Designer: Antonina Wysocka-Jonczak
- Type: Sculpture
- Material: Granite (sculpture); stone (pedestal)
- Opening date: 9 November 2000
- Dedicated to: Secret Teaching Organisation

The Secret Teaching Organisation Memorial (Polish: Pomnik Tajnej Organizacji Nauczycielskiej), also known as the Underground Education Teachers Memorial (Polish: Pomnik Nauczycieli Tajnego Nauczania), is a monument in the city of Warsaw in Masovian Voivodeship, Poland. It is located within the neighbourhood of Powiśle in the Downtown district, being placed in the Casimir Park near Browarna Street. It commemorates the teachers, organisers, and students of the Secret Teaching Organisation, which operated in Poland under the German occupation during the Second World War, providing the secondary and tertiary underground education to non-German students, which was illegal at the time. The monument was designed by Antonina Wysocka-Jonczak, and 9 November 2000. It consist of two granite blocks, together shaped to resemble an open book or a school notebook, placed vertically.

== History ==
The monument commemorates the teachers, organisers, and students of the Secret Teaching Organisation, which operated in Poland under the German occupation during the Second World War, providing the secondary and tertiary underground education to non-German students, which was illegal at the time. It was proposed by Jerzy Szczurowski, a son of a teacher of the Secret Teaching Organisation, and financed by the Polish Teachers' Union. The monument was designed by sculptor Antonina Wysocka-Jonczak, and unveiled on 9 November 2000.

== Characteristics ==
The monument is placed within the Casimir Park near Browarna Street. It consists of two tall granite blocks, together shaped to resemble an open book or a school notebook placed vertically. It is placed on a small pedestal, shaped like a small staircase with four steps, lied with small stone pavers. The right side of the monument features a rectangular cutout in the upper right part of the block, with a granite sculpture depicting the Anchor, the emblem of the Polish Underground State and the Home Army during the Second World War, placed in it. It takes a form of a ligature of the captal letters P and W, standing for Polish phrase "Polska Walcząca", which translates to "Fighting Poland". Its placement symbolises the practive in which the specific placement of a flower pot in a window sygnalised the underground teaching was safe to attend. The right side of the monument features Polish inscription, spelled out in the capital letters, which reads:

Polish inscription

W hołdzie
polskim nauczycielom
organizatorom
i uczestnikom
tajnego nauczania
w latach 1939–1945

Związek Nauczycielstwa Polskiego
Listopad 2000

Translation:
English

In honour of
the Polish teachers,
organisers,
and attendents of
the underground education
conducted between 1939 and 1945

The Polish Teachers' Union
November 2000
