= Casimir Park =

Urban park in Warsaw, Poland

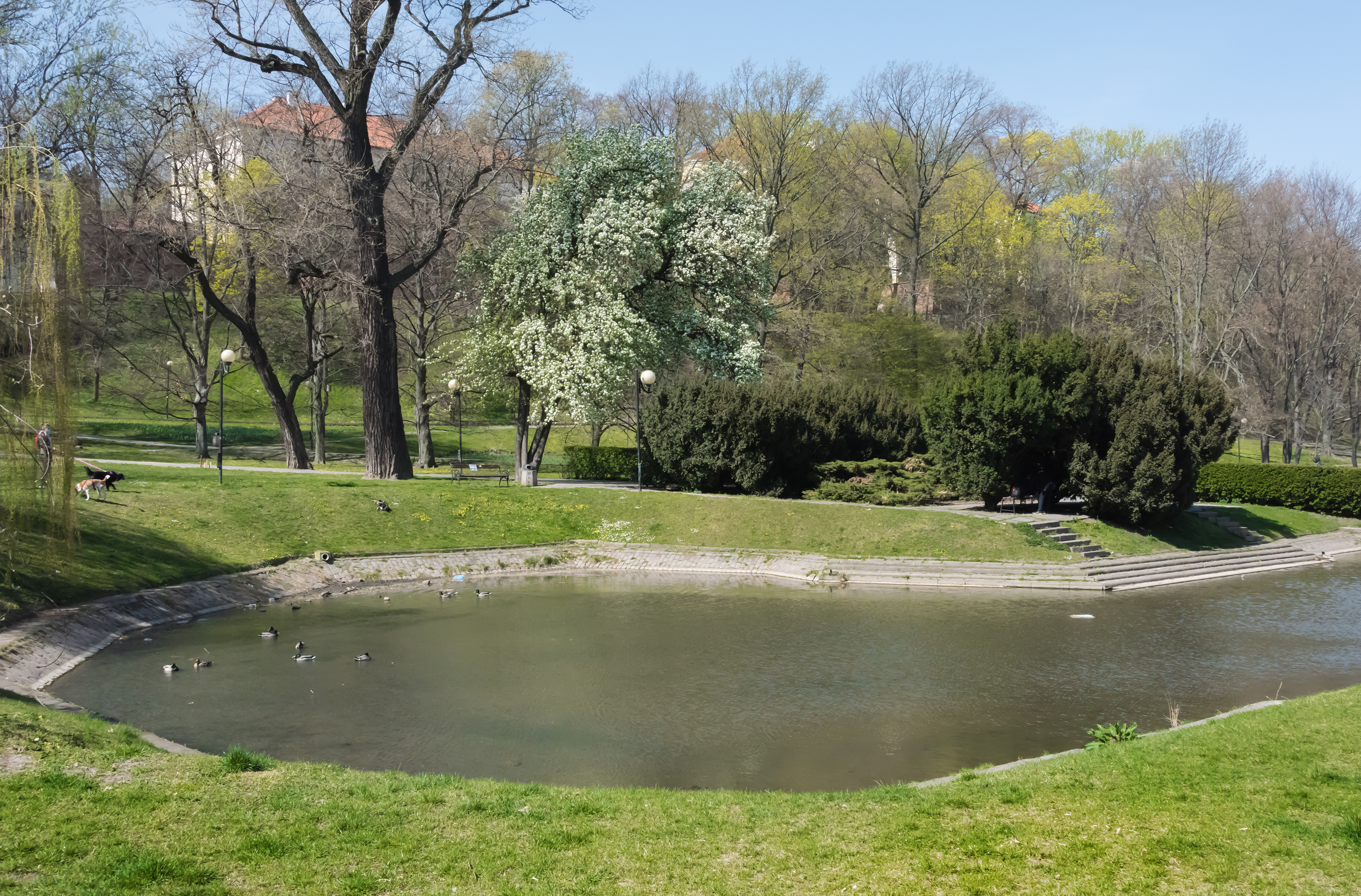
- A pond in the Casimir Park near Browarna Street.
- Interactive map of Casimir Park
- Type: Urban park
- Location: Downtown, Warsaw, Masovian Voivodeship, Poland
- Coordinates: 52°14′29.44″N 21°01′14.52″E
- Area: 4 ha (9.88 acres)
- Created: 1641 (original form); 1960s (current form)

The Casimir Park (Polish: Park Kazimierzowski) in an urban park in the city of Warsaw in Masovian Voivodeship, Poland. It is located in the neighbourhood of Powiśle within the Downtown district. It is placed between Browarna Street, Dynasy Street, Karowa Street, Stanisław Markiewicz Viaduct, and the Warsaw Escarpment with the Casimir Palace.

== Toponymy ==
The Casimir Park (Polish: Park Kazimierzowski) is named after the Casimir Palace (Polish: Pałac Kazimierzowski), which it border to the west. The latter was in turn named after king John II Casimir Vasa (Polish: Jan II Kazimierz Waza), who resided there in the 17th century.

== History ==
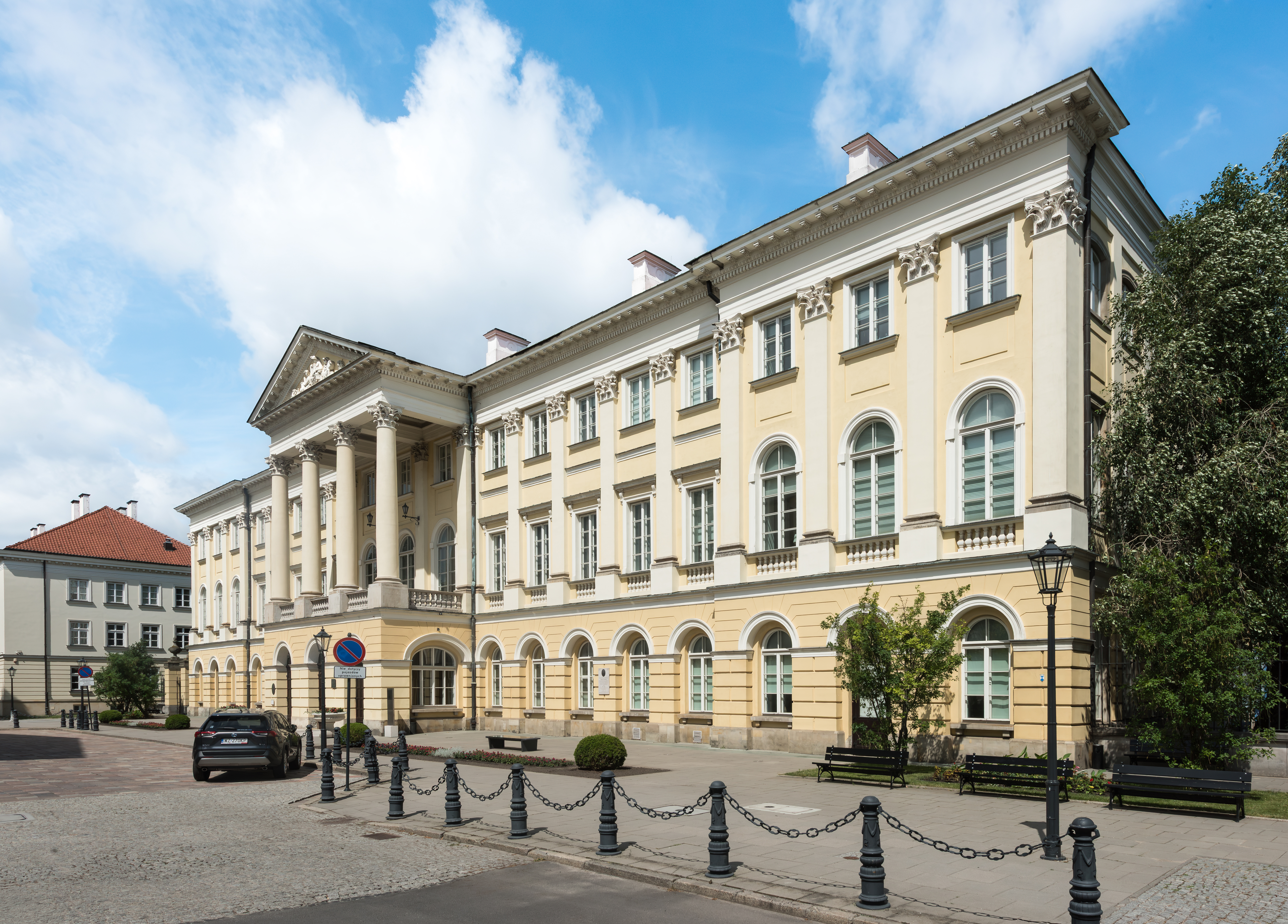
The Casimir Palace, originally built in 1642, with its garden forming the Casimir Park in the 1960s.

Between 1637 and 1642, a Baroque residence, originally known as the Royal Villa, was built for Władysław IV Vasa the king of Poland and the grand duke of Lithuania. It was designed by architect Giovanni Battista Trevano, and constructed in place of the former manor house, farming estate, and an animal pasture of the dukes of Masovia. The palace was built on top of top of the Warsaw Escarpment, with its eastern slopes and area beneath it being developed into a representative garden and an animal husbandry pasture. It was decorated with numerous fountains, sculptures, gazebos, and grottoes. In 1652, the building was inherited by king John II Casimir Vasa, and in 1656 it was destroyed by the Swedish Imperial Army, during the siege of Warsaw in the Second Northern War. It was rebuilt in 1660, in a more simplified form, with the design project by either Isidoro Affaitati or Tito Livio Burattini. It became the favorite residence of king John II Casimir Vasa, after whom it was renamed to the Casimir Palace. Prior to his abdication in 1668, he have given it to his sister, Marie Louise Gonzaga. In 1678, it was bought by king John III Sobieski. The palace burned down in 1695, and was rebuild in 1727, being acquired by king Augustus II the Strong.

Later, in 1735, the palace became the property of count Aleksander Józef Sułkowski, and was acquired by king Stanisław August Poniatowski in 1765, who donated it as the headquarters of the Corps of Cadets, a state-run military school, which operated until 1794. The school used the garden, which land remained undeveloped, for cattle grazing. In 1809, the area next to the palace was redeveloped into a botanical garden of the Warsaw School of Medicine, which in 1816, became part of the then-founded University of Warsaw. The palace became its headsquares, being expanded with two pavilions built in front of it. From 1817 to 1831, it also housed the Warsaw Lyceum, a secondary education school. In 1822, two pavilions were built on both sides of the Casimir Palace, being designed by Michał Kado. In 1824, the palace was rebuilt in accordance to the design by Hilary Szpilowski and Wacław Ritschel.

Until the 18th century, the eastern area of the current park around Oboźna Street formed a wetland which was subsequently drained. In 1837, a structure with a spring fountain, designed by Edward Klopmann, was built in place of a natural water source, on Oboźna Street, next to the Casimir Palace. It was decorated with a sculpture depicting a face of a lion.

The Stanisław Markiewicz Viaduct, built at the western boundary of the park in 1905.

In 1905, the Stanisław Markiewicz Viaduct was built at the northwestern end of the palace garden. Designed in Renaissance Revival style by Stefan Szyller, it formed a part of Karowa Street, connecting it across the escarpment.

The Casimir Palace was heavily damaged in the Second World War during the siege of Warsaw in 1939, and the Warsaw Uprising in 1944. It was rebuilt in 1945 and 1954, in accordance to the project by Piotr Biegański.

Between 1959 and 1966, a housing estate of Radna, consisting of apartment buildings was developed to the south of the garden. During its development, a small pond was created in the garden at the corner of Browarna and Oboźna Streets.

In the 1960s, the palace garden was redeveloped into developed an urban park. In 1984, it was entered onto the voivodeship heritage list.

On 9 November 2000, the Secret Teaching Organisation Memorial was unveiled in the park, near Browarna Street. It commemorates the teachers, organisers, and students of the Secret Teaching Organisation, which operated in Poland under the German occupation during the Second World War, providing the secondary and tertiary underground education to non-German students, which was illegal at the time. The monument was designed by sculptor Antonina Wysocka-Jonczak.

On 1 July 2016, a large board for an outdoor game titled Segment – PRL dla początkujących (lit. 'The Segment, the Polish People's Republic for the beginners'), was unveiled in the park, near Browarna Street. Created by the cultural institution Dom Spotkań z Historią based in Warsaw, the game is themed around the live in the Polish People's Republic and its anti-government dissident movement, with players acting as the game pins walking on a board measuring 100 m^{2} (1076.39 sq ft). Previously, the identical board have been unveiled in 2010 at the Solidarity Square in the city of Gdańsk. Additionally, the same year, several circular benches were also placed in the park, being centered around a large street lamp shaped like a desk lamp, which also serves as a public bookcase.

On 2 August 2020, a monument dedicated to Stanisław Jankowski, code named Agaton, a member of the Polish resistance during the Second World War, and an architect thereafter, who played a prominent role in the post-war reconstruction of Warsaw, was unveiled at the Stanisław Jankowski "Agaton" Square on the corner of Browarna and Karowa Streets, on the boundary with the Casimir Park. It was designed by Antoni Janusz Pastwa.

== Characteristics ==
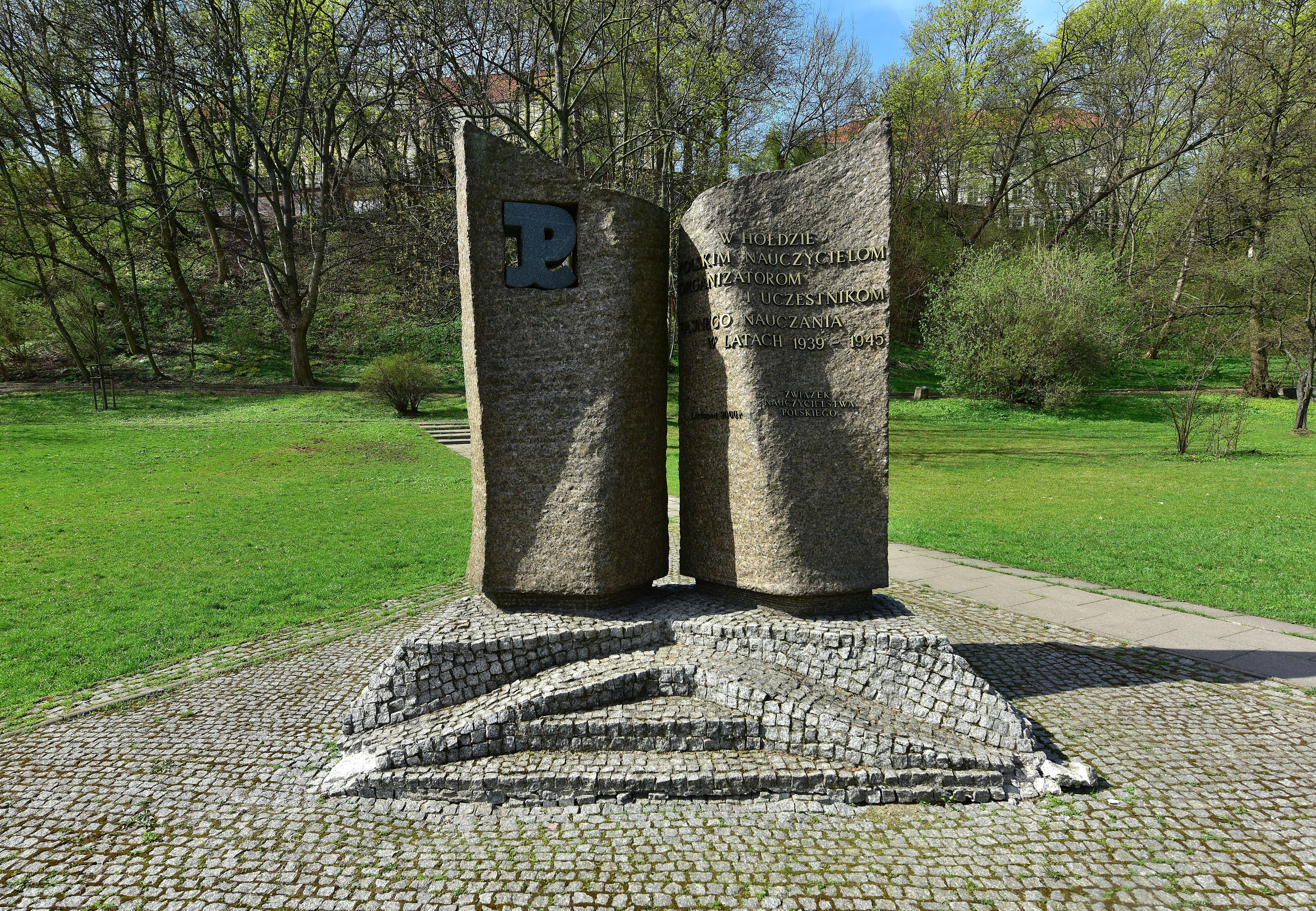
The Secret Teaching Organisation Memorial.

The Casimir Park forms an urban park with an area of over 4 ha (9.88 acres). It is placed on the foothill of the Warsaw Escarpment, which forms its western boundary, featuring the Casimir Palace on the top, a historic Baroque palace dating from 1642, which houses the headquarters of the University of Warsaw. The area features the highest peak of the Warsaw Escarpment, which measures 25 m (82.02 ft) above mean sea level. Its boundaries are also marked by Browarna Street to the east and Oboźna Street to the south. To the north, it borders Karowa Street, a portion of which is formed by the Stanisław Markiewicz Viaduct, a Renaissance Revival crossing from 1905. In the northwest, in the area of the escarpment, the park also borders the Visitationist Church, a historic Baroque Roman Catholic parish church, built between 1728 and 1763. Furthermore, the park also borders the housing estate of Radna, consisting of the apartment buildings, to the southeast.

The tree species in the park include black locust, black poplar, box elder, Caucasian lime, European ash, European beech, European yew, honey locust, horse chestnut, maidenhair tree, Norway maple, northern red oak, northern white-cedar, pedunculate oak, silver poplar, sycamore, white weeping willow, and wych elm. It also features flowering herbaceous perennial species such as Creme Upstar tulip, lesser celandine, Lindheimer's beeblossom, purpletop vervain, and tufted vetch, as well as allheals, buttercups, chrysanths, and knapweeds. A few small natural water springs are present in the park alongside the escaprment slope. One of them, located near Oboźna Street and the Casimir Palace, have been encased in a structure from 1837, as a source of drinking water, decorated with a sculpture of a lion's face. In its southwest corner, at the intersection of Browarna and Oboźna Street, the park features a small artificial pond. It forms one of the rare habitats of European green toad in the city. The park also includes two more small ponds at the foot of the park, which are theorised to have been used to display decorative water plants. The water from them, as well as the water springs, is pumped upwards for the use of the Casimir Palace.

The Secret Teaching Organisation Memorial is placed in the park parallelly to Browarowa Street. It commemorates the teachers, organisers, and students of the Secret Teaching Organisation, which operated in Poland under the German occupation during the Second World War, providing the secondary and tertiary underground education to non-German students, which was illegal at the time. Unveiled in the year 2000, it was designed by Antonina Wysocka-Jonczak, and takes has a shape of an vertical open notebook, being made from granite.

The park also includes a large board for the outdoor game titled Segment – PRL dla początkujących (lit. 'The Segment, the Polish People's Republic for the beginners'), placed near Browarna Street. Created by the cultural institution Dom Spotkań z Historią based in Warsaw, the game is themed around the live in the Polish People's Republic and its anti-government dissident movement, with players acting as the game pins walking on a board measuring 100 m^{2} (1076.39 sq ft). Additionally, the area also includes several circular benches centered around a large street lamp shaped like a desk lamp, which also serves as a public bookcase. Furthermore, one of the park pathways, forming an extension of Gęsia Street, is named in commemoration of Bronisław Bozowski (1908–1987), a 20th-century Roman Catholic presbyter from Warsaw.

To the northeast, the park borders the Stanisław Jankowski "Agaton" Square. The later includes a monument dedicated to its namesake, Stanisław Jankowski, a member of the Polish resistance during the Second World War, and an architect thereafter, who played a prominent role in the post-war reconstruction of Warsaw. It is placed on the corner of Browarna and Karowa Streets, at the boundary with the Casimir Park. Unveiled in 2020, and designed by Antoni Janusz Pastwa, it has a form of a relief depicting Jankowski, sculptured in a granite block. To the northwest, the park also borders the Róg Group of the Home Army Square.

== Gallery ==
The spring fountain with a sculpture of a lion's head from 1837, on Oboźna Street.

The board for the outdoor game Segment – PRL dla początkujących near Browarowa Street.

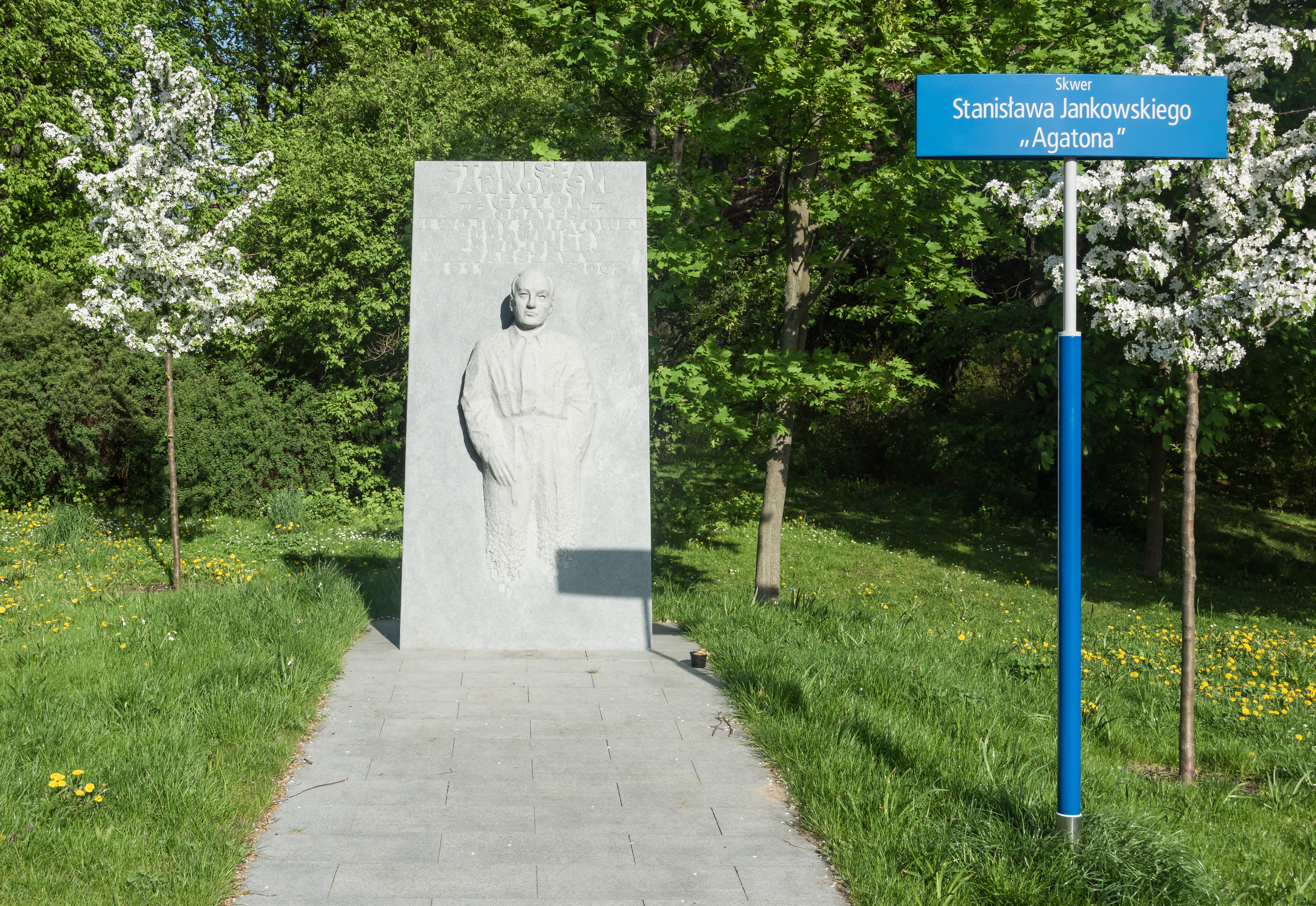
The Stanisław Jankowski "Agaton" Memorial at the corner of Browarowa and Karowa Street.

A street lamp shaped like a desk lamp, which serves as a public bookcase.
