= Krifo scholio =

Purported secret Greek Orthodox schools during Ottoman rule

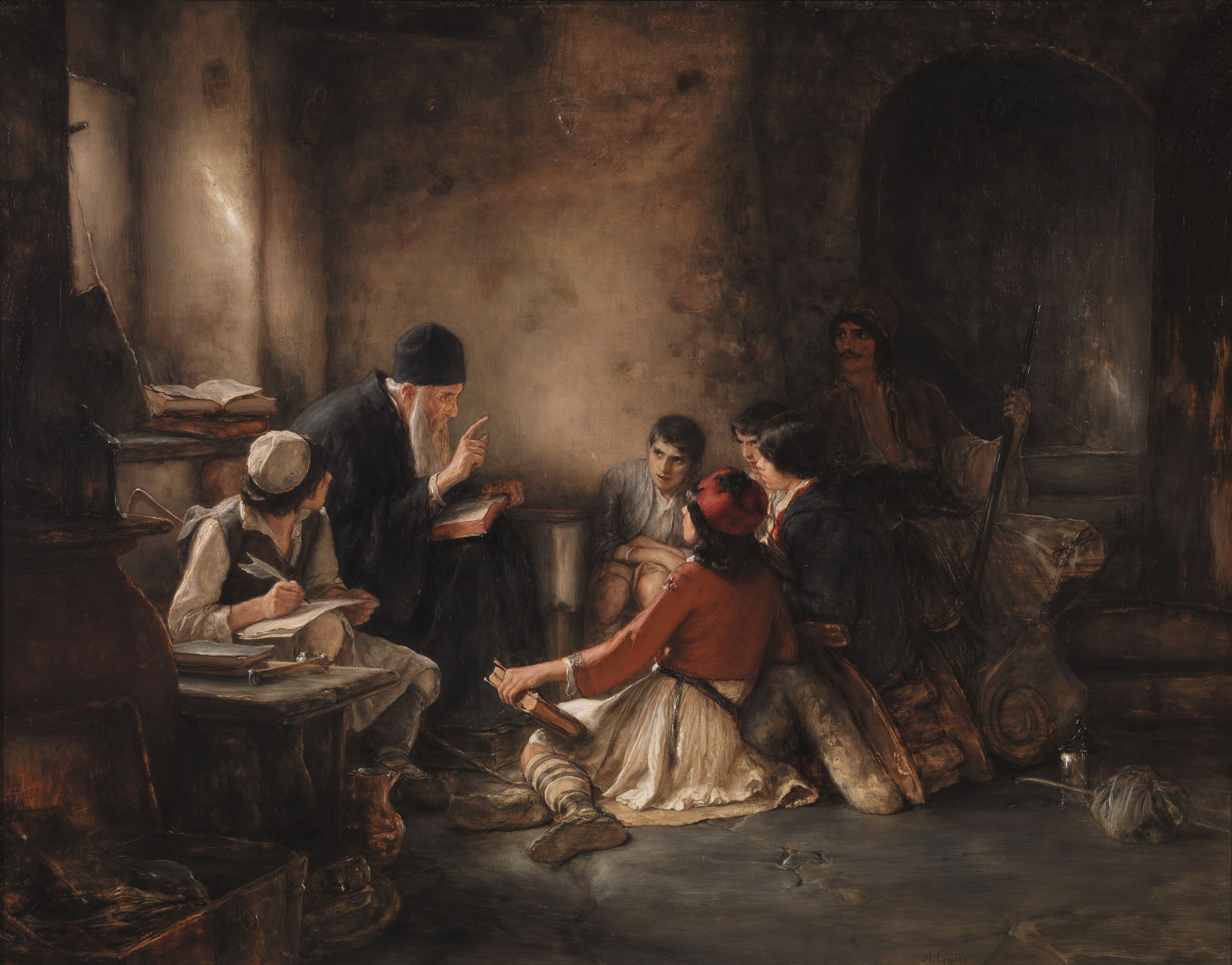
Nikolaos Gyzis, "Greek school in the time of slavery", popularly known as "To krifó scholió", oil painting, 1885/86

In Greek history, a krifó scholió (κρυφό σκολειό or κρυφό σχολείο, lit. 'secret school') was a supposed underground school for teaching the Greek language and Christian doctrine, provided by the Greek Orthodox Church under Ottoman rule in Greece between the 15th and 19th centuries. Many historians agree that there is no evidence that such schools ever existed. Other historians accept that secret schools only existed during periods of intense Islamization, while other see it as a possible "myth" and others believe that the Krifo Scholio was a reality. Professor of philology Alkes Angelou (1917–2001), in one of his last publications on the subject, finds that the krifó scholió persisted as a national myth. Other Greek scholars criticize Angelou's work as politically motivated and biased.

School textbooks in Greece treated the krifó scholió as factual until the late 20th century, when it was finally removed, despite some political controversy, as a "national memory which had been, to some extent, fictitious", creating conflict with "the Church and ethnonationalism".

== Background ==
There is ample evidence that Greek language schools operated in many places of the Ottoman Empire, especially after mid-18th century. However, there are indications that local Ottoman authorities in the periphery were unfavorable toward schools. For example, an 1820 article referring to the formidable school of Melies (Central Greece) describes it as "favorable to a retreat of the Muses [because] It is remote from the jealous eye of the Turkish governor, and still more secured from his encroachments by certain privileges and immunities, which have been granted to the town by the government." There were restrictions; in Ottoman Epirus in 1913, for example, the authorities required that books come from Ottoman Constantinople rather than from Athens in independent Greece, so some teachers gave political instruction in secret.

Nonetheless, it is sometimes said in Greece today that the Ottoman authorities prohibited education in the languages of non-Muslim subject peoples, obliging Greeks to organize small, secret schools in monasteries and churches. Supposed sites of such secret schools are today shown in many places in Greece, notably at the Philosophou Monastery in Dimitsana. These schools are often credited, specially by the Greek Church, with having played a decisive role in keeping Greek language and literacy alive through the period of Turkish rule.

Angelou claims that the first mention of such schools has been traced to 1825, in a work of the German scholar Carl Iken, quoting information given to him by a Greek scholar, Stephanos Kanellos. An earlier mention of repressed education of Greeks is found in a speech of Konstantinos Oikonomou, in 1821. He says that schools in Ottoman Empire operated under the pretext of teaching religion and commerce, some of them were kept open through bribing influential Turks, and that the official school of Smyrna was persecuted because it taught mathematics and philosophy. In 1823, Greek scholar Michel Schinas, in 1823, describes the obstacles imposed to Greek schools by local Ottoman authorities. Due to these hindrances, "pupils and teachers retreated in the darkness to avoid the encounter of denunciation". Apart from the Greeks, also Albanians under Ottoman rule operated secret schools in the late 19th century, organized by Bektashi priests.

Greek author Gritsopoulos has also published works supporting the existence of secret schools, though allowing for the continuation of Greek-language higher education in Constantinople in the early Ottoman Empire.

The narrative of secret school became popular after the Revolution of 1821. It became more popular and more entrenched in the collective memory of Greeks through a painting by Nikolaos Gyzis called "Greek school in the time of slavery", of 1885-86 (today in the Emphietzoglou Collection, Athens). It depicts a romanticized scene of such a school, with the venerable figure of an old orthodox priest reading by candlelight to a group of boys and young men in the traditional attire of Greek klephts.

Equally popular was a poem, of the same title, by Ioannis Polemis (1900). Its first stanza runs:

Απ' έξω μαυροφόρ' απελπισιά,
πικρής σκλαβιάς χειροπιαστό σκοτάδι,
και μέσα στη θολόκτιστη εκκλησιά,
στην εκκλησιά, που παίρνει κάθε βράδυ
την όψη του σχολειού,
το φοβισμένο φως του καντηλιού
τρεμάμενο τα ονείρατα αναδεύει,
και γύρω τα σκλαβόπουλα μαζεύει.

Translation:

Outside, black desperation,
tangible shadow of bitter slavery,
but inside in the vaulted church,
the church which assumes every night
the shape of a school,
there is the shivering light of the candle
lighting up the dreams
and collecting the children of the slaves from all around.

== Krifo scholio as a myth ==
Among scholars who argued against the existence of the "secret schools" as early as the first half of the 20th century, were the historians Dimitrios Kambouroglou, Manuel Gedeon, and Yannis Vlachoyannis.

Within the Ottoman millet system, the Ecumenical Patriarchate of Constantinople was responsible for most aspects of civil administration for the Christian population, and it had a high degree of autonomy in running its own affairs. Hence the church was free to run schools wherever it desired. The existence of many public, legally operated Greek schools is in fact well attested, especially in the larger towns after the 17th century, although the church never went so far as to organize a full-scale school program for the whole of the population.

Outside the scholarly literature, there continues to be considerable support for the existence of these schools.

Another approach accepts that Ottoman administration did not try to forbid Greek or Christian schools, but instead argues that patriotic ideas, national consciousness and modern Greek history were spread through secret lessons given in secret places by teachers propagating the idea of national liberation.
