= Behold the Bridegroom Arriving =

1899 painting by Nikolaos Gyzis

- Ιδού ο Νυμφίος έρχεται (Greek)
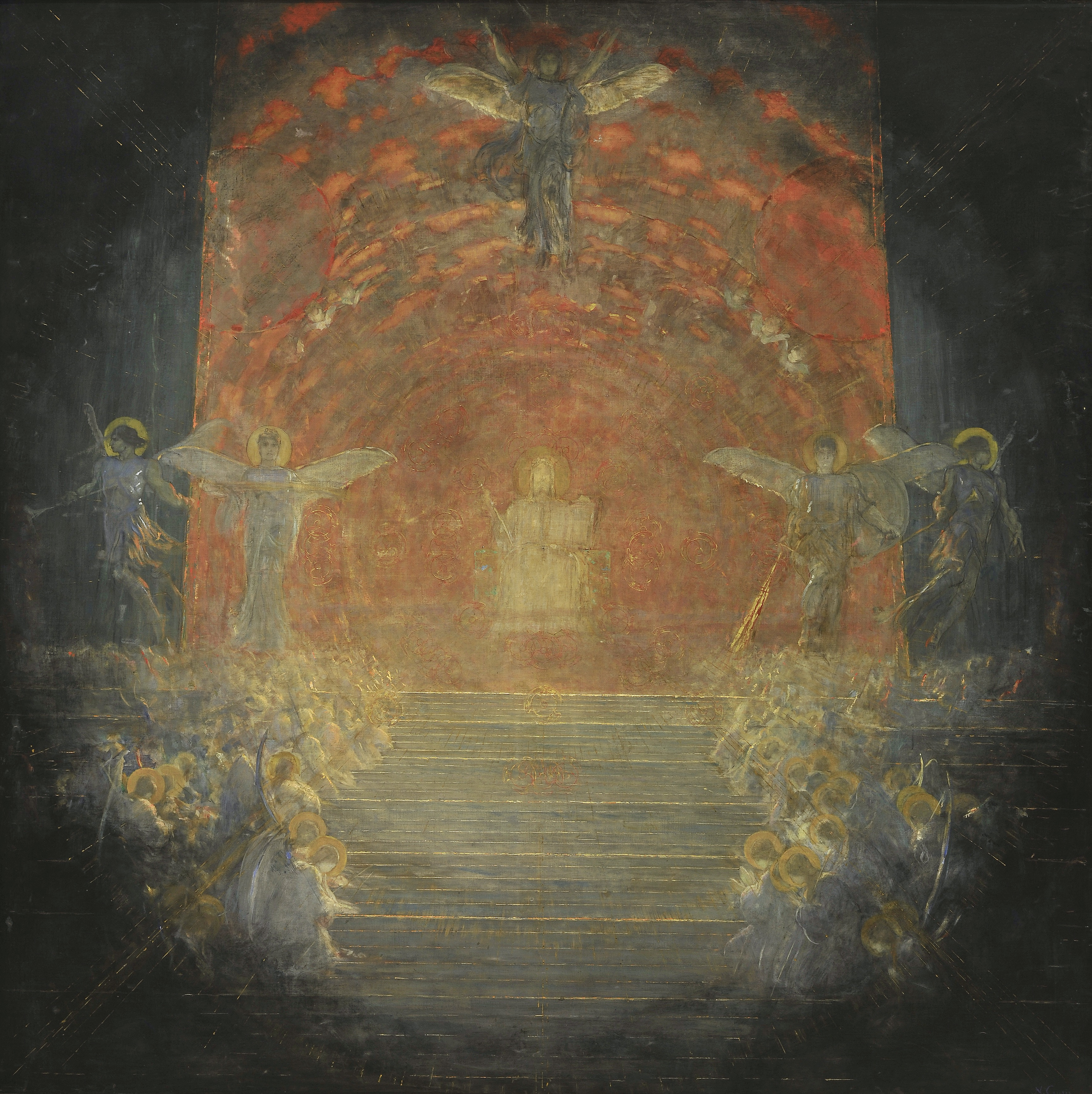
- Artist: Nikolaos Gyzis
- Year: 1899–1900
- Medium: Oil on canvas
- Dimensions: 200 cm × 200 cm (79 in × 79 in)
- Location: National Gallery; Athens

Behold the Bridegroom Arriving is a painting by Nikolaos Gyzis, from 1899–1900.

== Description ==
The painting is an oil on canvas with dimensions of 200 x 200 centimeters. It is in the collection of the National Gallery, in Athens.

== Analysis ==
The scene depicts the second coming of Christ, on a throne, against a purple and gold background.
