= Stanisław Jankowski "Agaton" Memorial =

Sculpture in Warsaw, Poland

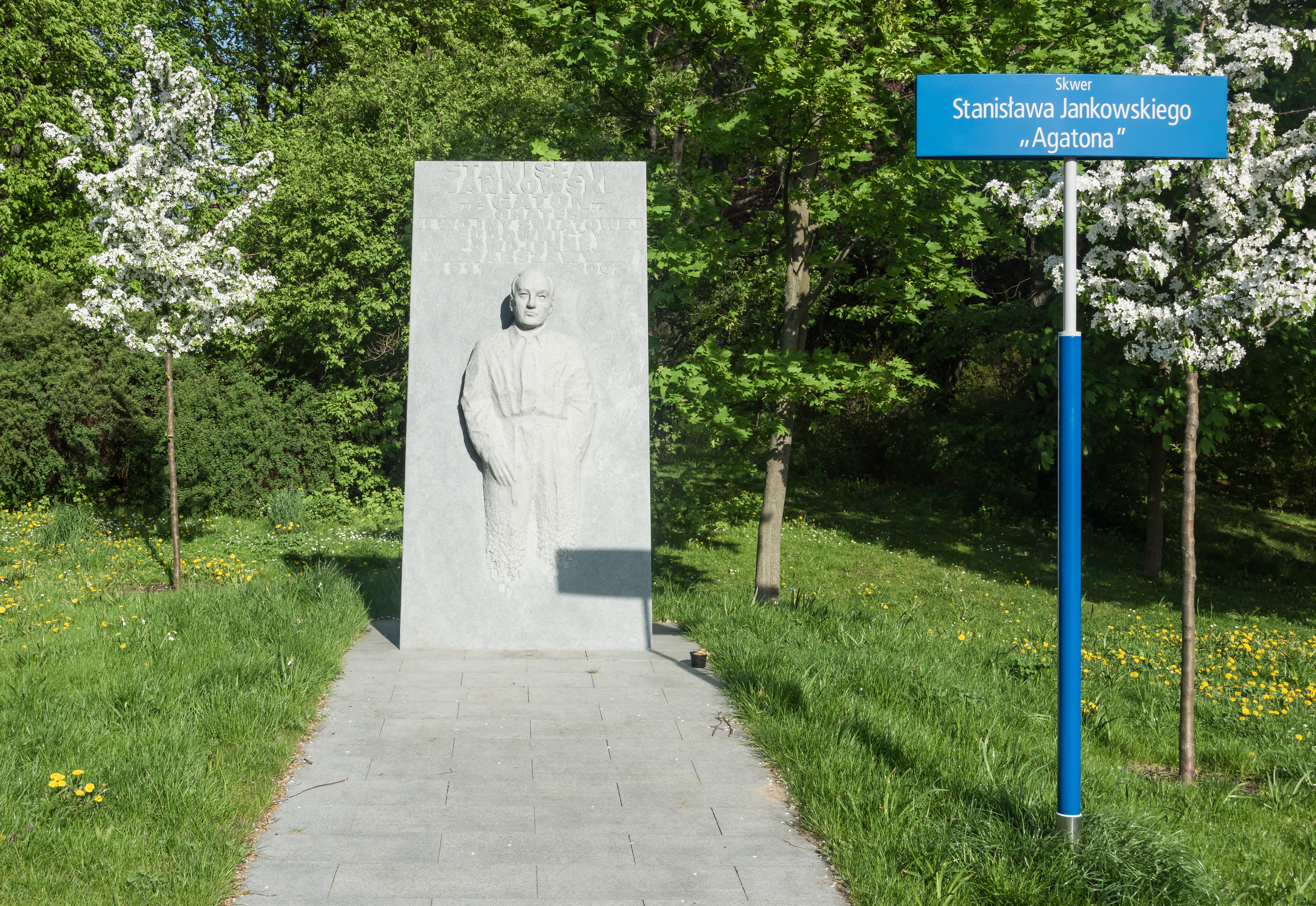
- The monument in 2022.
- Interactive map of Stanisław Jankowski "Agaton" Memorial
- Location: Downtown, Warsaw, Poland
- Coordinates: 52.243571°N 21.020437°E
- Designer: Antoni Janusz Pastwa
- Type: Sculpture
- Material: Granite
- Height: 3 m (9.8 ft)
- Opening date: 2 August 2020
- Dedicated to: Stanisław Jankowski

The Stanisław Jankowski "Agaton" Memorial (Polish: Pomnik Stanisława Jankowskiego „Agatona”) is a sculpture in Warsaw, Poland, at the intersection of Karowa and Browarna Streets, within the neighbourhood of Powiśle, in the Downtown district, next to the Casimir Park. It is dedicated to Stanisław Jankowski, code name: Agaton, a member of the Polish resistance during the Second World War, and an architect thereafter, who played a prominent role in the post-war reconstruction of Warsaw. The sculpture has a form of a relief depicting him in a 3-metre-tall granite block. It was designed by Antoni Janusz Pastwa, and unveiled on 2 August 2020.

== History ==
The monument was proposed by Foundation for the Remembrance of the Heroes of the Warsaw Uprising, and the Warsaw Insurgents Association, and dedicated to Stanisław Jankowski, code name: Agaton, a member of the Polish resistance during the Second World War, and an architect thereafter, who played a prominent role in the post-war reconstruction of Warsaw. It was financed by the Foundation for the Remembrance of the Heroes of the Warsaw Uprising, Warsaw City Council, and companies BBI Development, Dom Development, Marvipol Development, and Robyg. The sculpture was designed by Antoni Janusz Pastwa, while its surroundings were arranged by architecture firm Juvenes Projekt.

It was unveiled on 2 August 2020, at a small garden square named after Jankowski, at the intersection of Karowa and Browarna Streets, next to the Casimir Park. The ceremony was attended by Deputy Marshals of the Sejm Małgorzata Gosiewska and Małgorzata Kidawa-Błońska, Commissioner for Human Rights Adam Bodnar, mayor of Warsaw Rafał Trzaskowski, as well as Jankowki's family and members of the Warsaw Insurgents Association.

== Design ==
The monument has a form a 3-metre-tall light grey granite block, imported from Finland, with a relief depicting Stanisław Jankowski, from times when he worked as an architect. Above it is a Polish inscription which reads "Stanisław Jankowski 'Agaton'; Bohater II wojny światowej; Odbudowniczy powojennej Warszawy; 1911–2002", and translates to "Stanisław Jankowski 'Agaton'; Hero of the Second World War; Rebuildier of post-war Warsaw; 1911–2002".
