= Underground education =

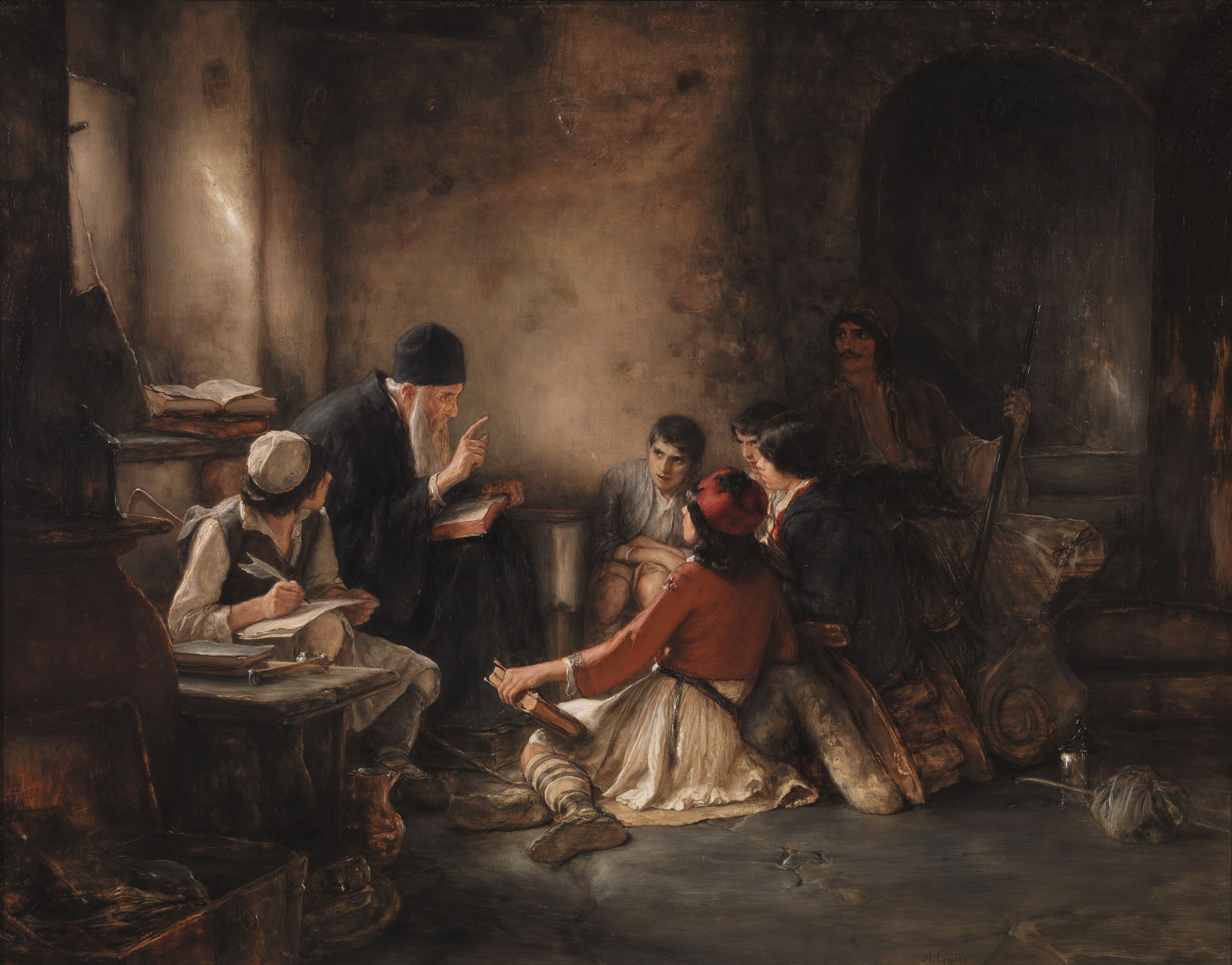
The Greek "Secret School" ("Krifó scholió"). Oil painting by Nikolaos Gyzis, 1885/86.

Underground education or clandestine education refers to various practices of teaching carried out at times and places where such educational activities were deemed illegal.

Examples of places where widespread clandestine education practices took place included education of Blacks during the slave period in the USA and the Secret Teaching Organization in Poland under the Nazis.

== History ==
=== Early modern era ===
There is a Greek - mostly oral - tradition claiming that secret schools (Krifo scholio) operated during the Ottoman period. There is scant written evidence for this and many historians view it as a national myth. Others believe that the Greek secret school is a legend with a core of truth. According to certain sources, secret schools for Albanians operated in late 19th century by Albanian-speaking communities and Bektashi priests or nationalists under Ottoman rule.

During the era of slavery in the United States, the education of enslaved African Americans was discouraged and eventually made illegal in most of the Southern states. In protest, a number of American activists engaged in illegal underground education of slaves.

In the 19th century during the partitions of Poland, various forms of the underground education, promoting teaching in Polish language and about the Polish culture, often repressed by the partitioning powers, sprung up on Polish territories. Most famous of these was the Flying University that operated in Warsaw. Similarly by the break of the 19th and 20th centuries in Lithuania, a clandestine school (slaptoji mokykla) operated in almost every village, because of the Lithuanian press ban (1865–1904) in the Russian Empire.

In Ireland during the 18th and 19th century, "Hedge schools" were illegal schools operated by Catholics and Presbyterians; at the time, only Church of Ireland education was permitted.

Due to antisemitic policies in Nazi Germany, some Jewish parents turned to or were forced to use private and sometimes clandestine means to educate their children in the mid-1930s.

=== World War II ===
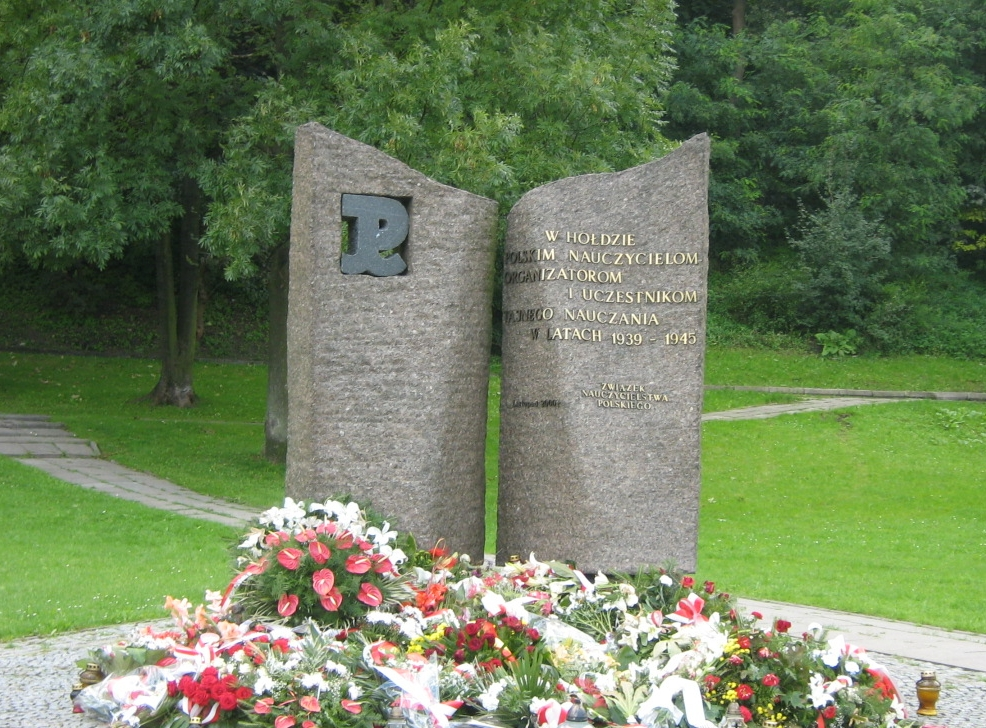
Monument to World War II-era underground teachers, Warsaw, Poland.

World War II saw the cultivation of underground education in Poland (Polish: Tajne szkolnictwo, or tajne komplety). Usually carried out under the aegis of the Polish Underground State, often through the Secret Teaching Organization, prepared scholars and workers for the postwar reconstruction of Poland and countered German and Soviet threats to eradicate Polish culture. Secret schooling was organized in some Jewish Ghettos during the Nazi regime and the German occupation in Europe, in particular in the Warsaw Ghetto.

In the 1930s and 1940s, the authoritarian nationalistic regime of Brazil took anti-immigrant measures, especially against the Japanese. Japanese and other foreign schools, languages, and printed material were restricted and a compulsory assimilation program was instituted. Japanese schools became illegal in 1938. During that period, Japanese immigrants established secret schools and a newspaper in Japanese was printed.

=== Late 20th century-present ===
Underground education took place in a number of Soviet Bloc countries, such as Poland and Czechoslovakia.

During the Taliban rule in various parts of Afghanistan (late 20th, early 21st c.), secret schools operated, mostly for women and girls (ex. Golden Needle Sewing School).

== See also ==
- Jan Hus Educational Foundation
