= Polish Teachers' Union =

Polish trade union for teachers and educators

- Związek Nauczycielstwa Polskiego
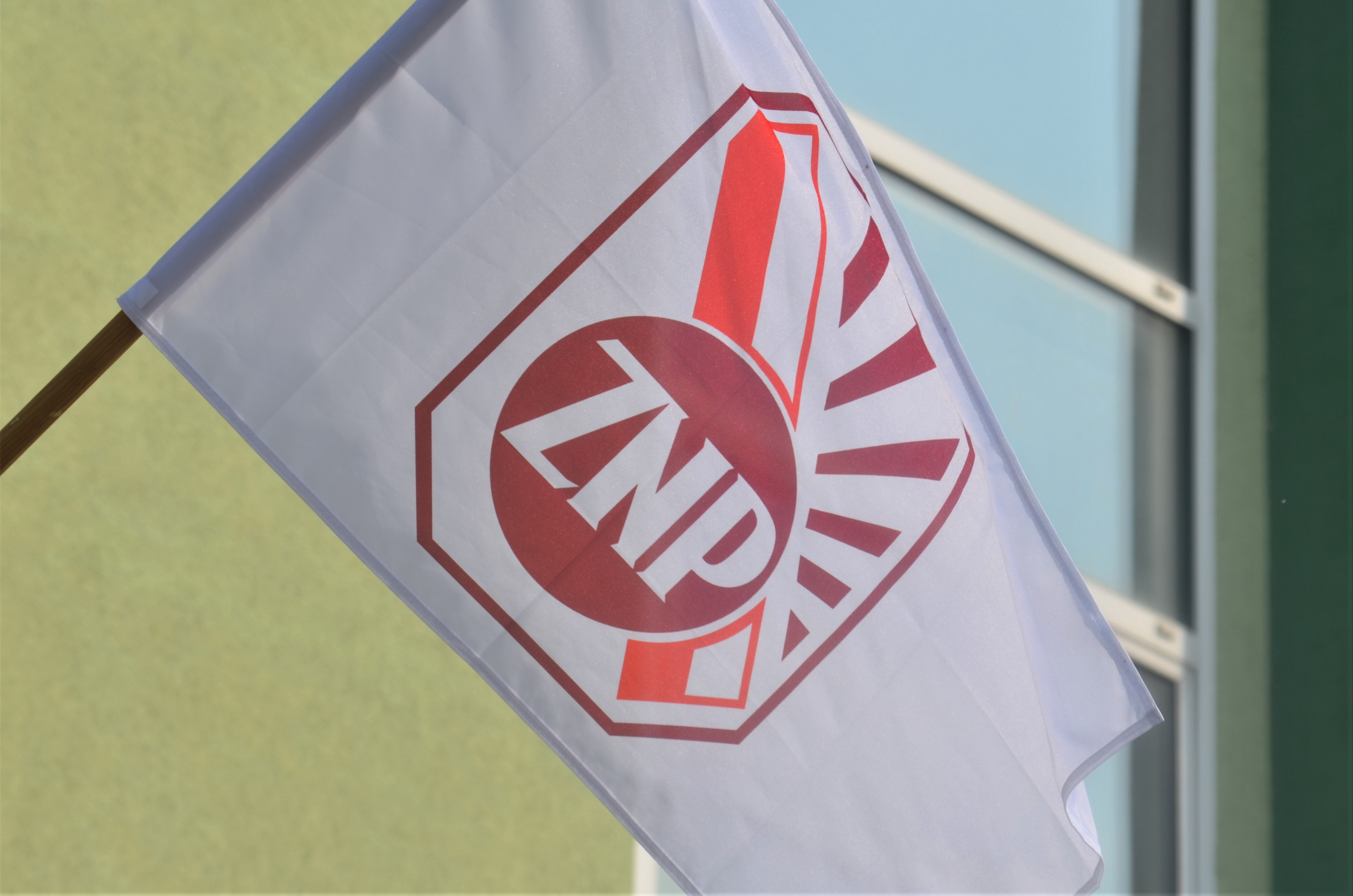
- A flag bearing the ZNP's logo

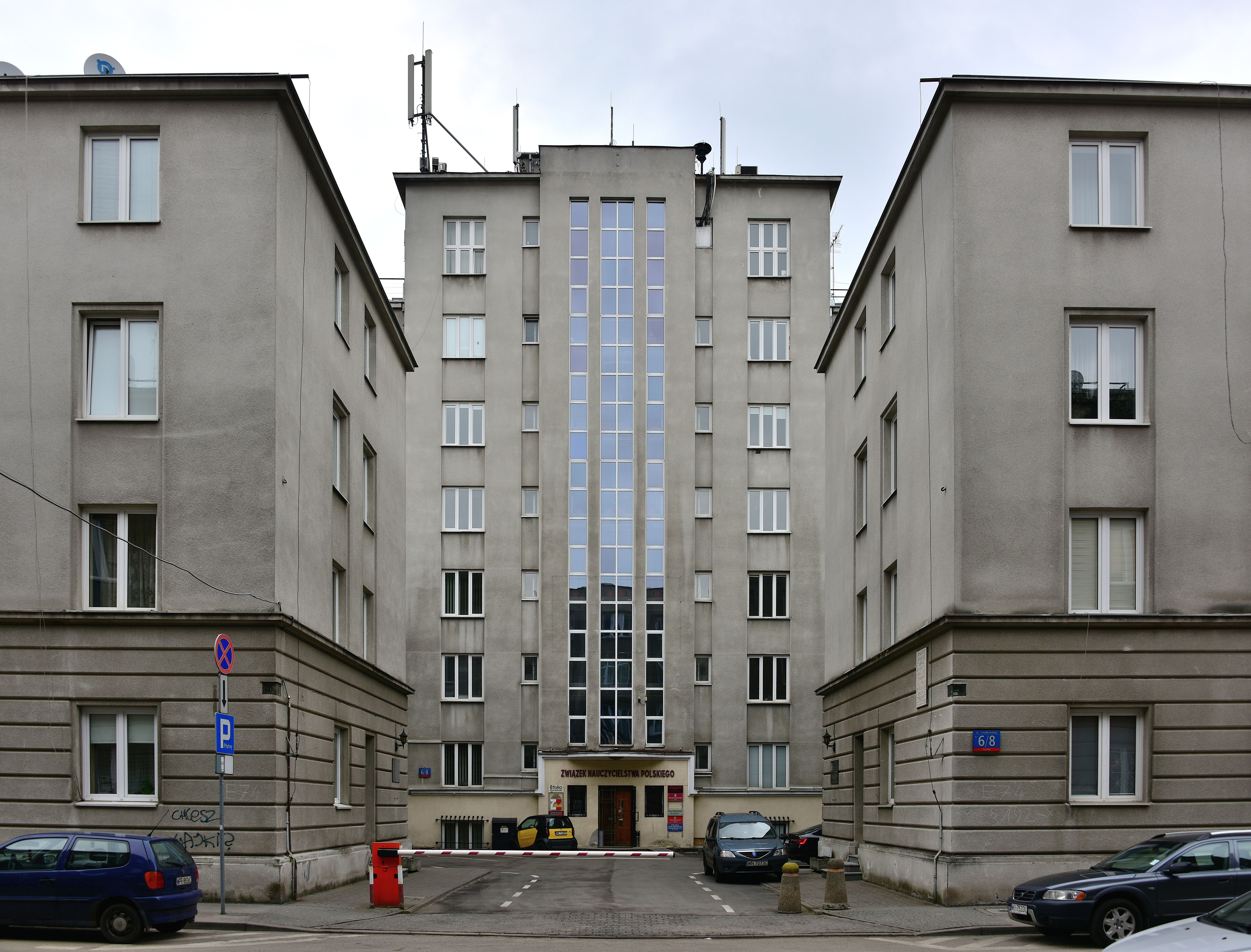
- The ZNP's headquarters in Powiśle, Warsaw
- Abbreviation: ZNP
- Formation: 1930; 96 years ago
- Merger of: Union of Polish Teachers of Elementary Schools; Trade Union of Teachers of Polish High Schools
- Type: Trade union
- Headquarters: Julian Smulikowski Street
- Location: Powiśle, Warsaw, Masovia
- Region served: Poland
- President: Sławomir Broniarz
- Vice-presidents: Urszula Woźniak; Grzegorz Gruchlik; Jadwiga Aleksandra Rezler
- Spokesperson: Magdalena Kaszulanis
- Main organ: National Meeting of the Delegates
- Publication: Głos Nauczycielski; Czytanki o Edukacji
- Affiliations: OPZZ
- Funding: Membership
- Website: znp.edu.pl/o_nas/about-us
- KRS: 0000150507

the Polish Teachers' Union (Polish: Związek Nauczycielstwa Polskiego, ZNP; also translated as Union of Polish Teachers, Polish Teachers' Association, or Association of Polish Teachers) is the largest Polish trade union for teachers and educators and their largest professional association.

== History ==
The first Polish teachers trade unions date to 1905, the year that marks the period of unrest known as the Revolution in the Kingdom of Poland. The ZNP itself was created in 1930 from the merger of the Union of Polish Teachers of Elementary Schools and the Trade Union of Teachers of Polish High Schools, both dating to 1919. In the 1930s, the ZNP, numbering over 50,000 members before World War II, and being the largest Polish association and trade union for educators, became increasingly influenced by socialism, which caused it to be eventually suspended by the conservative and right-leaning Polish government. In response, the socialist wing of ZNP organized the large Polish teachers strike, which succeeded in having the government back down and reinstate the organization. ZNP at that time also maintained auxiliary institutions, such as the Pedagogical Institute, and ran summer vocational courses.

During the war, the ZNP continued to exist as part of the underground education in Poland during World War II, in the form of the Secret Teaching Organization. The Organization was created towards the end of October 1939 in Warsaw response to the Nazi closure of most Polish educational institutions and repressions against teachers.

After the war, the ZNP was reinstated by the Provisional Government, but had relatively little real influence. It was briefly suspended during the martial law in 1981. In 1984 it joined the All-Poland Alliance of Trade Unions. Like most other Polish trade unions, the ZNP became independent after the fall of communism in 1989. The Union leaders decided to keep it aligned to the Polish left (Social Democracy of Poland), which caused a split, as some of the members left for the Solidarity-aligned trade unions. Nonetheless, it remained and is currently the largest Polish trade union for teachers and educators.

== Structure ==
The Union is governed by the National Meeting of the Delegates which convenes every four years. On a day-to-day basis, the Main Office takes care of the routine organizational activities.
