= Emfietzoglou Gallery Museum =

The Emfietzoglou Gallery Museum
- Νέα Πινακοθήκη Συλλογής Εμφιετζόγλου
- Established: 1999 (opened to public)
- Location: Foinikon Str., Anavryta, Marousi, Athens 151 26 (Greece)
- Coordinates: 38.05886364989725°N 23.824190679880157°E
- Type: Art Gallery
- Collection size: ~750 works
- Founder: Prodromos Emfietzoglou
- Public transit access: Athens Metro stations: Marousi station
- Website: No official website

The Emfietzoglou Gallery Museum is an art gallery in Athens, Greece. It is sited in Marousi near the Athens Metro station. Its founder Prodromos Emfietzoglou gave his private art collection of over 500 works to the public.

These days the Emphietsoglou gallery offers a review of 750 works of modern Greek art including some of the best paintings from the last 200 years.

== History ==
Since 19th century Prodromos Emfietzoglou and his family due to their interest in Greek art were collecting works of various Greek painters. Their passion in combination with many artists' donations led in 1999 to the foundation of the museum. Today the collection is composed of paintings, sculpture, photography, engravings and video installations.

== The Gallery ==
The museum is cited in Maroussi in 3.000 m^{2} area next to the collector's residence. Today there are about 750 works of 260 Greek artists. The works are distributed in the museum's building, in the surrounding open area and some are exposed in the collector's residence but in spite of this spatial division visitors are allowed to visit all the works. The last years several educational happenings are arranged. It is calculated that about 20.000 students took part in these happenings.

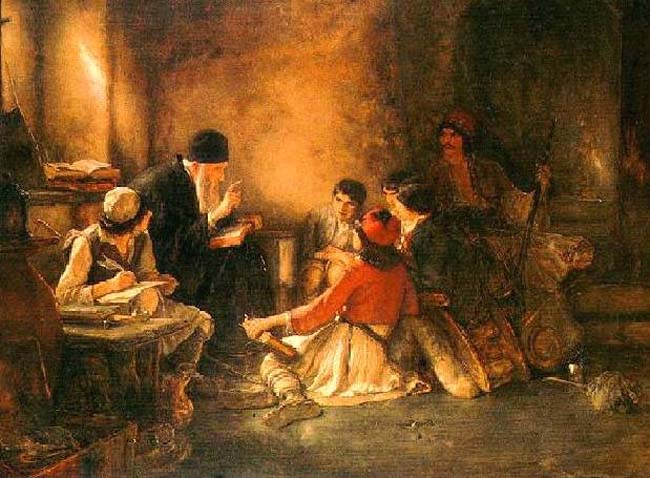
"To kryfó scholió" by Nikolaos Gyzis, 1885/86, Oil painting. (Emfietzoglou collection)

== Collection ==
The collection of the Gallery includes major artworks by notable Greek artists such as:

- Nicholaos Gysis
- Georgios Jakobides
- Nikiphoros Lytras
- Konstantinos Parthenis
- Yiannis Moralis
- Yiannis Gaitis
- Takis
- Vaso Katraki

== Visitor information ==
- Location: Foinikon Str., Anavryta, Maroussi, Athens 151 26, Greece, Athens, Greece
- Tel.: 0030-210-8097100
- Opening hours: Sun 10 am - 6 pm - Educational programms:Teu-Wed 9.45 am, 11.30 am.

== See also ==
- Art in Modern Greece
- Greek art
