= Nikolaos Gyzis =

Greek painter (1842-1901)

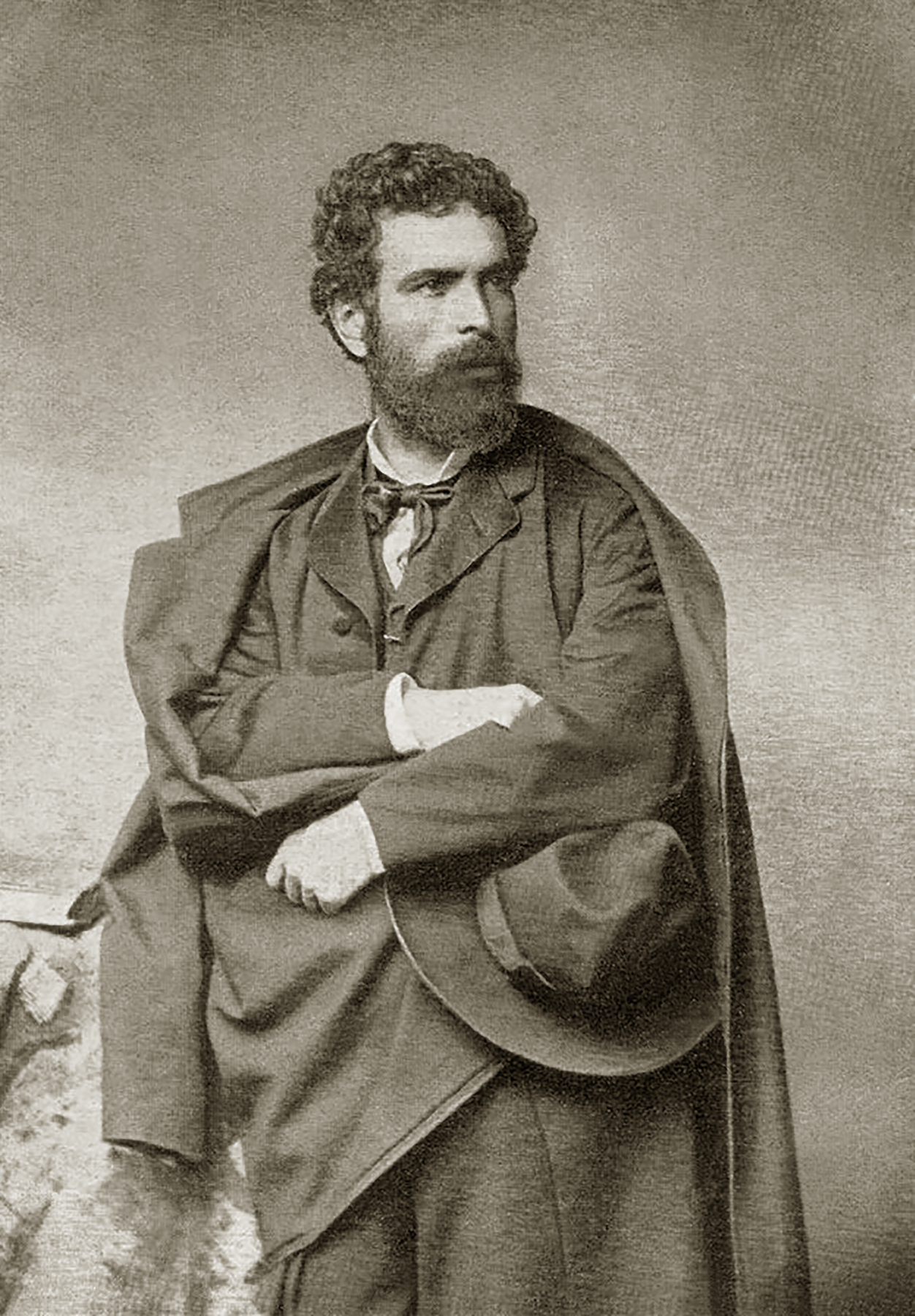
- Born: 1 March 1842; Tinos, Greece
- Died: 4 January 1901 (aged 58); Munich, German Empire
- Education: School of Arts, Athens; Royal Academy of Fine Arts, Munich
- Known for: Painter and faculty member
- Movement: Orientalist; Munich School; Genre art

Nikolaos Gyzis (Greek: Νικόλαος Γύζης [niˈko.la.os ˈʝi.zis]; German: Nikolaus Gysis; 1 March 1842 – 4 January 1901) is considered one of Greece's most important 19th century painters. He was most famous for his work Eros and the Painter, his first genre painting. It was auctioned in May 2006 at Bonhams in London, being last exhibited in Greece in 1928. He was the major representative of the Munich School, the major 19th-century Greek art movement.

== Life ==
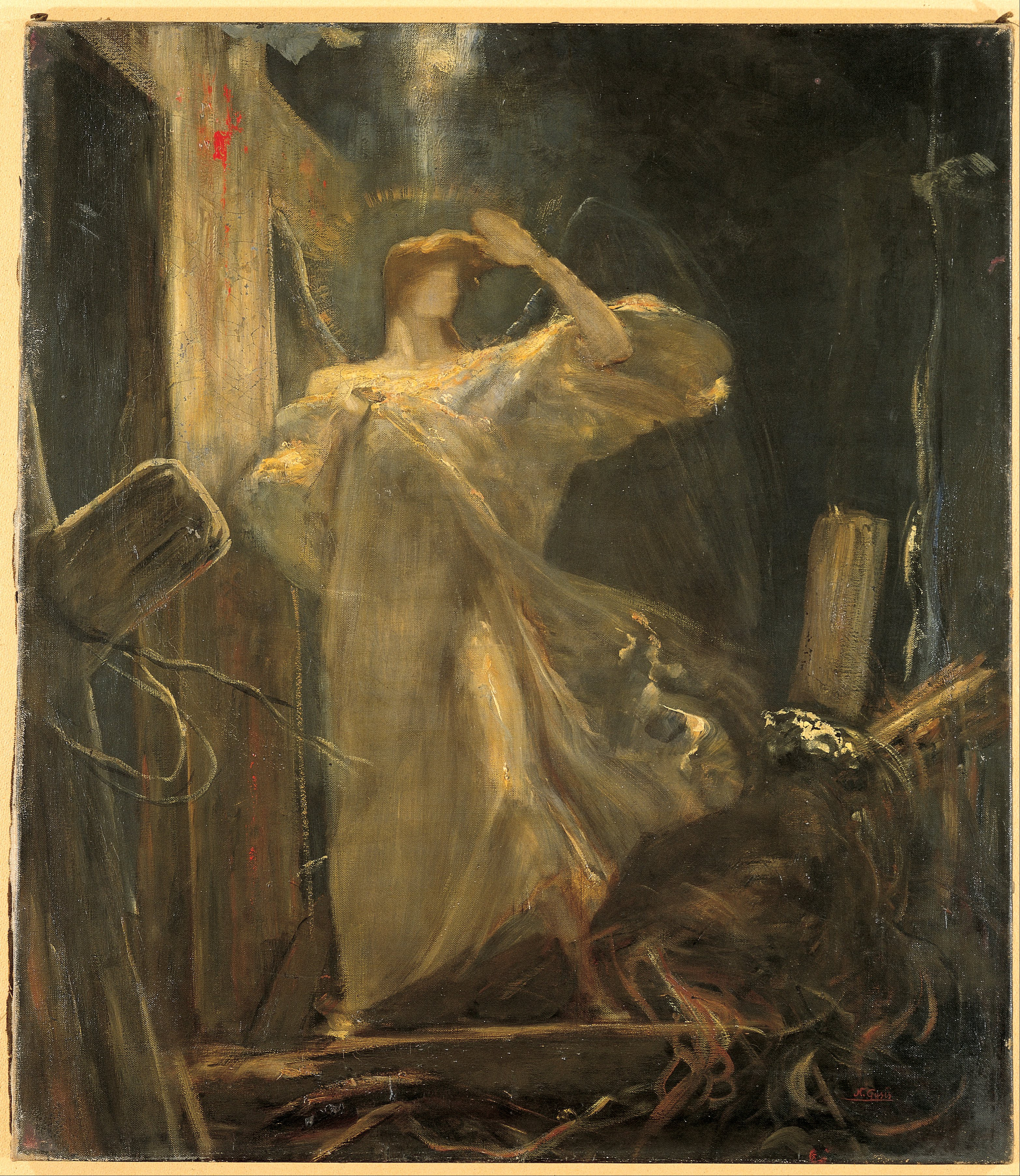
Gyzis Nikolaos, Archangel, study for the Foundation of the Faith

Gyzis was born in the village of Sklavochori, on the island of Tinos which has a long artistic history. As his family settled in Athens in 1850, he soon embarked on a study at the Athens School of Fine Arts. His studies there formed the foundation of his artistic education and helped him to develop his natural skill in painting.

In 1865, having won a scholarship, he went to continue his studies at the Academy of Fine Arts, Munich, where he settled for the rest of his life. He was very soon incorporated into the German pictorial climate, and became one of its most characteristic representatives of the Greek artistic movement of the Munich School. This is expressed in the painting News of Victory of 1871, which deals with the Franco-Prussian War, and the painting Apotheosis i Thriamvos tis Vavarias (Apotheosis or Triumph of Bavaria).

From 1886 onward he was professor at the Academy of Fine Arts, Munich, and gradually turned from the detailed realistic depictions towards compositions of a singularly impressionistic character. His students included Jan Vochoc, Ernst Oppler, Fritz Osswald, Anna May-Rychter, Alfred Juergens and Stefan Popescu (Romanian painter).

At the beginning of the 1870s returned to Greece for a period of several years, after which he produced a sequence paintings with more avowedly Greek themes, such as the Carnival at Athens and the Arravoniasmata (Engagement Ceremony) and a little later the painting After the Destruction of Psara. Towards the end of his life, in the 1890s, he took a turn toward more religious themes, with his best known work of the later period being Triumph of Religion. Gyzis died in Munich.

== Legacy ==
His works are today exhibited at museums and private collections in Greece, Germany, and elsewhere.

Gyzis' painting The Secret School was depicted on the reverse of the Greek 200 drachmas banknote of 1996–2001.

The Athenian neighbourhood Gyzi is named for him.

== Gallery ==
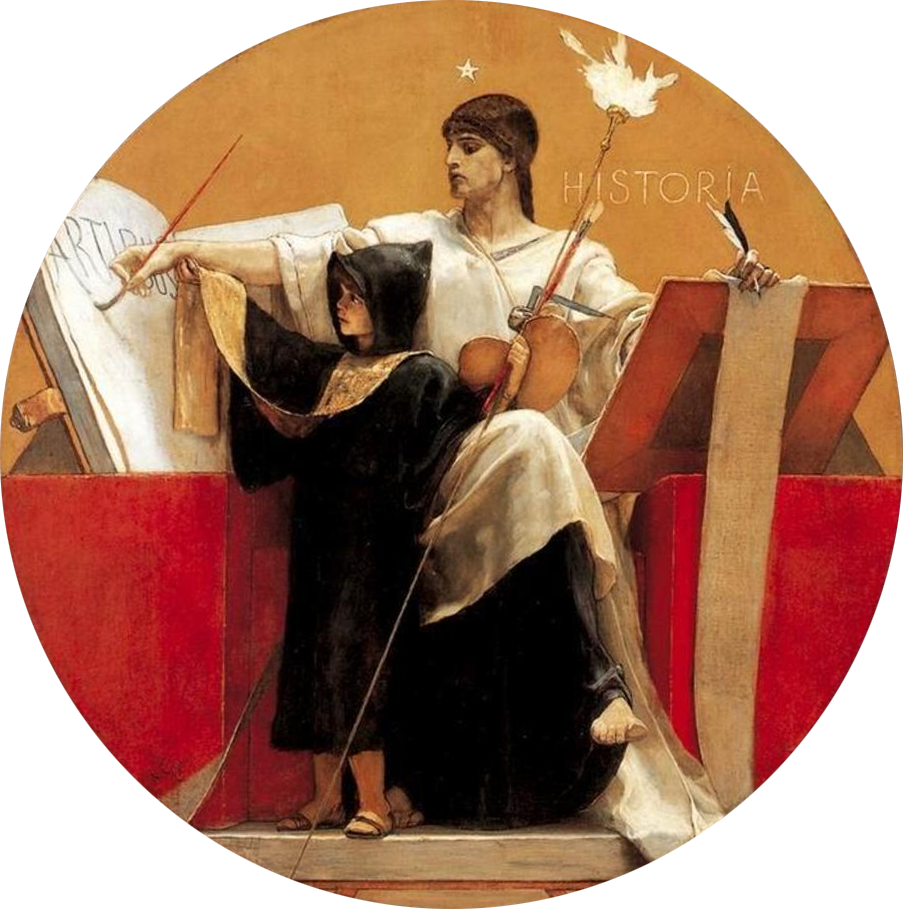
Ηistoria (1892)

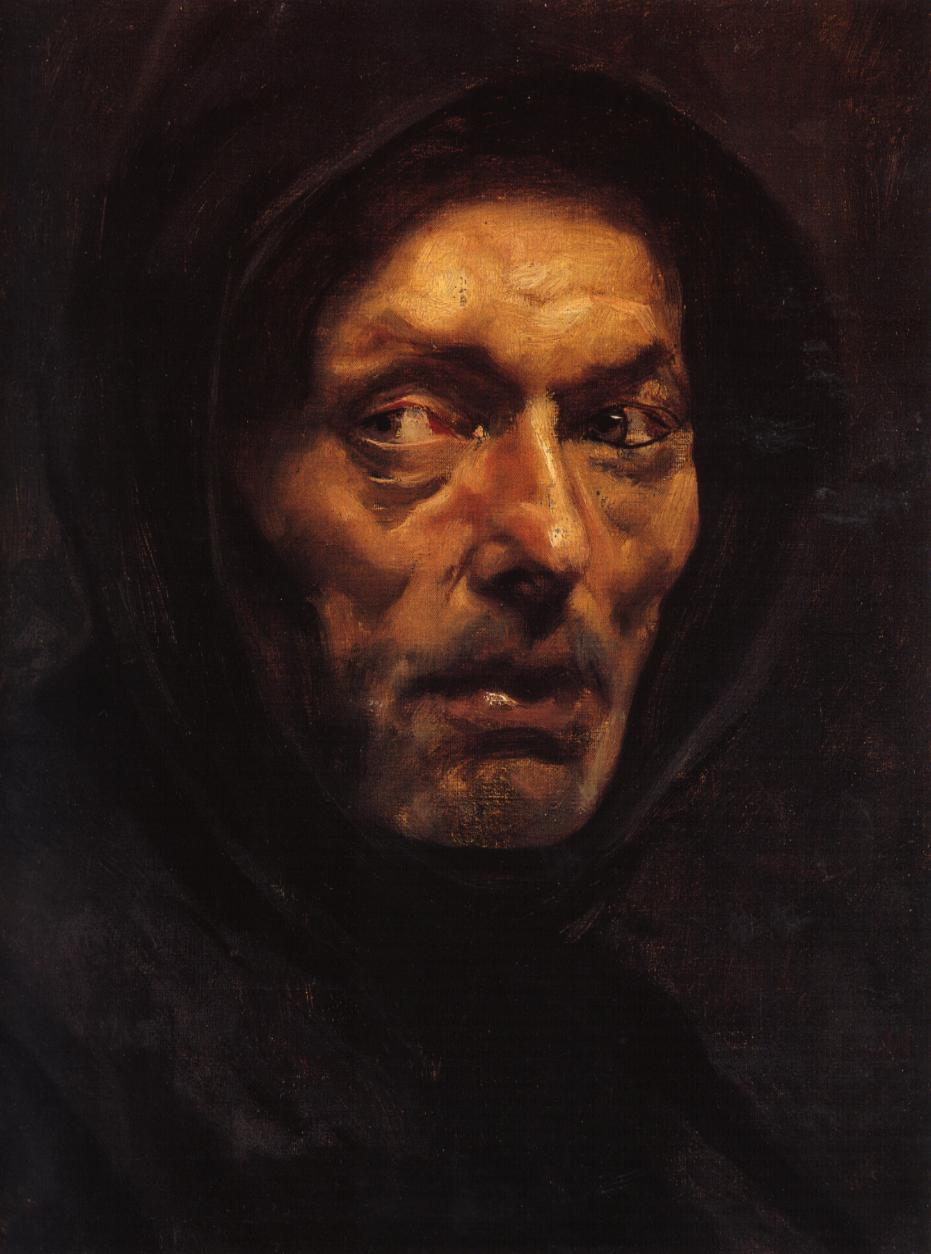
Capuchin friar

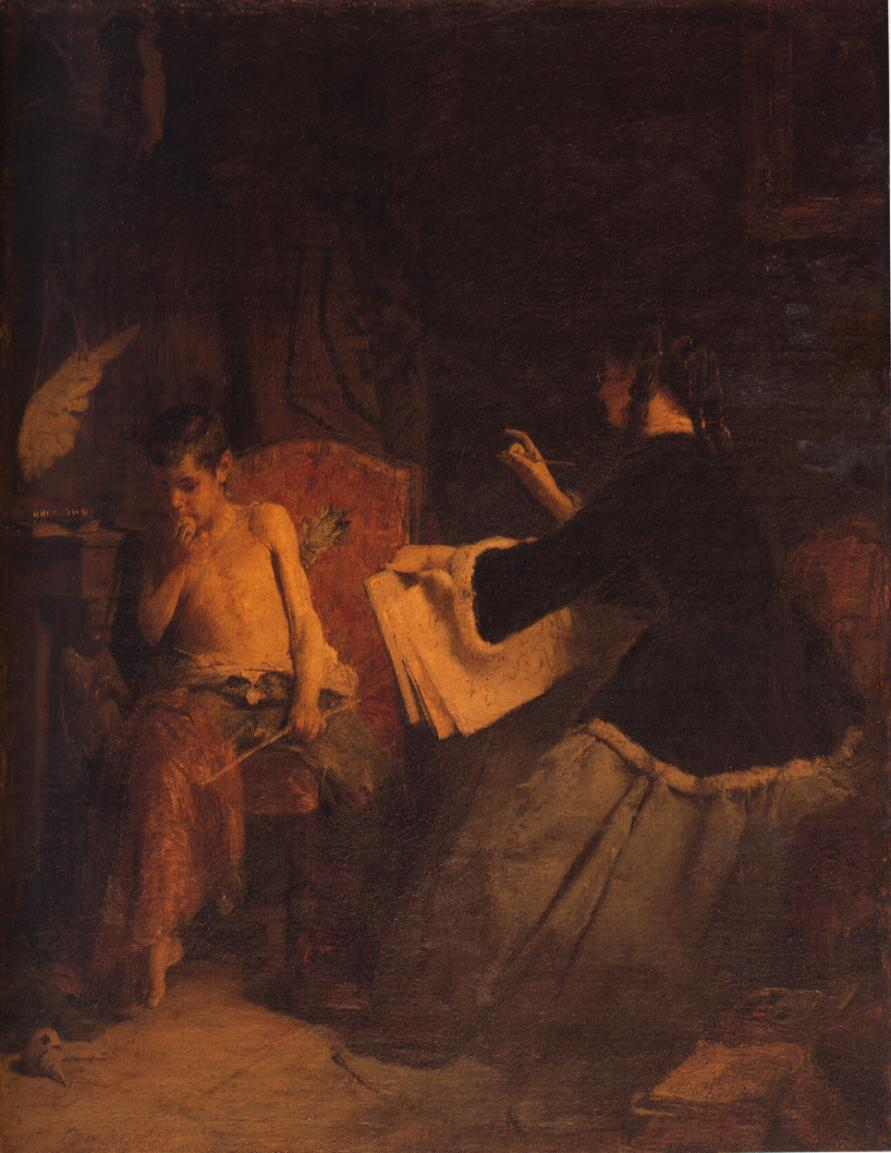
Eros and the Painter

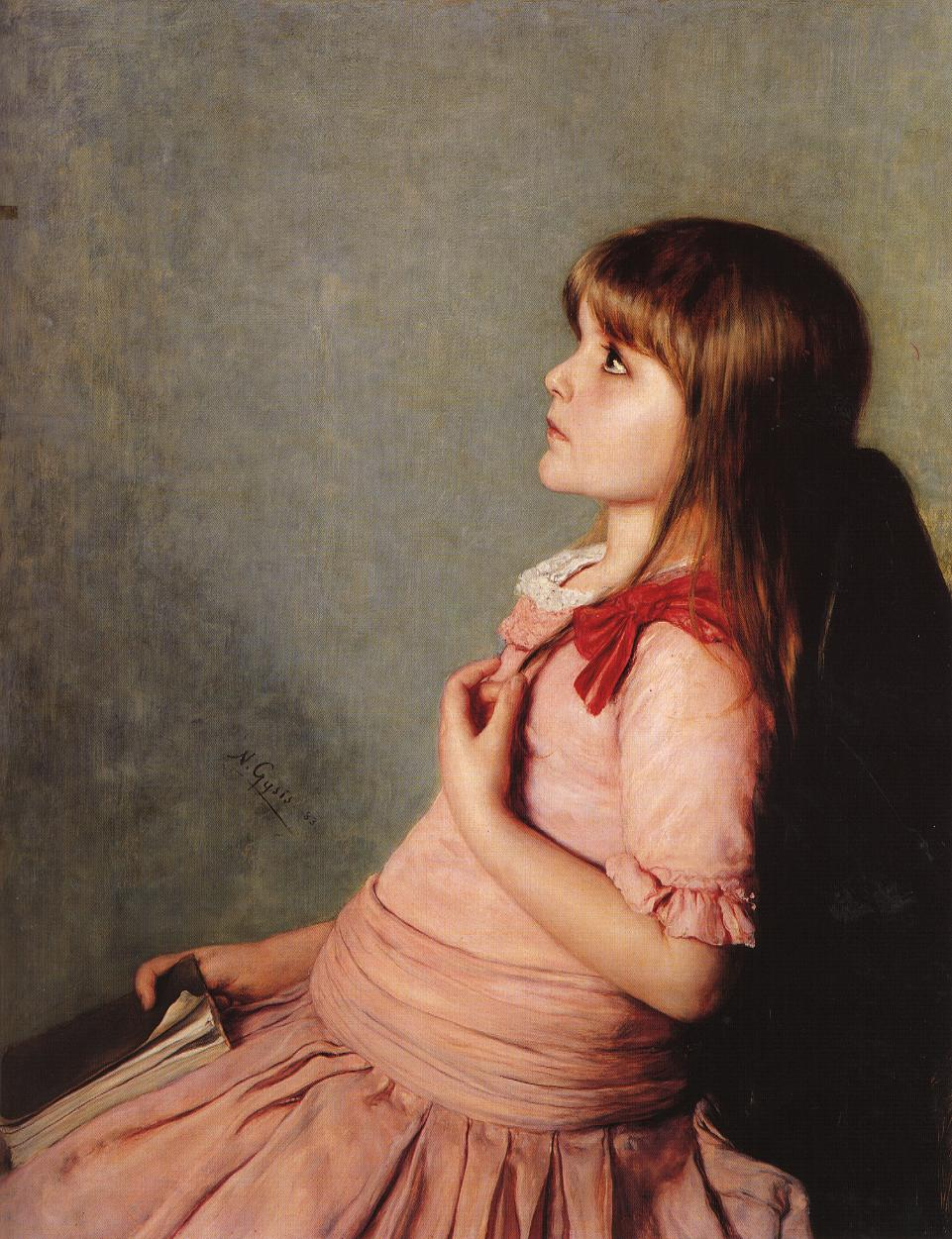
Learning by Heart

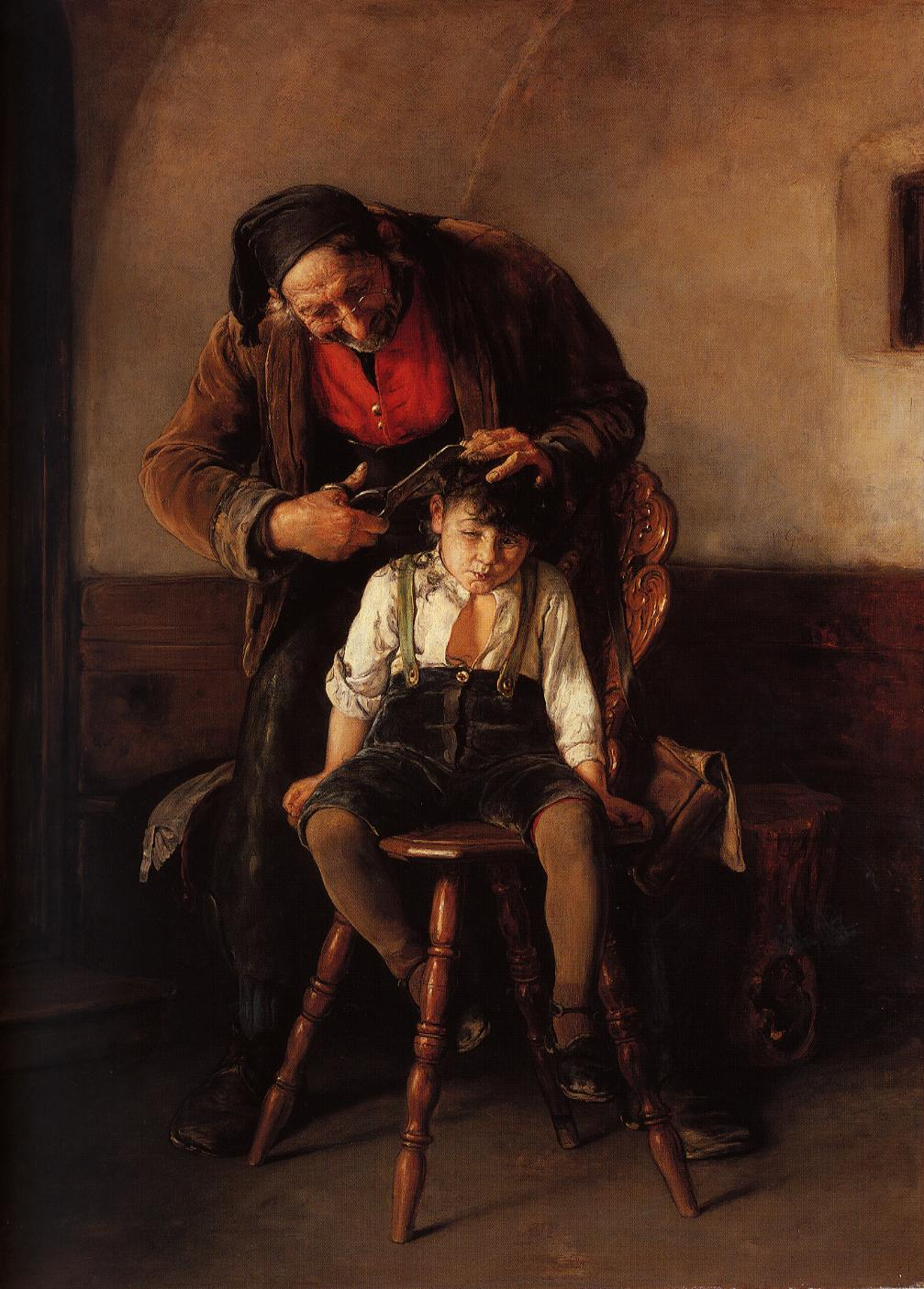
The Barber (1880)

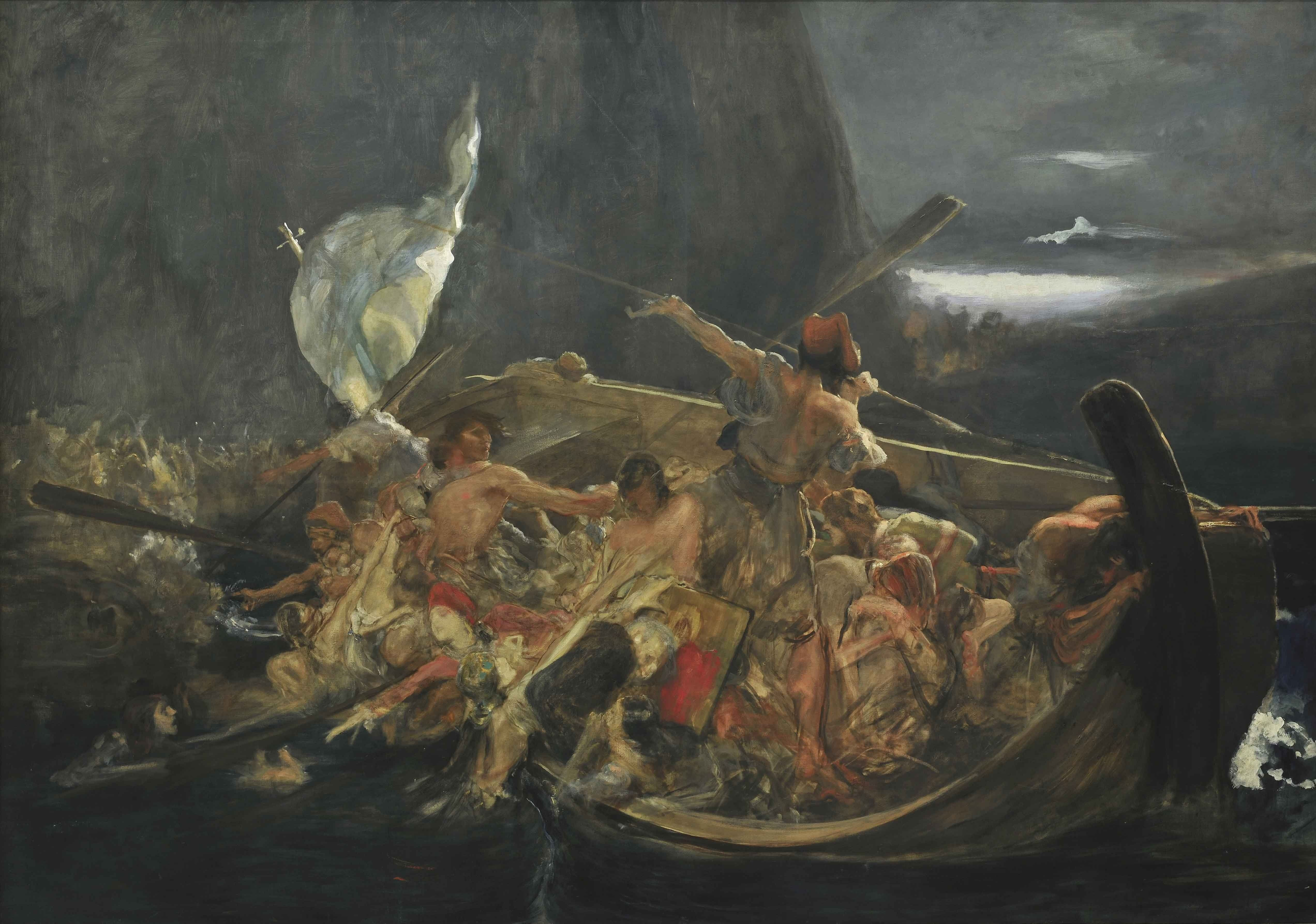
After the destruction of Psara

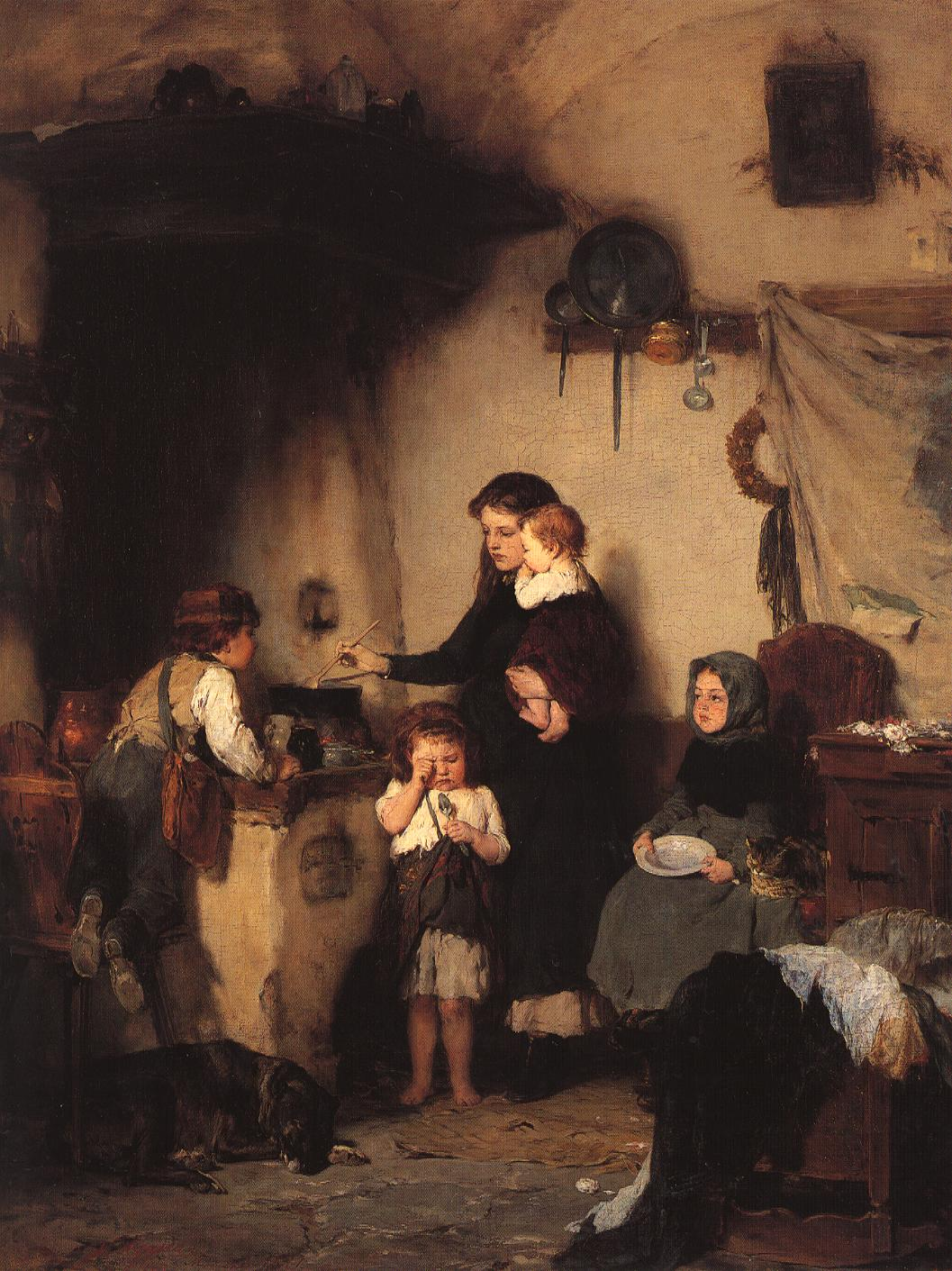
The orphans

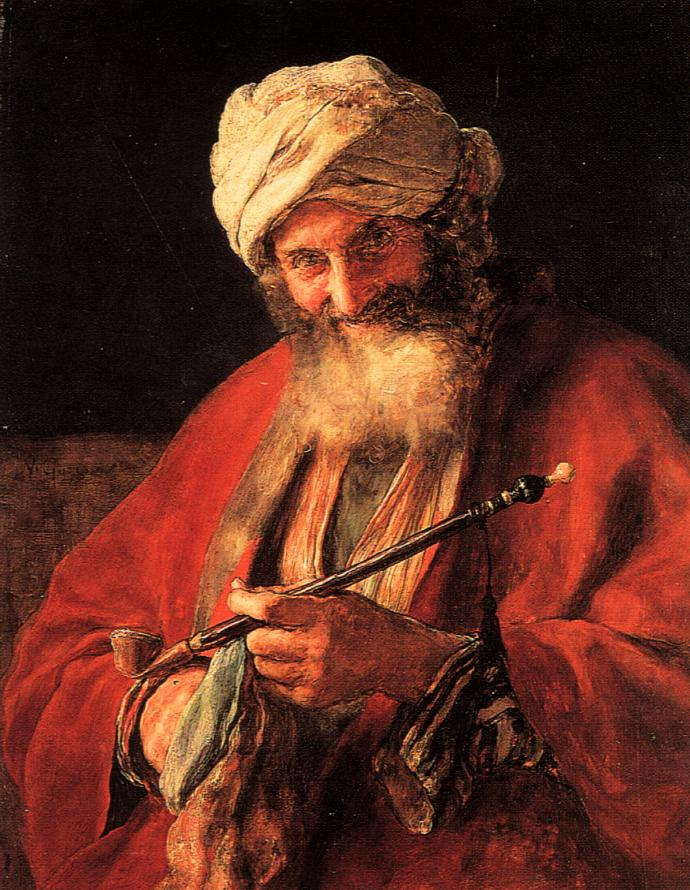
Oriental man with pipe

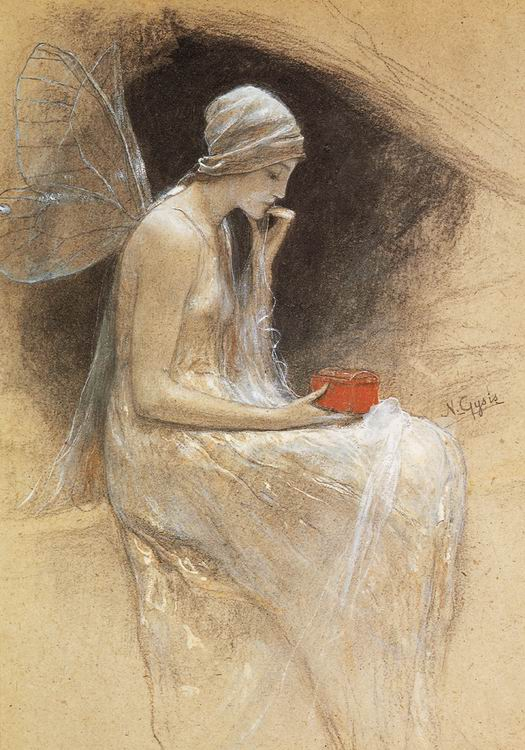
Artist's psyche

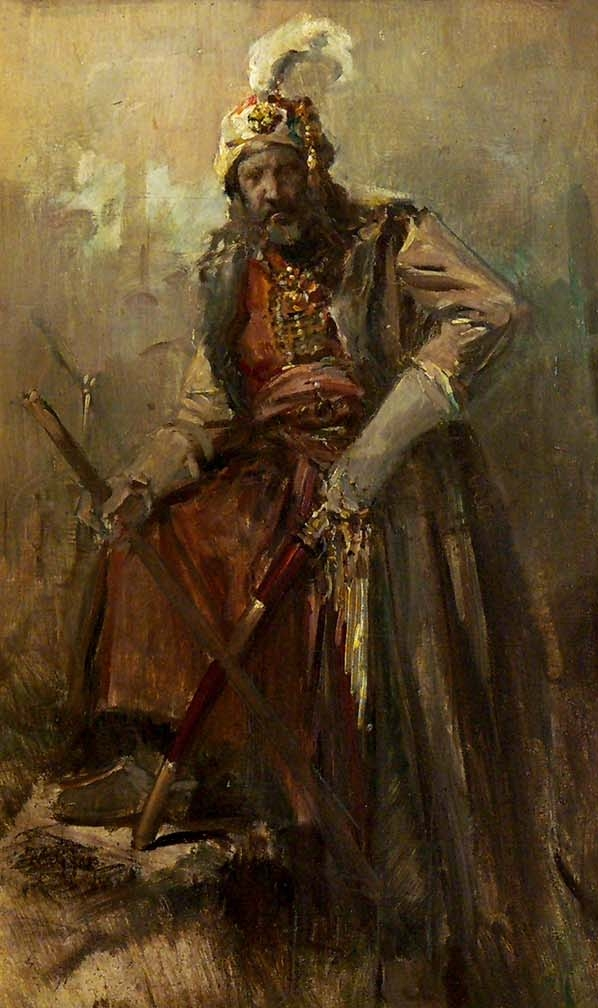
Oriental Warrior

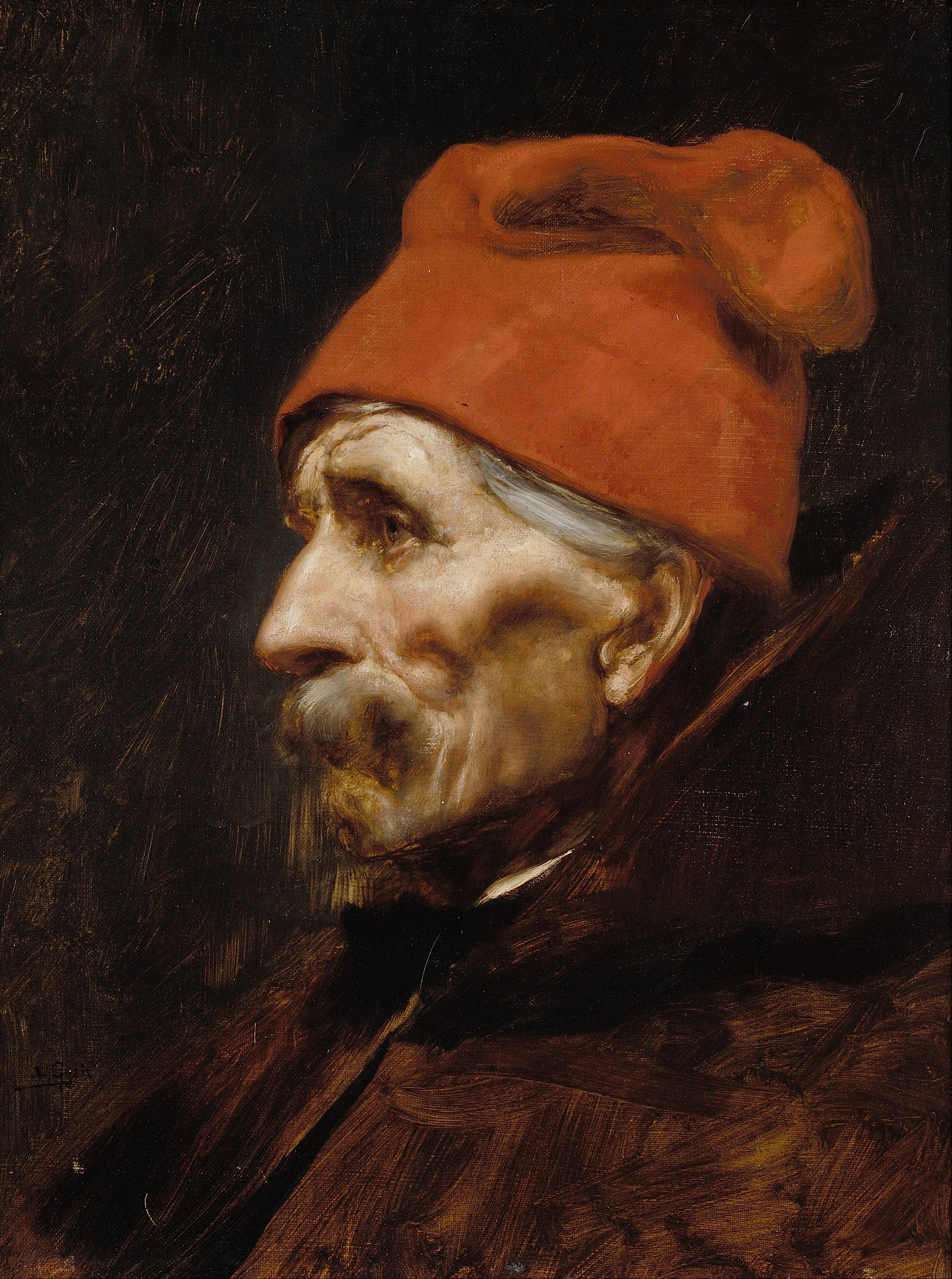
Old man wearing a red fez

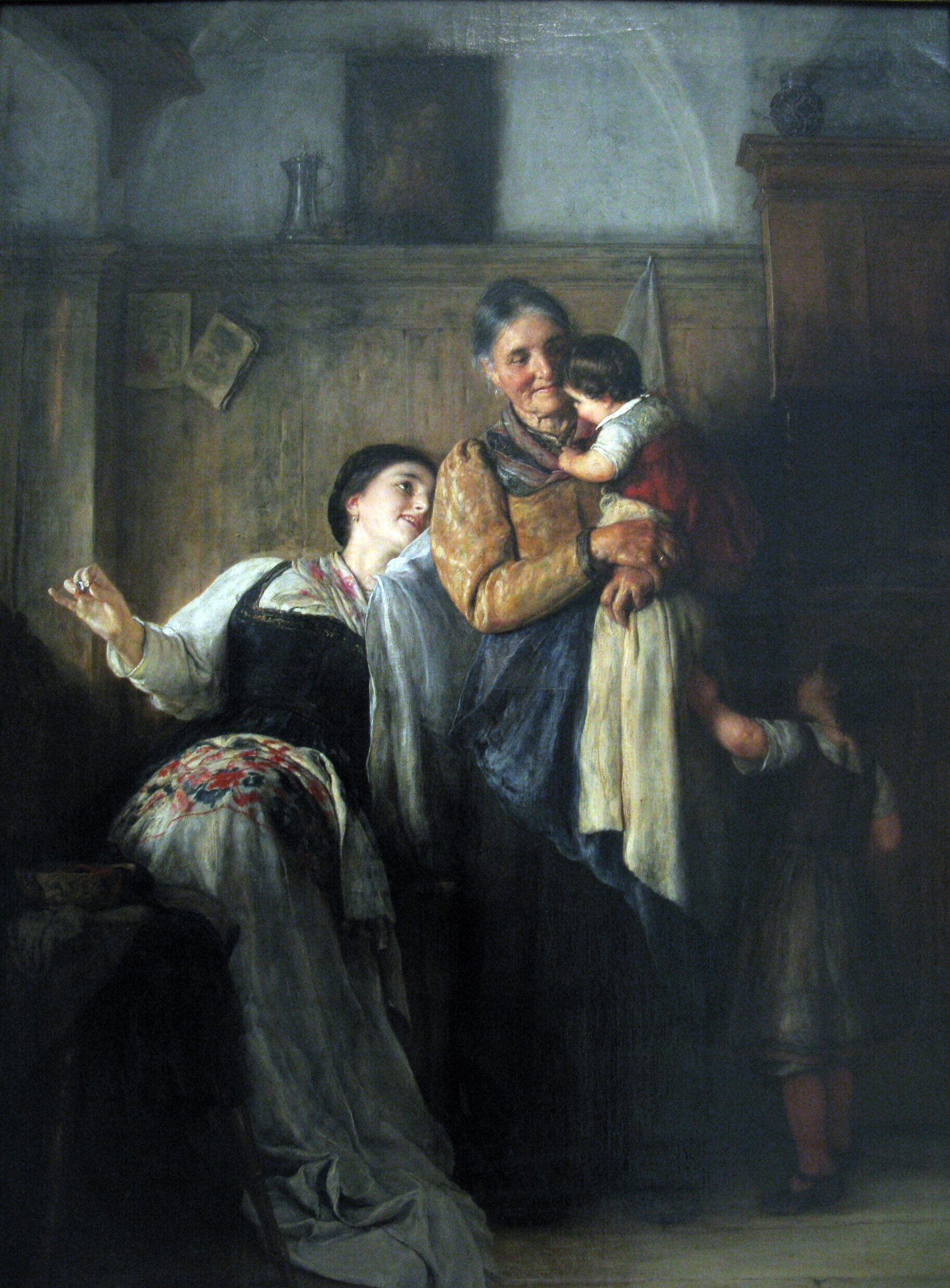
Peek-a-Boo (1882)

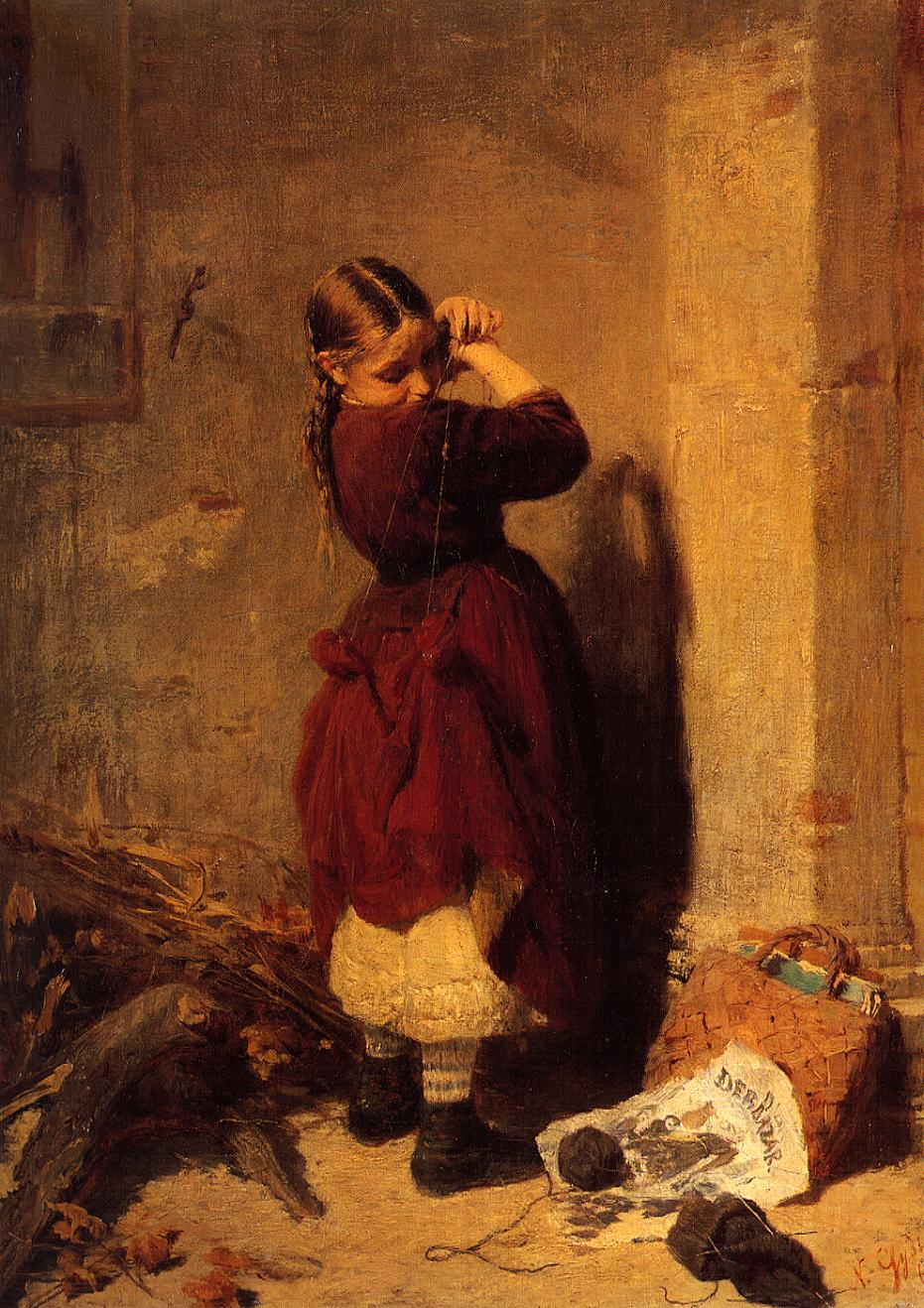
Girl Playing (1868)

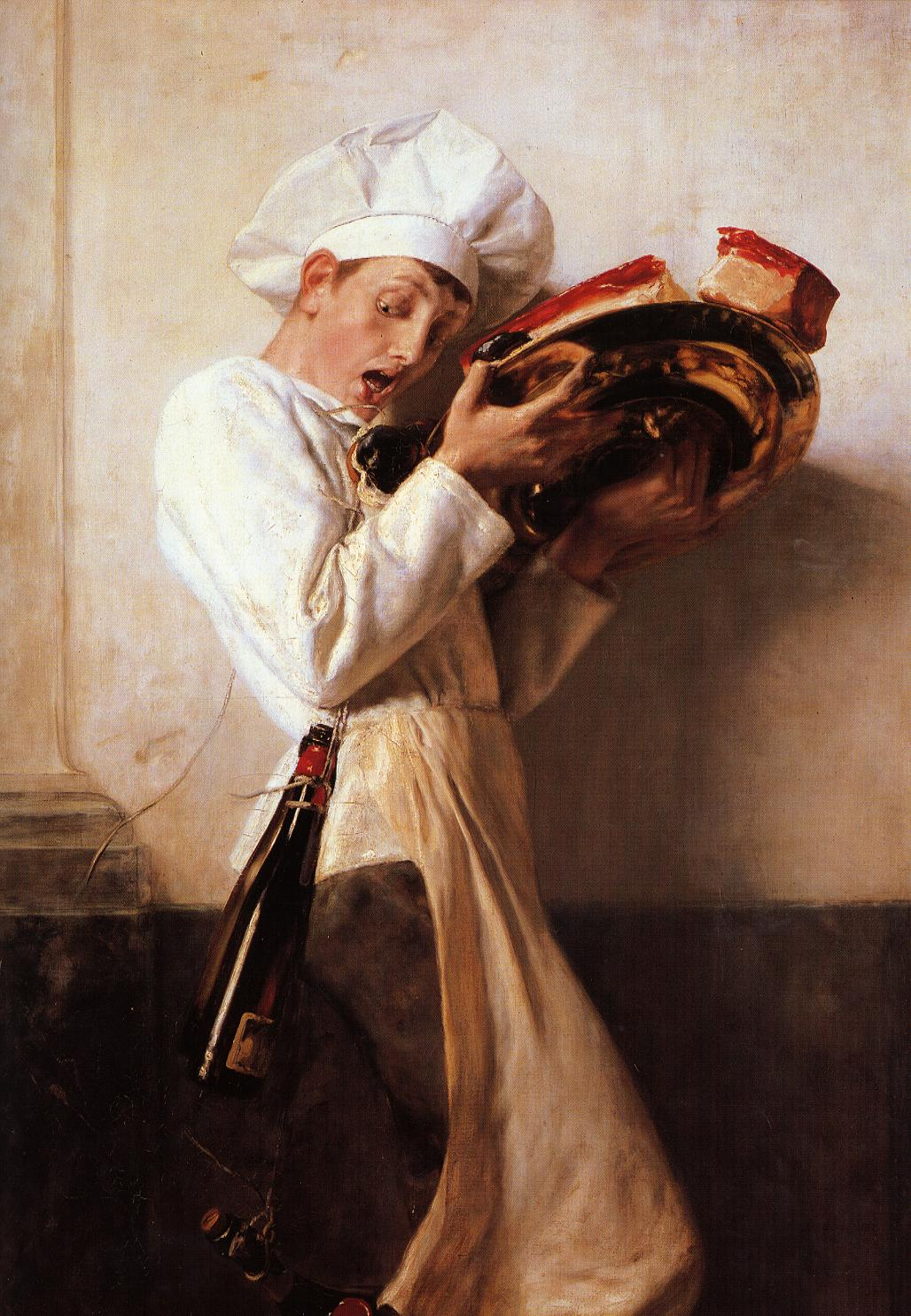
Pastryman

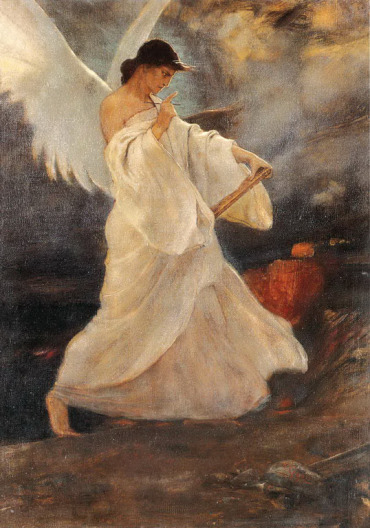
The Glory of Psara

== See also ==
- Munich School
- National Gallery of Athens
- Art in modern Greece
- Greek Art
- Emfietzoglou Gallery
