= Secret Teaching Organisation =

Underground Polish educational organisation

- Tajna Organizacja Nauczycielska
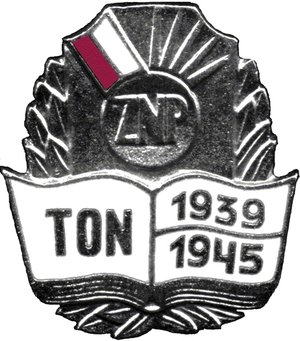
- Post-war badge
- Abbreviation: TON
- Formation: October 26, 1939; 86 years ago
- Founders: Zygmunt Nowicki, Kazimierz Maj, Wacław Tułodziecki, Teofil Wojeński, Czesław Wycech
- Founded at: Warsaw, German-occupied Poland
- Location: Poland

Secret Teaching Organisation (Polish: Tajna Organizacja Nauczycielska, TON also translated as the Secret Teaching Society or Clandestine Teaching Organisation) was an underground Polish educational organisation created in 1939 after the German invasion of Poland to provide underground education in occupied Poland during World War II.

The organisation was created towards the end of October 1939 in Warsaw response to German closure of most Polish educational institutions and repressions against teachers. To forestall the rise of a new generation of educated Poles, German officials decreed that Polish children's schooling should end after a few years of elementary education. Heinrich Himmler wrote in a May 1940 memorandum, "The sole purpose of this schooling is to teach them simple arithmetic, nothing above the number 500; writing one's name; and the doctrine that it is divine law to obey the Germans... I do not think that a knowledge of reading is desirable." Most schools were closed, many teachers were arrested and even executed during the purges of Polish intelligentsia, in the remaining schools, curriculum was heavily censored, textbooks were confiscated, libraries closed.

The organisation concentrated on the primary education. Over time, it expanded into secondary education. It provided assistance to teachers in need, for example to the ones deported from the Polish territories annexed by Nazi Germany, or to the ones in hiding with arrest warrants. It provided assistance to the families of teachers who had been imprisoned or killed, or who were in hiding. It was also involved in the underground printing and distribution of textbooks.

Norman Davies notes that the organisation undertook the education of a million children. By 1942, about 1,500,000 students took part in the organisation underground primary education; in 1944, its secondary school system covered 100,000 people and the university level courses, about 10,000.

The organisation cooperated closely with the Polish government in exile (by which it was subsidized) and the Polish Underground State. Its network covered the whole of Poland, roughly corresponding to the pre-war educational structure of the Second Polish Republic, and was most organized in the General Government. Thousands of its members were arrested and killed by the Germans. It is estimated that about 15% of Polish teachers or 8,000 died during the occupation period.

Founders and main activists of the organisation, many of whom were connected to the pre-war Association of Polish Teachers (Związek Nauczycielstwa Polskiego), included: Zygmunt Nowicki, Kazimierz Maj, Wacław Tułodziecki, Teofil Wojeński and Czesław Wycech.

In 1945 the organisation became the basis of the reestablished Association of Polish Teachers; however, it also became controlled by the Soviet-installed communist government.
