= Bierut and Cyrankiewicz cabinet =

Government Poland (1952–1957)

Cabinet of Bolesław Bierut and Józef Cyrankiewicz
- 1st & 2nd governments of the People's Republic of Poland

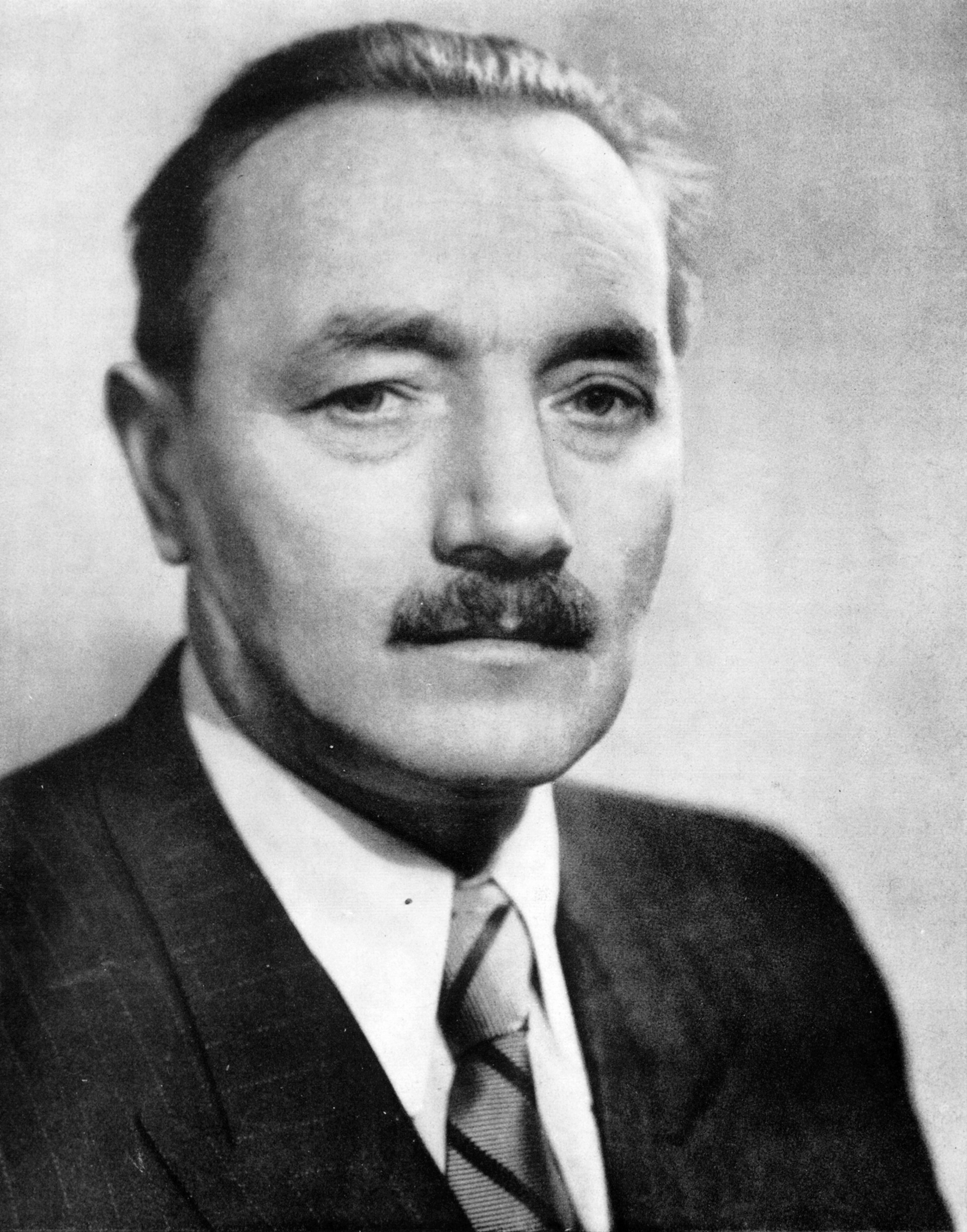
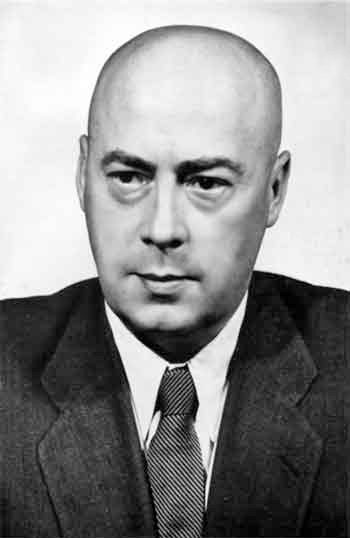
- Date formed: 21 November 1952
- Date dissolved: 20 February 1957

People and organisations
- Head of government: Boleslaw Bierut from 1952 to 1954, Józef Cyrankiewicz from 1954 to 1957
- No. of ministers: 39

History
- Predecessor: Cyrankiewicz I
- Successor: Cyrankiewicz II

The governments of Bolesław Bierut and Józef Cyrankiewicz were governments led first by Bolesław Bierut from 1952 to 1954, and then by Józef Cyrankiewicz from 1954 to 1956. Bolesław Bierut, who served as President of Poland from 1947 to 1952 and as General Secretary of the Central Committee of the Polish United Workers' Party from 1948 to 1956, was elected Prime Minister of Poland on November 20, 1952, by the 1st Sejm of the People's Republic of Poland, after the first government of Józef Cyrankiewicz resigned. On November 21, 1952, the Sejm appointed the ministers of the Bierut government. The Council of Ministers was composed of 39 members: the Prime Minister, 8 Deputy Prime Ministers and 30 ministers. Four ministries remained vacant. In 1954, Bolesław Bierut was dismissed from the position of Prime Minister and replaced by the former Deputy Prime Minister, Józef Cyrankiewicz. There were major changes in the composition of the Council of Ministers, first caused by the dismissal of Bolesław Bierut in 1954 and later by the events of Polish October. On February 20, 1957, the government submitted the resignation of the cabinet to the 2nd Sejm, which officially ended a week later when the second government of Józef Cyrankiewicz was appointed.

== Council of Ministers of Bolesław Bierut and Józef Cyrankiewicz (1952–1957) ==
Ministry	Name	Time in office	
Ministry	Name	Took office	Left office
Prime Minister	Bolesław Bierut (PZPR)	November 20, 1952	March 18, 1954
Deputy Prime Minister	Józef Cyrankiewicz (PZPR)	November 21, 1952	March 18, 1954
Prime Minister	Józef Cyrankiewicz (PZPR)	March 18, 1954	February 20, 1957
Vice-President of the Council of Ministers	Władysław Dworakowski (PZPR)	November 21, 1952	March 18, 1954
Chairman of the Committee for Public Security of the Council of Ministers	Władysław Dworakowski (PZPR)	December 14, 1954	March 30, 1956
Vice-President of the Council of Ministers	Tadeusz Gede (PZPR)	November 21, 1952	October 24, 1956
Vice-President of the Council of Ministers	Piotr Jaroszewicz (PZPR)	November 21, 1952	February 27, 1957
Ministry of Mining (Note: Until April 29, 1955, Minister of Mining ({{{title}}}, Dz. U., {{{year}}}, No. {{{number}}} ).)	Piotr Jaroszewicz (PZPR)	May 14, 1954	March 23, 1956
Vice-President of the Council of Ministers	Stefan Jędrychowski (PZPR)	November 21, 1952	October 24, 1956
Chairman of the Planning Commission at the Council of Ministers (Note: Until January 1, 1957, chairman of the State Economic Planning Commission ({{{title}}}, Dz. U., {{{year}}}, No. {{{number}}} ).)	Stefan Jędrychowski (PZPR)	July 11, 1956	February 27, 1957
Vice-President of the Council of Ministers	Hilary Minc (PZPR)	November 21, 1952	March 18, 1954
Chairman of the State Economic Planning Commission	Hilary Minc (PZPR)	November 21, 1952	March 18, 1954
1st Deputy Prime Minister	Hilary Minc (PZPR)	March 18, 1954	October 10, 1956
Vice-President of the Council of Ministers	Zenon Nowak (PZPR)	November 21, 1952	March 18, 1954
1st Deputy Prime Minister	Zenon Nowak (PZPR)	March 18, 1954	October 24, 1956
Vice-President of the Council of Ministers	Zenon Nowak (PZPR)	October 24, 1956	February 27, 1957
Vice-President of the Council of Ministers	Konstanty Rokossowski (PZPR)	November 21, 1952	November 13, 1956
Minister of National Defense	Konstanty Rokossowski (PZPR)	November 21, 1952	November 13, 1956
Minister of Municipal Economy	Feliks Baranowski (PZPR)	November 21, 1952	February 1, 1956
Minister of Education	Feliks Baranowski (PZPR)	September 11, 1956	November 13, 1956
Minister of Industrial Construction	Czesław Bąbiński (PZPR)	November 21, 1952	July 14, 1956
Minister of State Agricultural Farms	Hilary Chełchowski (PZPR)	November 21, 1952	December 7, 1954
Minister of Foreign Trade	Konstanty Dąbrowski (PZPR)	November 21, 1952	December 9, 1956
Minister of Agriculture	Jan Dąb-Kocioł (ZSL)	November 21, 1952	March 18, 1954
Minister of Forestry	Jan Dąb-Kocioł (ZSL)	March 18, 1954	July 16, 1956
Minister of Forestry and Wood Industry	Jan Dąb-Kocioł (ZSL)	July 17, 1956	February 27, 1957
Minister of Finance	Tadeusz Dietrich (PZPR)	November 21, 1952	February 27, 1957
Minister of Agricultural and Food Industry	Mieczysław Hoffmann (PZPR)	November 21, 1952	July 16, 1956
Minister of Food Industry	Mieczysław Hoffmann (PZPR)	July 17, 1956	February 27, 1957
Minister of Education	Witold Jarosiński (PZPR)	November 21, 1952	August 4, 1956
Minister of Energy	Bolesław Jaszczuk (PZPR)	November 21, 1952	July 7, 1956
Minister of Machinery Industry	Bolesław Jaszczuk (PZPR)	July 7, 1956	February 27, 1957
Minister-head of the Office of the Council of Ministers	Kazimierz Mijal (PZPR)	November 21, 1952	February 1, 1956
Minister of Municipal Economy	Kazimierz Mijal (PZPR)	February 1, 1956	February 27, 1957
Minister of Internal Trade	Marian Minor (PZPR)	November 21, 1952	February 27, 1957
Minister of Mining	Ryszard Nieszporek (PZPR)	November 21, 1952	May 14, 1954
Minister of Town and Estate Construction	Roman Piotrowski (PZPR)	November 21, 1952	July 14, 1956
Minister of Forestry	Bolesław Podedworny (ZSL)	November 21, 1952	March 18, 1954
Minister of Shipping	Mieczysław Popiel (PZPR)	November 21, 1952	November 13, 1956
Minister of Public Security	Stanisław Radkiewicz (PZPR)	November 21, 1952	December 14, 1954
Minister of State Agricultural Farms	Stanisław Radkiewicz (PZPR)	December 7, 1954	April 19, 1956
Minister of Higher Education	Adam Rapacki (PZPR)	November 21, 1952	April 27, 1956
Minister of Foreign Affairs	Adam Rapacki (PZPR)	April 27, 1956	February 27, 1957
Minister of Chemical Industry	Bolesław Rumiński (PZPR)	November 21, 1952	February 27, 1957
Minister of Road and Air Transport	Jan Rustecki (PZPR)	November 21, 1952	February 27, 1957
Minister of Foreign Affairs	Stanisław Skrzeszewski (PZPR)	November 21, 1952	April 27, 1956
Minister of Culture and Art	Włodzimierz Sokorski (PZPR)	November 21, 1952	April 19, 1956
Minister of Light Industry	Eugeniusz Stawiński (PZPR)	November 21, 1952	February 27, 1957
Vice-President of the Council of Ministers	Eugeniusz Stawiński (PZPR)	May 4, 1956	October 24, 1956
Minister of Railways	Ryszard Strzelecki (PZPR)	November 21, 1952	February 27, 1957
Minister of Health (Note: ({{{title}}}, Dz. U., 1960, vol. 20, No. 119 ).)	Jerzy Sztachelski (PZPR)	November 21, 1952	November 13, 1956
Minister without portfolio	Jerzy Sztachelski (PZPR)	November 13, 1956	February 27, 1957
Minister of Communications (Note: Until March 15, 1955 Minister of Posts and Telegraphs ({{{title}}}, Dz. U., {{{year}}}, No. {{{number}}} ).)	Wacław Szymanowski (ZSL)	November 21, 1952	June 13, 1956
Minister of Justice	Henryk Świątkowski (PZPR)	November 21, 1952	April 21, 1956
Minister of Machinery Industry	Julian Tokarski (PZPR)	November 21, 1952	April 16, 1955
Minister of the Automotive Industry	Julian Tokarski (PZPR)	April 22, 1955	June 20, 1956
Minister of Small Industry and Crafts	Adam Żebrowski (PZPR)	November 21, 1952	September 20, 1954
Minister of Metallurgy	Kiejstut Żemaitis (PZPR)	November 21, 1952	February 27, 1957
Minister of State Control	Franciszek Jóźwiak (PZPR)	December 12, 1952	April 16, 1955
Vice-President of the Council of Ministers	Franciszek Jóźwiak (PZPR)	April 16, 1955	October 24, 1956
Minister of Purchase	Antoni Mierzwiński (PZPR)	April 9, 1953	February 27, 1957
Vice-President of the Council of Ministers	Jakub Berman (PZPR)	March 18, 1954	May 4, 1956
Minister of Agriculture	Edmund Pszczółkowski (PZPR)	March 18, 1954	March 30, 1956
Chairman of the Committee for Public Security at the Council of Ministers	Edmund Pszczółkowski (PZPR)	March 30, 1956	November 28, 1956
Chairman of the State Economic Planning Commission	Eugeniusz Szyr (PZPR)	March 18, 1954	July 11, 1956
Minister of Construction	Eugeniusz Szyr (PZPR)	July 14, 1956	November 13, 1956
Vice-President of the Council of Ministers	Stanisław Łapot (PZPR)	May 14, 1954	October 24, 1956
Minister of Internal Affairs	Władysław Wicha (PZPR)	December 14, 1954	February 27, 1957
Minister of Building Materials Industry	Stefan Pietrusiewicz (PZPR)	March 1, 1955	February 27, 1957
Minister of Machinery Industry	Roman Fidelski (PZPR)	April 16, 1955	July 7, 1956
Minister of State Control	Roman Zambrowski (PZPR)	April 16, 1955	October 24, 1956
Minister of Coal Mining	Franciszek Waniołka (PZPR)	March 23, 1956	February 27, 1957
Minister of Labor and Social Welfare	Stanisław Zawadzki (PZPR)	March 23, 1956	February 27, 1957
Minister of Agriculture	Antoni Kuligowski (PZPR)	March 30, 1956	January 10, 1957
Minister of Culture and Art	Karol Kuryluk (PZPR)	April 19, 1956	February 27, 1957
Minister of State Agricultural Farms	Mieczysław Moczar (PZPR)	April 19, 1956	December 1, 1956
Minister of Justice	Zofia Wasilkowska (PZPR)	April 27, 1956	February 27, 1957
Minister of Higher Education	Stefan Żółkiewski (PZPR)	April 27, 1956	February 27, 1957
Minister of Communications	Jan Rabanowski (SD)	June 13, 1956	February 27, 1957
Minister of small industry and crafts	Zygmunt Moskwa (SD)	July 13, 1956	February 27, 1957
Vice-President of the Council of Ministers	Stefan Ignar (ZSL)	October 24, 1956	February 27, 1957
Minister of Health	Rajmund Barański	November 13, 1956	February 27, 1957
Minister of Education	Władysław Bieńkowski (PZPR)	November 13, 1956	February 27, 1957
Minister of Shipping	Stanisław Darski	November 13, 1956	February 27, 1957
Minister of National Defence	Marian Spychalski (PZPR)	November 13, 1956	February 27, 1957
Minister of Foreign Trade	Witold Trąmpczyński (PZPR)	December 9, 1956	February 27, 1957
Minister of Agriculture	Edward Ochab (PZPR)	January 10, 1957	February 27, 1957

== On the day of his swearing-in, November 21, 1952 ==
- Bolesław Bierut (PZPR) – President of the Council of Ministers
- Józef Cyrankiewicz (PZPR) – Deputy President of the Council of Ministers
- Władysław Dworakowski (PZPR) – Vice-President of the Council of Ministers
- Tadeusz Gede (PZPR) – Vice-President of the Council of Ministers
- Piotr Jaroszewicz (PZPR) – Vice-President of the Council of Ministers
- Stefan Jędrychowski (PZPR) – Vice-President of the Council of Ministers
- Hilary Minc (PZPR) – Vice-President of the Council of Ministers
- Zenon Nowak (PZPR) – Vice-President of the Council of Ministers
- Konstanty Rokossowski (PZPR) – Vice-President of the Council of Ministers, Minister of National Defense
- Feliks Baranowski (PZPR) – Minister of Municipal Economy
- Czesław Bąbiński (PZPR) – Minister of Industrial Construction
- Hilary Chełchowski (PZPR) – Minister of State Agricultural Farms
- Konstanty Dąbrowski (PZPR) – Minister of Foreign Trade
- Jan Dąb-Kocioł (ZSL) – Minister of Agriculture
- Tadeusz Dietrich (PZPR) – Minister of Finance
- Mieczysław Hoffmann (PZPR) – Minister of Agricultural and Food Industry
- Witold Jarosiński (PZPR) – Minister of Education
- Bolesław Jaszczuk (PZPR) – Minister of Energy
- Kazimierz Mijal (PZPR) – minister-head of the Office of the Council of Ministers
- Marian Minor (PZPR) – Minister of Internal Trade
- Ryszard Nieszporek (PZPR) – Minister of Mining
- Roman Piotrowski (PZPR) – Minister of Construction of Cities and Housing Estates
- Bolesław Podedworny (ZSL) – Minister of Forestry
- Mieczysław Popiel (PZPR) – Minister of Shipping
- Stanisław Radkiewicz (PZPR) – Minister of Public Security
- Adam Rapacki (PZPR) – Minister of Higher Education
- Bolesław Rumiński (PZPR) – Minister of Chemical Industry
- Jan Rustecki (PZPR) – Minister of Road and Air Transport
- Stanisław Skrzeszewski (PZPR) – Minister of Foreign Affairs
- Włodzimierz Sokorski (PZPR) – Minister of Culture and Art
- Eugeniusz Stawiński (PZPR) – Minister of Light Industry
- Ryszard Strzelecki (PZPR) – Minister of Railways
- Jerzy Sztachelski (PZPR) – Minister of Health
- Wacław Szymanowski (ZSL) – Minister of Posts and Telegraphs
- Henryk Świątkowski (PZPR) – Minister of Justice
- Julian Tokarski (PZPR) – Minister of Machinery Industry
- Adam Żebrowski (PZPR) – Minister of Small Industry and Crafts
- Kiejstut Żemaitis (PZPR) – Minister of Metallurgy
- vacancy – Minister of Labor and Social Welfare
- vacancy – Minister of Wood and Paper Industry
- vacancy – Minister of the Building Materials Industry
- vacancy – Minister of Meat and Dairy Industry

== Changes in the composition of the Council of Ministers ==
- March 25, 1953:
  - Creation of the Ministry of Purchase.
- April 9, 1953:
  - Nomination – Antoni Mierzwiński (PZPR) – Minister of Purchase.
- March 18, 1954:
  - Dismissals: Bolesław Bierut from the position of Prime Minister, Władysław Dworakowski from the position of Deputy Prime Minister, Hilary Minc from the position of Chairman of PKPG, Bolesław Podedworny from the position of Minister of Forestry and Jan Dąb-Kocioł from the position of Minister of Agriculture.
  - Appointments: Józef Cyrankiewicz – President of the Council of Ministers (previously Vice-President of the Council of Ministers), Hilary Minc – First Deputy Prime Minister of the Council of Ministers (previously Vice-President of the Council of Ministers and Chairman of PKPG); Zenon Nowak – 2nd Deputy Prime Minister (previously Vice-President of the Council of Ministers); Jakub Berman (PZPR) – Vice-President of the Council of Ministers; Eugeniusz Szyr (PZPR) – chairman of PKPG; Jan Dąb-Kocioł (ZSL) – Minister of Forestry (re: Minister of Agriculture); Edmund Pszczółkowski (PZPR) – Minister of Agriculture.
- 14 houses in 1954:
  - Dismissal – Ryszard Nieszporek from the position of Minister of Mining.
  - Appointments: Stanisław Łapot (PZPR) – Vice-President of the Council of Ministers; Piotr Jaroszewicz (PZPR) – Minister of Mining.
- September 20, 1954:
  - Adam Żebrowski was dismissed from the position of Minister of Small Industry and Crafts, and the duties of the head of the ministry were taken over by Mikołaj Olszewski (PZPR), regarding Secretary of State.
- December 7, 1954:
  - Elimination of the Ministry of Public Security and creation of the Minister of Internal Affairs and the Committee for Public Security under the Council of Ministers.
  - Dismissal of Hilary Chełchowski from the position of minister of state agricultural farms,
  - Appointments: Stanisław Radkiewicz – Minister of State Agricultural Farms (regarding Minister of Public Security); Władysław Wicha (PZPR) – Minister of Internal Affairs (concerning Undersecretary of State at the Ministry of State Control); Władysław Dworakowski (PZPR) – chairman of the Committee for Public Security.
- March 1, 1955:
  - Nomination: Stefan Pietrusiewicz (PZPR) – Minister of the building materials industry.
- March 11, 1955:
  - Transformation of the Ministry of Posts and Telegraphs into the Minister of Communications.
- April 16, 1955:
  - Creation of the Ministry of the Automotive Industry; minister – Julian Tokarski regarding the minister of machinery industry.
  - Franciszek Jóźwiak dismissed as Minister of State Control and appointed Vice-President of the Council of Ministers.
  - other Nominations: Roman Zambrowski (PZPR) – minister of state control; Roman Fidelski (PZPR) – Minister of Machinery Industry.
- April 18, 1955:
  - Transformation of the Ministry of Mining into the Ministry of Coal Mining; minister unchanged.
- February 1, 1956:
  - Dismissals: Feliks Baranowski from the position of Minister of Municipal Economy and Kazimierz Mijal from the position of Minister-Head of the Office of the Council of Ministers.
  - Appointment – Kazimierz Mijal – Minister of Municipal Economy.
- March 23, 1956:
  - Dismissal – Piotr Jaroszewicz from the position of Minister of Coal Mining (he was still deputy prime minister).
  - Appointments: Franciszek Waniołka (PZPR) – Minister of Coal Mining; Stanisław Zawadzki (PZPR) – Minister of Labor and Social Welfare.
- March 30, 1956:
  - Dismissals: Edmund Pszczółkowski from the position of Minister of Agriculture and Dworakowski from the position of chairman. Committee for Public Safety.
  - Appointments: Antoni Kuligowski (PZPR) – Minister of Agriculture; Edmund Pszczółkowski – chairman of the Committee for Public Safety.
- April 19, 1956:
  - Stanisław Radkiewicz dismissed from the position of Minister of State Agricultural Farms and appointed Mieczysław Moczar (PZPR); Włodzimierz Sokorski was dismissed from the position of Minister of Culture and Art, and he was replaced by Karol Kuryluk (PZPR).
- April 21, 1956:
  - Henryk Świątkowski dismissed from the position of Minister of Justice.
- April 27, 1956:
  - Dismissals: Adam Rapacki from the position of Minister of Higher Education and Stanisław Skrzeszewski from the position of Minister of Foreign Affairs.
  - Appointments: Adam Rapacki (PZPR) – Minister of Foreign Affairs; Zofia Gawrońska-Wasilkowska (PZPR) – Minister of Justice; prof. Stefan Żółkiewski – Minister of Higher Education.
- 4 houses in 1956:
  - Berman was replaced as Vice-President of the Council of Ministers by the Minister of Light Industry, Eugeniusz Stawiński.
- June 13, 1956:
  - prof. Wacław Szymanowski was dismissed from the position of Minister of Communications and replaced by Jan Rabanowski (SD).
- July 5, 1956:
  - merging the office of the Minister of Industrial Construction and the Minister of Urban and Settlement Construction into the office of the Minister of Construction.
- July 7, 1956:
  - Dismissals: Roman Fidelski from the position of Minister of Machine Industry; Bolesław Jaszczuk from the position of Minister of Energy and Julian Tokarski from the position of Minister of the Automotive Industry.
  - Appointments: Bolesław Jaszczuk – Minister of Machinery Industry; Eugeniusz Zadrzyński (PZPR) – temporary head of the Ministry of Energy.
- July 11, 1956:
  - merging the office of the Minister of Agricultural and Food Industry with the office of the Minister of Meat and Dairy Industry into the office of the Minister of Food Industry; merger of the office of the Minister of Forestry with the office of the Minister of Wood and Paper Industry into the office of the Minister of Forestry and Wood Industry.
  - Dismissal: Eugeniusz Szyr from the position of chairman. PKPG, Czesław Bąbiński as Minister of Industrial Construction and Roman Piotrowski as Minister of Cities and Settlements.
  - Appointments: Stefan Jędrychowski (PZPR) – chairman of PKPG; Eugeniusz Szyr (PZPR) – Minister of Construction.
- July 13, 1956:
  - Appointment – Zygmunt Moskwa (SD) – Minister of small industry and crafts.
- July 16, 1956:
  - Appointments: Jan Dąb-Kocioł (ZSL) – Minister of Forestry and Wood Industry; Mieczysław Hoffmann (PZPR) – Minister of the Food Industry.
- August 4, 1956:
  - Witold Jarosiński dismissed from the position of Minister of Education.
- September 11, 1956:
  - Appointment – Feliks Baranowski (PZPR) – Minister of Education.
- October 10, 1956:
  - Hilary Minc dismissed from the position of First Deputy Prime Minister.
- October 24, 1956:
  - references: Zenon Nowak, Tadeusz Gede, Stefan Jędrychowski, Franciszek Jóźwiak, Stanisław Łapot, Eugeniusz Stawiński, Roman Zambrowski.
  - Appointments: Zenon Nowak – Vice-President of the Council of Ministers; prof. Stefan Ignar (ZSL) – Vice-President of the Council of Ministers; Brig. Gen. Jan Górecki (PZPR) – head of the Ministry of State Control.
- November 13, 1956:
  - references: Konstanty Rokossowski, Feliks Baranowski, Mieczysław Popiel, Jerzy Sztachelski, Eugeniusz Szyr.
  - Appointments: Maj. Gen. Marian Spychalski (PZPR) – Minister of National Defense; Władysław Bieńkowski (PZPR) – Minister of Education; prof. Rajmund Barański (security) – Minister of Health; prof. Stanisław Darski (securities) – Minister of Shipping; Jerzy Sztachelski (PZPR) – minister without portfolio, government plenipotentiary for relations with the Church; Władysław Kopeć (PZPR) – head of the Ministry of Construction.
- November 15, 1956;
  - Elimination of the State Economic Planning Commission and Creation of the Planning Commission under the Council of Ministers.
- December 9, 1956:
  - Minister of Foreign Trade Konstanty Dąbrowski was replaced by prof. Witold Trąmpczyński (PZPR).
- December 31, 1956:
  - Stefan Jędrychowski appointed chairman of the Planning Commission (concerning the chairman of PKPG).
- January 10, 1957:
  - Minister of Agriculture Antoni Kuligowski was replaced by Edward Ochab (PZPR).
