= Pesa Mińsk Mazowiecki =

Polish railway vehicle manufacturing and repair company

- Company type: Private
- Founded: November 29, 1952
- Headquarters: Mińsk Mazowiecki, Poland
- Revenue: 394.812 million PLN (2022)
- Operating income: 16.107 million PLN (2022)
- Net income: 11.689 million PLN (2022)
- Total assets: 302.863 million PLN (2022)
- Total equity: 131.451 million PLN (2022)
- Number of employees: 733 (2020)
- Website: zntkmm.pl

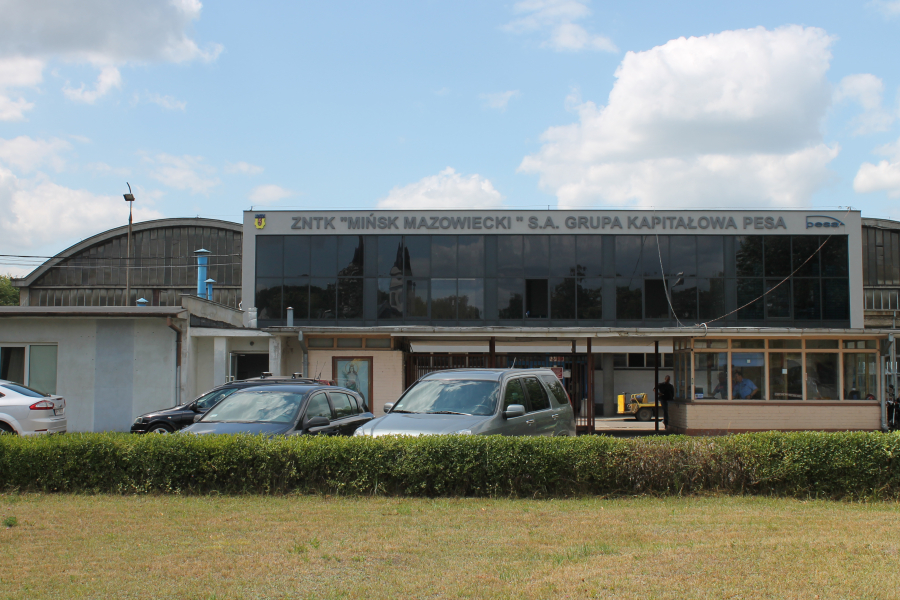
Entrance to the company premises and its halls (2015)

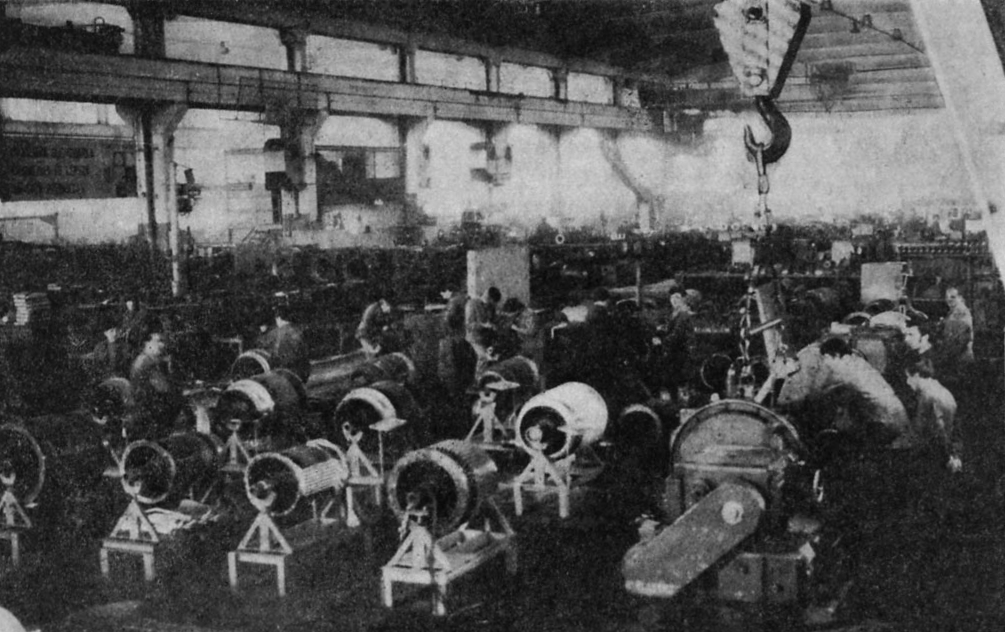
Repair of electric motors in the company's halls (1970s)

Pesa Mińsk Mazowiecki is a company based in Mińsk Mazowiecki, Poland, specializing in the production, modernization, and repair of rolling stock.

The company was founded on 29 November 1952 as the Mińsk Mazowiecki Railway Rolling Stock Repair Works (ZNTK). Initially, it operated under a state-owned industrial association until 1982, when it became part of Polish State Railways (PKP). From 1982 to 1991, it functioned within PKP's structure before becoming an independent state-owned enterprise. On 2 January 1996, it was transformed into a joint-stock company. In 2008, it joined the Pesa capital group, and on 18 February 2022, it was renamed Pesa Mińsk Mazowiecki.

Originally, the company focused on repairing electric rolling stock and electric machines. In the 1990s, it expanded to include repairs of other vehicle types. Between 2010 and 2014, it produced budget versions of Pesa's railbuses.

== History ==
=== Origins ===
After World War II, Poland's railway infrastructure was heavily damaged, and Polish State Railways lacked a dedicated facility for repairing electric rolling stock. Initial repairs were conducted at the Warszawa Grochów locomotive depot, followed by workshops in Pruszków, Lubań, and Gdańsk. More complex repairs, particularly those requiring rewinding of electric machines, were outsourced to the Warsaw Commuter Railway depot in Grodzisk Mazowiecki and the Dolmel factory in Wrocław. The need for a specialized repair facility near the electrified Warsaw railway hub led to the design of the Mińsk Mazowiecki works in 1948, under the direction of engineer Wiktor Tyszka.

In 1951, due to the development of the railway system in Poland, and in particular the Warsaw Railway Junction, a decision was made to establish Zakłady Naprawcze Taboru Kolejowego in Mińsk Mazowiecki. These were intended to serve as a maintenance and repair base for the rolling stock primarily operating suburban routes. On 29 November 1952, the Polish United Workers' Party and the state government passed a resolution to build these facilities, a decision that is considered the founding moment of the company. The plant was allocated an area of over 26 hectares, located near the Mińsk Mazowiecki railway station, between the Warszawa Zachodnia–Terespol railway and the then Świerczewski Street.

=== Part of the industrial association and PKP (1952–1991) ===
The design for the Mińsk Mazowiecki works was developed in 1951 by the Warsaw Industrial Construction Design Bureau, incorporating innovative conoidal structural roofs with a 25-meter span, designed by Zbigniew Ihnatowicz, Jerzy Romański, Witold Sielicki, W. Zaleski, and S. Walczyna. At the beginning of 1953, construction began on the plant named PKP – Mińsk Mazowiecki Electric Rolling Stock Repair Plant (under construction). On 22 July 1954, despite ongoing works, the first electric multiple unit entered the repair hall. That same year, the first three halls were completed, the company's name was changed to Mińsk Mazowiecki Rolling Stock Repair Plant, and its first director was Julian Grodzicki. From the start, the plant operated as an independent enterprise on a full economic accounting basis but was subordinate to the Directorate of Production Plants, established in 1950 (later Zakłady Naprawcze Taboru Kolejowego).

In spring 1954, employees formed a football team, which later became part of the Mazovia Mińsk Mazowiecki sports club. The company also sponsored a table tennis section, formed by merging two clubs, one of which was established by ZNTK workers. Employees also participated in the club's athletics section and later served on its board.

During the 1950s and 1960s, additional facilities were built, including two auxiliary workshop halls, a boiler house, a housing estate, a 735 m^{2} component warehouse, additional repair halls, a fire station, a mechanical carpentry shop, paint and lubricant storage, a steel warehouse, an electrical substation, a carbide storage, and deep wells. The facility's tracks were electrified.

The company initially repaired EMUs of the EW51, EW52, EW53, EN56, and ED70 series. At the end of 1957, a new hall with an area of over 3,000 m^{2} was commissioned, housing a workshop for the repair of electric traction machinery. It specialized in all types of repairs of all electric machines in use at the time and was the first such workshop within the United Rolling Stock Repair Plants Association (ZNTK). In April 1958, a rotor winding workshop was launched, where machines were rewound using pre-manufactured imported components. In August 1959, in cooperation with the Electric Traction Department of the Electrotechnical Institute, the plant began manufacturing its own winding inductors, and later also commutators and other components. Additionally, the plant produced leaf springs and plastic parts for railway rolling stock.

On 1 March 1961, a Central Design and Technological Bureau for Electric Rolling Stock Repairs was established to handle documentation and organizational tasks for electric motor repairs and to develop technical documentation for PKP's electric rolling stock across all ZNTK facilities. That year, administrative, social, and gatehouse buildings, as well as a paint shop, hydro station, plastic processing workshop, test station, impregnation facility, battery room, waste storage, and diesel locomotive garage were constructed.

In 1962, the company implemented technically justified standards and a two-stage technical-organizational subordination program. It collaborated with the Railway Institute in Warsaw, the Institute of Paints and Varnishes in Gliwice, the Institute of Plastics in Gliwice, and Warsaw University of Technology. By 1963, the facility's expansion was completed. In the early 1960s, repairs began on EMUs of the EW55 and EN57 series.

From 1973 to 1990, the company was named after Cuban revolutionary Camilo Cienfuegos. On 1 January 1982, the ZNTK Association was dissolved, and all repair works were integrated into PKP's structure. In 1988, additional halls for EMU repairs were built.

=== State-owned enterprise (1991–1996) ===
In 1991, the Mińsk Mazowiecki works were separated from PKP and operated as an independent state-owned enterprise named the Mińsk Mazowiecki Railway Rolling Stock Repair Works. Due to the poor financial condition of the railway sector, orders decreased, leading to reduced employment. However, the company retained a skilled workforce and essential machinery.

In the mid-1990s, repairs focused primarily on EN57 EMUs (94%), EN71 (5%), and the phasing-out EW55 (1%). Between 1993 and 1995, the company conducted revision repairs combined with modernization of SN81 railbuses. In 1995, modernization of EU07 electric locomotives into the EP07 series began.

=== Joint-stock company (from 1996) ===
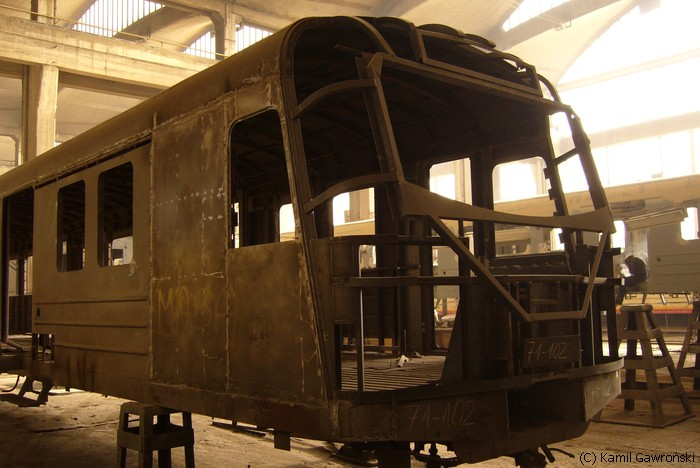
Frame of the front of an EMU modernized to the EN71 km series (2009)

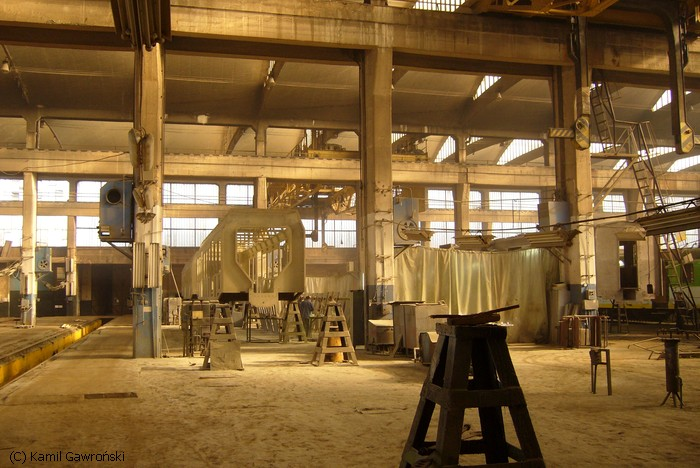
Inside the company hall, on the left frames of 18WE type EMUs (2009)

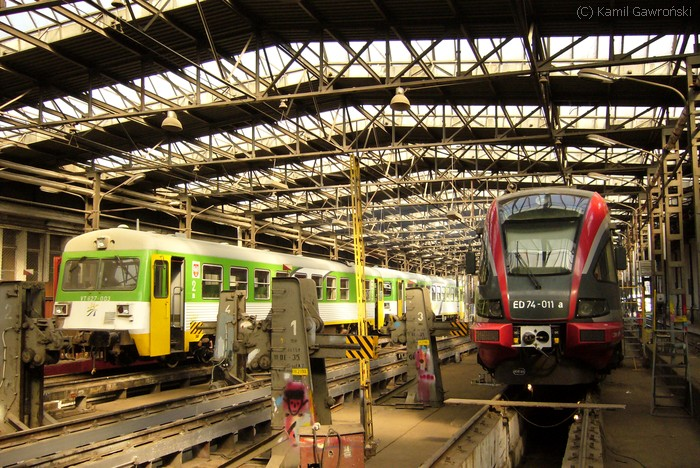
VT627 carriage and ED74 set in the company hall (2009)

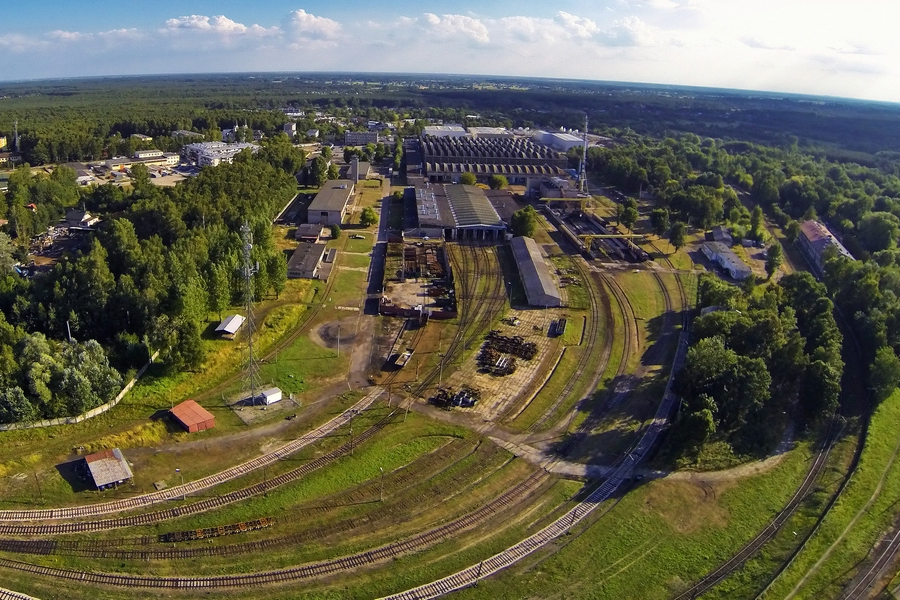
Company grounds seen from above (2013)

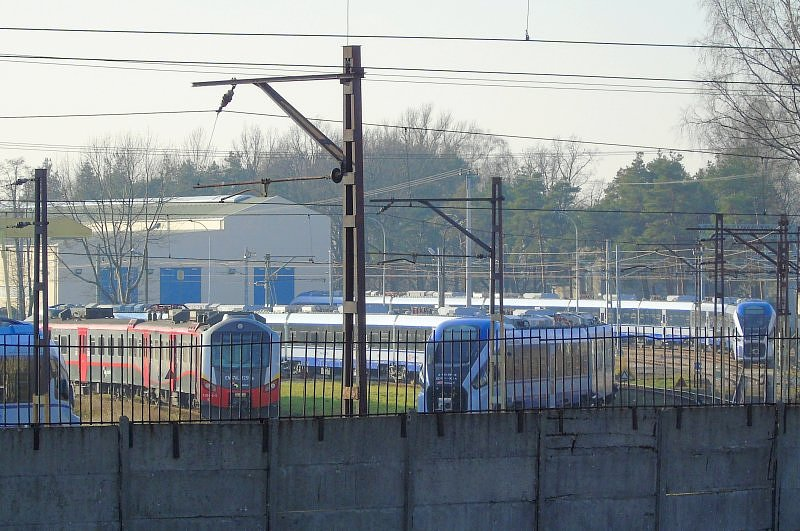
Forklifts on the ZNTK grounds, with their service hall visible in the background (2015)

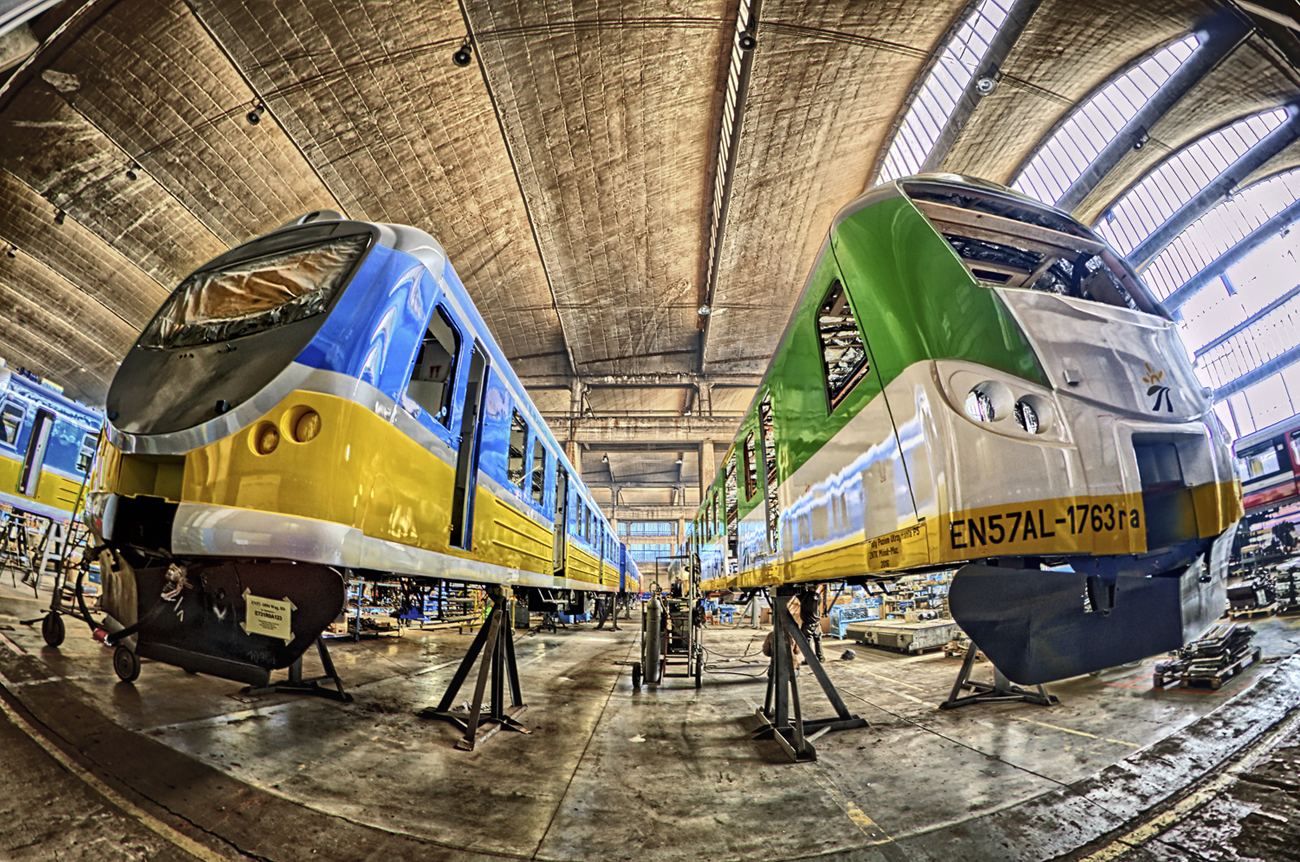
EN57 series EMU undergoing modernization (2016)

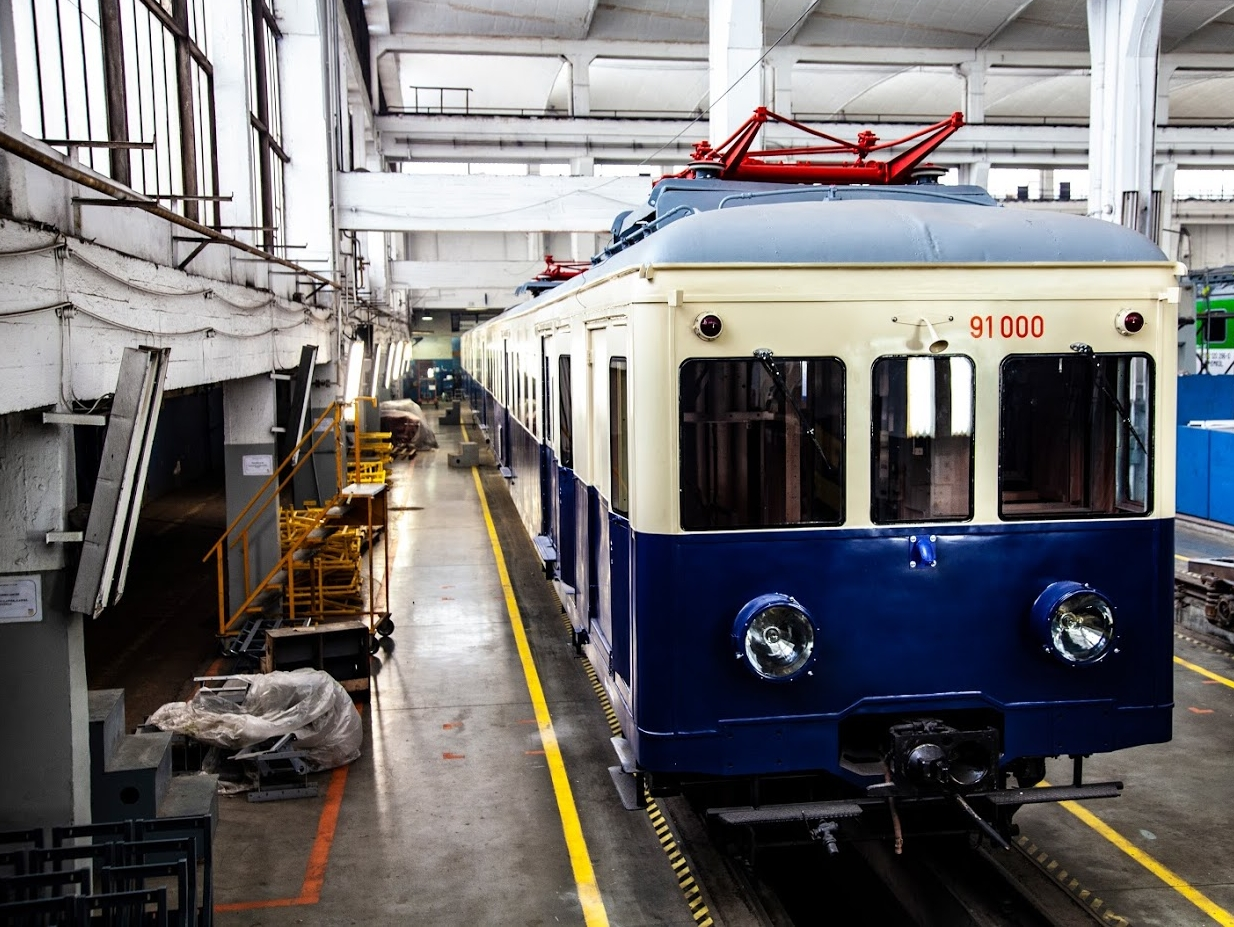
EW51-36 near the end of renovation (2019)

On 2 January 1996, the company was converted into a sole-shareholder company of the State Treasury named Mińsk Mazowiecki Railway Rolling Stock Repair Works S.A. and included in the National Investment Fund "Foksal" under Poland's Universal Privatization Program, marking the start of its privatization. On 1 May 1996, the company transferred its residential blocks to the newly formed Kolejarz Housing Cooperative.

Between 1998 and 2002, a restructuring reduced employment by 24.8%, from 879 in 1998 to 661 in 2001, though production growth in 2002 led to the hiring of 27 additional workers. Between 1999 and 2000, the company fulfilled an order for Croatian Railways, performing major repairs and modernization of two EMUs equivalent to the EN71 series.

In the early 2000s, the company expanded its operations to include repairs of electric locomotives and railroad cars. By mid-2000, it employed 780 people. Adtranz Polska expressed interest in acquiring a 33% stake to expand its rolling stock servicing operations. In 2001, Siemens showed interest in purchasing a majority stake.

In mid-2002, the company began minor modernizations of EN57 EMUs during major repairs, focusing on interior upgrades. On 29 August 2002, the first such modernization was completed for unit EN57-1400 for Przewozy Regionalne in Katowice. On 1 July 2002, 60% of the company's shares were acquired by private investors Surfinia and Feniks Inwestycje, with 25% owned by the State Treasury and 15% by employees.

In 2004, the company undertook more advanced EN57 modernizations, including electrical system upgrades, control system modifications, and bogie redesigns. On 31 May 2004, the first such modernization was completed for unit EN57-1441 for ZPR Wrocław. In late 2005, Škoda Transportation proposed forming a joint venture to supply trams and EMUs to the Polish market. On 30 April 2006, the company completed the most advanced EN57 modernization to date under the Sectoral Operational Programme Transport, upgrading unit EN57-1417 with new electrical systems, control systems, bogies, interiors, driver's cabs, and streamlined front ends designed by Wojciech Maliński. At that time, the company employed around 700 people. On 19 May 2006, the 60% stake held by Surfinia and Feniks Inwestycje was acquired by the Slovak company Prema Trade, based in Trnava.

In 2007, the company completed two modernizations of EW60 units and nine EN57 modernizations with impulse start systems, which were later discontinued due to unsatisfactory traction performance.

In early 2007, the company's technical department began designing a new three-car EMU, Shirley, in collaboration with Autosan. By mid-2008, the body and bogie frames of the first unit were tested at the Tabor Railway Vehicle Institute in Poznań, with completion planned for later that year. The management expressed interest in producing vehicles for Central and Eastern Europe and discussed building and servicing high-speed rail trains with a Western European manufacturer. At the time, the company employed 1,000 people, including 180 administrative staff and 18 in the technical-design department.

==== Part of Pesa group (from 2008) ====
On 5 July 2008, Prema was established, with Prema Trade contributing its 60% stake in ZNTK. In early August 2008, Pojazdy Szynowe Pesa Bydgoszcz acquired 99.99% of Prema's shares, gaining control of 60% of ZNTK's shares. The remaining 40% was held by the State Treasury and employees, with the company employing 800 people.

On 1 March 2009, due to the economic crisis and reduced orders, the company reduced working hours to four days a week, initially avoiding layoffs, though staff reductions later occurred. The Shirley EMU project was halted.

On 23 October 2009, Pesa acquired an additional 25.31% of shares at a Ministry of State Treasury auction, integrating the company into its corporate group, which ensured stable development and access to new markets.

In 2009, the company began modernizing EN57 units with asynchronous drive systems. In 2011, for an order from the Lublin Voivodeship, it introduced sliding plug doors to these units for the first time. Modernizations continued, with increasing scope, using front ends identical to those in the SPOT program or modified designs by Wojciech Maliński and Maciej Kucharski.

The 2009 economic crisis prompted production diversification. The company expanded into railbus production and tram repairs. In late 2009, a consortium of Pesa and ZNTK won a contract for diesel multiple units for the Lublin Voivodeship, assigned entirely to Mińsk Mazowiecki as a test project for railbus production. In Q1 2010, an unused hall was adapted for railbus production. The company won subsequent tenders, either with Pesa or independently, producing SA135 and SA134 units with simpler, more angular front-end designs compared to Pesa's Bydgoszcz models. In early 2010, the consortium secured its first tram modernization contract for Grudziądz.

In February 2010, the company introduced a strategy to improve its financial health, establishing three internal divisions: repairs, mechanical, and construction. The construction division supplied components, including tram body panels, to Pesa and the other divisions. Between 2011 and 2012, the company repaired passenger cars for PKP Intercity. By mid-2012, with 670 employees, it performed two fifth-level and twelve fourth-level repairs monthly, the highest among Polish repair facilities.

Between late 2012 and early 2013, Andrzej Rudkiewicz, Jakub Rudkiewicz, and Radosław Fafara designed a modernized front end for EN57 modernizations for the Łódź Voivodeship, which was applied to subsequent upgrades. In early March 2014, Pesa's Bydgoszcz locomotive depot was listed as a heritage site, halting its expansion. As a result, Pesa increased employment and expanded the Mińsk Mazowiecki facility, driven by modernization contracts and an order for 20 Dart units for PKP Intercity, to be serviced in Mińsk.

In September 2015, a new hall was completed to service up to three Dart units simultaneously, up to the P4 maintenance level. Acceptance of the facility followed, and by late 2015, the first ED161 unit arrived for staff training, with the company tasked with 15-year maintenance of these EMUs.

Between 2015 and 2016, EN57 modernization costs ranged from 7 to 9 million PLN per unit, depending on the scope and order size, roughly half the cost of a new vehicle with similar capacity. In 2006, SPOT program modernizations cost approximately 1.8 million PLN per unit. In 2017, after debates on the cost-effectiveness of modernizations, most operators and regional authorities announced plans to phase out modernizations in favor of new rolling stock. Robert Świechowicz, Pesa's president, stated that Mińsk Mazowiecki would focus on P4 and P5 maintenance for all Pesa-produced EMUs if EN57 modernizations ended.

In early 2018, the company completed its first modernization of an ED72Ac EMU, with a front end styled after Pesa's Elf II. On 26 February 2019, the company presented the restored EW51-36, Poland's oldest EMU from 1936. In January 2022, it completed the restoration of EN57-038, repainted in its historical yellow-navy livery. On 31 May 2023, the company delivered the last of 14 modernized ED74 units and announced it would focus on maintenance, servicing, and periodic repairs of Gama locomotives.

== Operations ==
=== Railway ===
The company serves both local governments and business partners, offering:

- Production of railbuses.
- Modernization of locomotives, EMUs, passenger cars, and trams.
- Major and revision repairs of railway vehicles and their components.

==== Order summary ====
Vehicle	Quantity	Delivery years	Recipient
Production
SA135 Mińsk	6	2010	Lower Silesian Railways
SA135 Mińsk	5	2010–2011	Marshal's Office of Subcarpathian Voivodeship
SA134 Mińsk 2	5	2010	Marshal's Office of Lublin Voivodeship
SA134 Mińsk 2	2	2011	Marshal's Office of Lubusz Voivodeship
SA134 Mińsk 2	1	2011	Marshal's Office of Subcarpathian Voivodeship
SA134 Mińsk 2	3	2011	Lower Silesian Railways
SA134 Mińsk 2	3	2013	Marshal's Office of Lublin Voivodeship
SA134 Mińsk 2	1	2014	Marshal's Office of Subcarpathian Voivodeship
Modernizations
EN57	42	2006–2007	Przewozy Regionalne
EW60	2	2007	Masovian Railways
EW60	2	2013–2014	Masovian Railways
EN57 km	5	2007	Masovian Railways
EN57AKM	5	2013	Masovian Railways
EN57	4	2007	Szybka Kolej Miejska
EN57AKM	4	2016	Szybka Kolej Miejska
EN71	1	2007	Masovian Railways
EN57	2	2008	SKM Warszawa
EN57AKM	6	2009–2010	Masovian Railways
EN71	1	2010	Masovian Railways
EN71 km	4	2010	Masovian Railways
EN57AKM	3	2010–2011	Marshal's Office of Łódź Voivodeship
EN57AL	5	2011	Marshal's Office of Lublin Voivodeship
ED72A	2	2011	Przewozy Regionalne
EN57AL	1	2011	Marshal's Office of Pomeranian Voivodeship
EN57AL	3	2012	Marshal's Office of Pomeranian Voivodeship
EN57AL	1	2012	Marshal's Office of Lower Silesian Voivodeship
EN57AL	3	2012–2013	Marshal's Office of Podlaskie Voivodeship
EN57AL	4	2012–2013	Marshal's Office of Łódź Voivodeship
ED72A	4	2012–2013	Marshal's Office of Kuyavian–Pomeranian Voivodeship
EN57AL	4	2012–2014	Marshal's Office of Opole Voivodeship
EN57AKM	7	2013–2014	Masovian Railways
EN57AL	7	2013–2014	Marshal's Office of West Pomeranian Voivodeship
EN57AKM	21	2013–2014	Szybka Kolej Miejska
EN57AL	1	2014	Marshal's Office of Lower Silesian Voivodeship
EN57AL	1	2014	Marshal's Office of Podlaskie Voivodeship
EN57AL	4	2014–2015	Marshal's Office of Łódź Voivodeship
EN57AL	27	2014–2015	Masovian Railways
EN57AL	1	2015	Marshal's Office of Lower Silesian Voivodeship
EN57AL	2	2015	Marshal's Office of Podlaskie Voivodeship
EN57AL	21	2015	Przewozy Regionalne
EN57AL	10	2015–2016	Marshal's Office of West Pomeranian Voivodeship
EN57AL	1	2016	Marshal's Office of Pomeranian Voivodeship
EN57AL	39	2016–2017	Masovian Railways
EN57AL	5	2017	Marshal's Office of Greater Poland Voivodeship
EN57ALc	36	2017–2018	Przewozy Regionalne
EN57ALd	36	2017–2018	Przewozy Regionalne
ED72Ac	12	2017–2018	Przewozy Regionalne
EN57ALc	1	2018	Marshal's Office of Warmian–Masurian Voivodeship

=== District heating ===
In April 2008, the company obtained the necessary licenses from the Energy Regulatory Office and in June 2011 began operations in the heating sector. The company produced thermal energy in an on-site boiler plant equipped with two WR-5 boilers and four WLM-2.5 boilers with a total installed capacity of 29.9 MW and an operational capacity of 23.1 MW. It was also responsible for the transmission and distribution of heat, as well as for the maintenance of district heating substations in residential, commercial, public utility, and industrial buildings within Mińsk Mazowiecki.

== Presence at trade fairs ==
=== ZNTK Mińsk Mazowiecki at Trako trade fair ===
Year	Stand	Vehicles	Source
1999	yes	–	
2003	yes	–	
2005	yes	EN57-1920 (presented by Masovian Railways)	
2007	yes	EN57 km-1486 (presented by Masovian Railways), EN57-1094 (presented by SKM Tricity)	
2015	no	EN57AL-2101 (presented by Przewozy Regionalne)	

== Cooperation with education and science ==
From 23 April 2009 to 31 March 2012, ZNTK Mińsk Mazowiecki together with the Tabor Railway Vehicle Institute from Poznań implemented a targeted project titled Electric multiple unit for power supply voltages 3 kV; 15 kV – 16.6 Hz; 25 kV – 50 Hz. The total value of the project was 27,410,000 PLN, of which 5,493,500 PLN was co-financed by the National Centre for Research and Development.

On 23 June 2015, the management of ZNTK Mińsk Mazowiecki signed a letter of intent with the authorities of Mińsk County and the management of Vocational School Complex No. 2 named after the Warsaw Insurgents in Mińsk Mazowiecki, specifying the conditions of cooperation aimed at improving the technical knowledge and skills of the school's graduates and better preparing its students for the labor market requirements.

== Financial results ==
Between 1998 and 2001, the plant incurred losses, although they were decreasing year by year. From 2002 to 2007, ZNTK Mińsk Mazowiecki recorded profits, but from 2008 to 2011 the company returned to losses. Between 2012 and 2022, the enterprise once again achieved positive financial results.

== Company presidents ==
Presidents of the company after its privatization in July 2002:

From	To	Person	Source
November 2002	November 2002	Władysław Nowak	
November 2002	September 2009	Slavomír Mamatej	
September 2009	April 2010	Stanisław Cichoń	
May 2010	November 2010	Ryszard Kędzior	
November 2010	March 2011	Michał Bohuszewicz	
May 2011	March 2013	Krzysztof Adamski	
March 2013	February 2016	Sławomir Piątek	
February 2016	December 2016	Sebastian Kamecki	
December 2016	April 2021	Krzysztof Adamski	
April 2021	Present	Jacek Bilski	

== Awards and honors ==
- 1998 – distinction at the Kolej na kolej '98 exhibition in Karsznice for ecological toilets installed in modernized electric multiple units.
- 1998 – award for the best product at the Trako '98 fair in Gdynia for an automatic passenger information system designed for railway stations.
- 1998 – distinction at the Kolej '98 fair in Bydgoszcz for electromagnetic direction boards installed in modernized electric multiple units.
- 2020 – 25th place in the national ranking and 8th place in the regional ranking for the Masovian Voivodeship in the category of large companies with revenues exceeding 250 million PLN, in the Forbes Diamonds ranking.
