= PKP class EW55 =

Electric multiple units produced by Pafawag in Wrocław

EW55
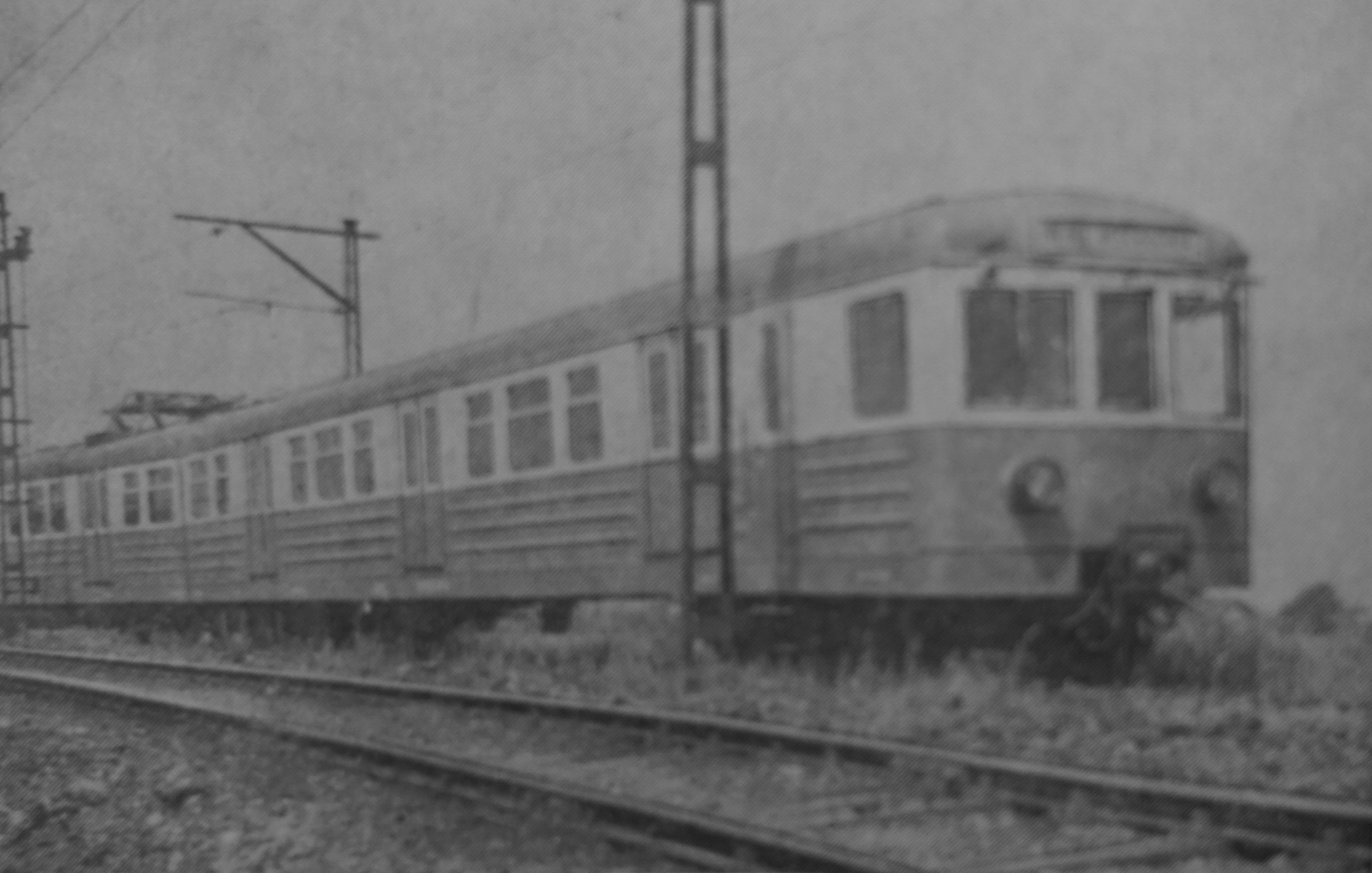
- Stock type: electric multiple unit
- Manufacturer: Pafawag
- Assembly: Wrocław, Poland
- Constructed: 1958–1962
- Number built: 72
- Capacity: 670

Specifications
- Train length: 63,700 mm (209.0 ft)
- Width: 2,920 mm (9.58 ft)
- Height: 3,720 mm (12.20 ft)
- Wheel diameter: drive wheels: 1,000 mm (3.3 ft); rolling wheels: 940 mm (3.08 ft)
- Maximum speed: 110 km/h (68 mph)
- Weight: 123 t (271,000 lb)
- Engine type: LK-450
- Power output: 580 kW
- Braking system(s): Knorr

PKP class EW55 (manufacturer's designation: Pafawag 3B/4B) were standard-gauge, three-car, high-platform electric multiple units produced between 1958 and 1962 in a quantity of 72 units by the Pafawag factory in Wrocław. Starting in 1959, they were directed to Katowice and Warsaw. In 1964, the vehicles ended service in Upper Silesia, and their operation was finally concluded in 1995.

== Origins, design, and production ==
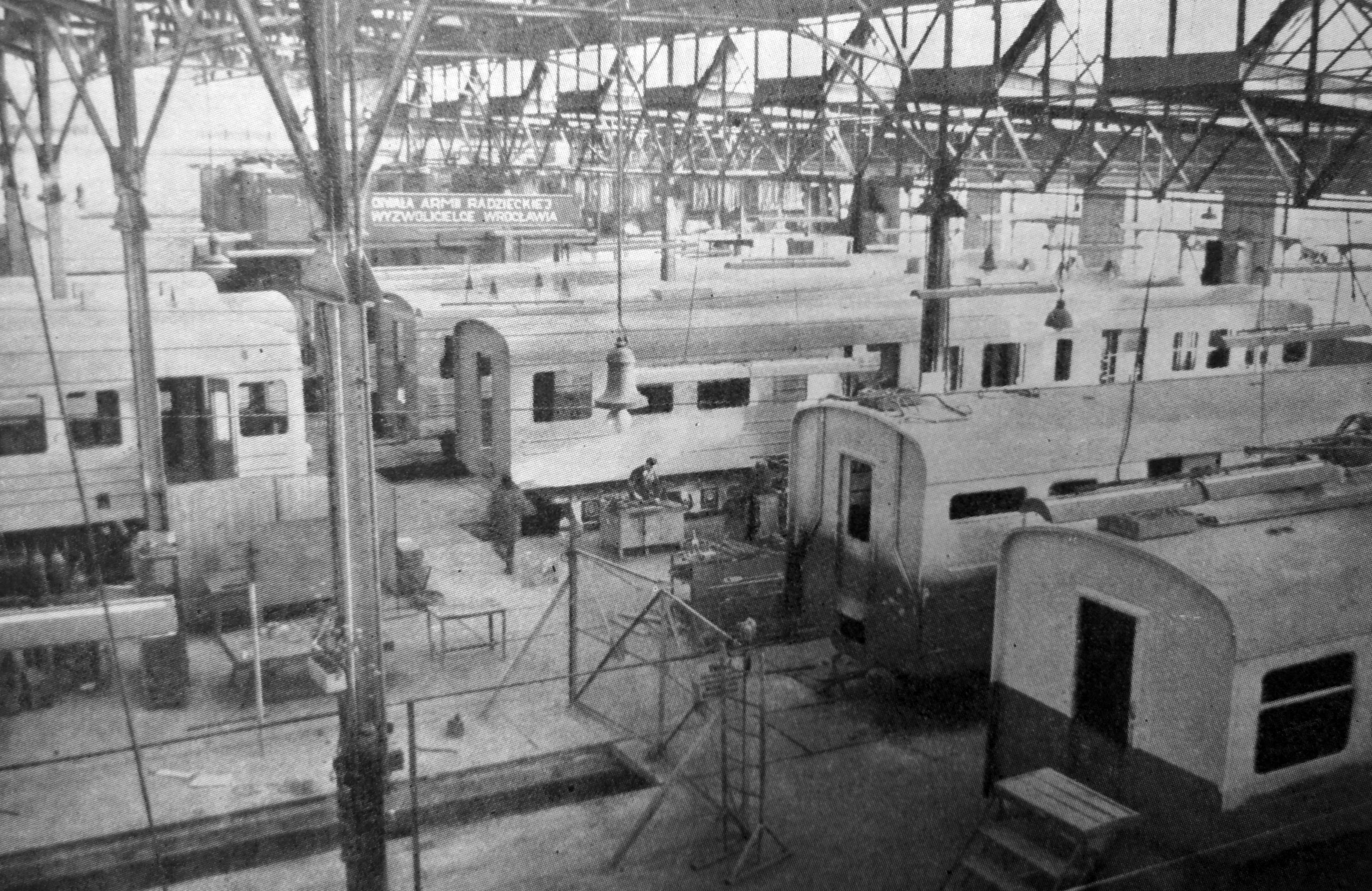
Assembly of EMUs at Pafawag, with two carriages of the 3B/4B unit visible in the lower right corner

Due to the shortage of suburban units in the Warsaw railway junction and the anticipated high demand for such vehicles in the Katowice junction as well, it was decided to develop and manufacture a new electric multiple unit (EMU) in Poland.

In 1952, the Railway Electrification Office, using the operational results of the EW51 and EW54 series units, prepared preliminary design assumptions. In the following years, the parameters and design solutions for individual devices of the new unit were refined, and in 1954, final production assumptions were created, also considering the experience from the EN56 units. In 1956, the Central Design Office of the Railway Equipment Industry completed the technical design of the vehicle, which was given the factory designation 3B/4B. The lead designer responsible for the mechanical part was Sławomir Mossakowski, while the electrical and traction parts were developed by Maciej Dobrowolski. The construction of the unit used achievements from Western technical thought and existing documentation. The Pafawag factory in Wrocław was chosen as the manufacturer of the new vehicles.

The ongoing electrification of Polish railways also required an increasing number of units for local traffic. Therefore, immediately after the development of the high-platform vehicle, work began on a low-platform unit. The 3B/4B type EMU became the prototype for a new unit with the industrial designation 5B/6B.

Production of the 3B/4B type units began in 1958. In January 1959, the prototype unit was completed, and by 1962, Pafawag in Wrocław had delivered a total of 72 EMUs of this type to Polish State Railways. The numbering of subsequent units was two-digit, as it was assumed from the beginning that their number would not exceed 100 units.

Immediately after the production of the 3B/4B type vehicles ended, serial and long-term production of the low-platform EN57 units for regional traffic began. These were a design development of the high-platform units and were equipped with almost identical components.

== Construction ==
=== Carbody ===
The electric multiple units (EMUs) of the EW55 series consisted of three carriages: two control cars and one railcar. The control cars (factory designation 3B) were the end cars, labeled as ra and rb (control car a and b) on the Polish State Railways, while the railcar (factory designation 4B) was in the middle and labeled s. The cars were connected using a so-called short "factory" coupler (without a head, non-detachable in operational conditions) and a passenger passageway. On the ends of the control cars (at the beginning and end of the unit), so-called long couplers (automatic Scharfenberg couplers) were installed, allowing the units to be connected into trains. The EW55 units were designed to operate in multiple units with other units of the same series, but there was no possibility of passenger passage between connected units.

Each car's underframe was constructed from rolled and pressed or bent steel sheets, forming a series of longitudinal beams known as stringers or main girders and transverse beams known as crossbeams. The entire construction was welded. The end beams and twist beams, which were critical areas in the underframe, were designed as box constructions to ensure high strength.

The windows in the side walls of the passenger compartments were two-part, with widths of 750 and 1,100 mm. The lower part was fixed in the window frame using rubber gaskets, while the upper part was set in an aluminum frame and could be tilted inward. The front windows in the driver's cabs were fixed in frames using rubber gaskets. The side windows in the driver's cabs were 750 mm wide and fully retractable. All window panes were made of tempered glass.

=== Interior and passenger space ===
Each of the three cars in the EW55 unit had four compartments with a central aisle between the seats, accessible to passengers and separated by three vestibules. Each vestibule had a pair of automatically sliding, pneumatically operated doors, 1,300 mm wide. The end compartments of the control cars were the conductor's compartments, with 8 seats and manually operated single-leaf external doors on each side of the train.

The seats were designed as hard benches, 900 mm long, with a seat depth of 450 mm, seat height from the floor of 440 mm, and backrest height from the floor of 985 mm; each bench weighed 40.7 kg.

Electric heating radiators with a total power of 67.2 kW were placed under the benches in the passenger compartments, either singly or in pairs.

Luggage racks in the passenger compartments were installed along the side walls above the windows. The ceiling had two parallel rows of fluorescent lighting, each with 25 W fluorescent tubes without covers.

=== Rolling chassis ===
Each end car was supported by two bogies with a wheelbase of 2,700 mm and an axle diameter of 160 mm. The wheels of the trailing bogies were made of St65P steel, with a diameter of 940 mm, a width of 135 mm, and a thickness of 65 mm when new (30 mm when worn).

The central railcar was supported by two driving bogies with a wheelbase of 2,700 mm and axle diameters of 170 mm and 175 mm. The wheels of the driving bogies were made of 70P steel, with a diameter of 1,000 mm, a width of 135 mm, and a thickness of 75 mm when new (35 mm when worn).

The bogies of the EW55 series vehicles were equipped with tyred wheelsets, hydraulic shock absorbers, leaf springs, and coil springs. The pivot spacing in all cars was 14,800 mm.

The rolling chassis of the railcar housed all the electrical and pneumatic equipment.

=== Power supply and drive ===
Direct current at 3,000 V, supplied through an overhead line, was collected by two symmetrical current collectors of type AKP-1 or AKP-4E, mounted on the roof of the central railcar. This current powered 4 traction motors located in the driving bogies of the central car. The torque of each traction motor was transmitted to the driving wheelset via a single-sided gear train consisting of a small and a large gear wheel.

== Operation ==
Country	Operator	Number of units	Designation	Years of operation	Sources
Poland	Polish State Railways	72	E55-01 to 72 (until 1959) EW55-01 to 72 (from 1959)	1959–1995	

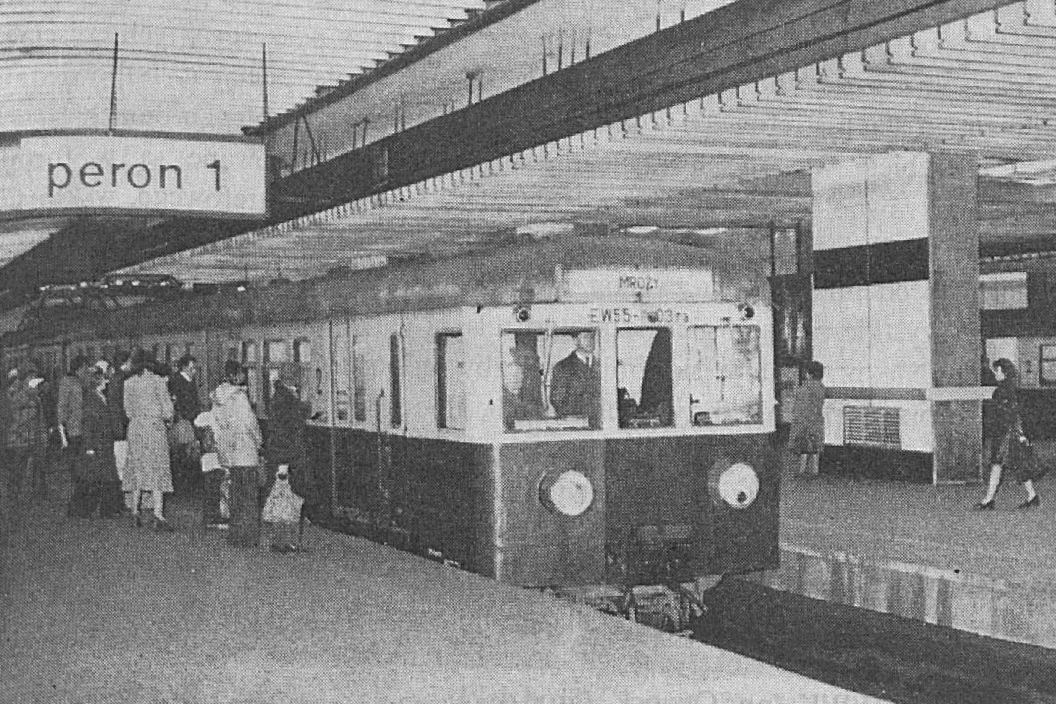
EW55-03 at the Warszawa Śródmieście railway station

Initially designated as the E55 series, the 3B/4B type EMUs were reclassified to EW55 in mid-1959. These units were first assigned to the Warszawa Grochów, Warszawa Ochota, and Katowice maintenance depots. They ended their service in Upper Silesia in 1964, and by 1969, all units had been transferred to the Warszawa Ochota depot. Throughout the 1970s and 1980s, during repairs and inspections, these units were equipped with a third headlight and destination sign covers, similar to those used on the EN57 series vehicles.

By the end of the first half of 1982, there were 68 units of the EW55 series in the inventory of the Central Directorate of District State Railways. In October 1990, 66 EW55 units were stationed at the Warszawa Ochota depot. During the 1990s, these vehicles began to be decommissioned, and their operation officially ended in the spring of 1995. Units numbered 01, 47, and 50 were kept for museum purposes, with unit 50 being the last to be decommissioned. However, due to a lack of final decisions, these vehicles were eventually scrapped. Additionally, units numbered 33, 35, and 38 were preserved at the Pesa Mińsk Mazowiecki company and transported to the Ochota depot in July 1999. Polish State Railways initially decided to dismantle these units at the Ochota depot, but later that same month, they were transferred to a scrap yard in Pruszków. Despite efforts by railway enthusiasts to preserve at least one of these vehicles as a historical monument, no positive decision was made, and the units were scrapped by the end of 1999.

== Bibliography ==
- Domański, Emilian; Kowalczyk, Edward; Skoniecki, Janusz (1974). Elektryczne zespoły trakcyjne serii EW55 i EN57 (in Polish) (2 ed.). Warsaw: Wydawnictwa Komunikacji i Łączności.
- Kroma, Robert; Sosiński, Janusz; Zintel, Krzysztof (2012). Normalnotorowe wagony silnikowe PKP 1945–1990. Encyklopedia taboru (in Polish) (1 ed.). Poznań: BWH Kolpress. ISBN 978-83-933257-3-3.
