= Communist Party of Poland (1965–1996) =

Polish Anti-Revisionist Communist Party

Communist Party of Poland Komunistyczna Partia Polski
- Abbreviation: KPP (Mijal)
- Leader: Kazimierz Mijal
- Founded: 4 December 1965
- Split from: PZPR
- Ideology: Communism; Marxism–Leninism; Mao Zedong Thought; Anti-revisionism
- Political position: Far-left
- Colours: Red
- Ceased operations: 1983

The Communist Party of Poland (sometimes called Marxist–Leninist) was an illegal anti-revisionist Marxist–Leninist communist party founded on 1965 in-exile in Albania by Kazimierz Mijal. It was opposed to the Polish United Workers' Party, specifically its leader Władysław Gomułka. It upheld Joseph Stalin against Nikita Khrushchev's criticisms at the 20th Party Congress, instead favoring Maoism and a more hardline stance against the Catholic clergy, which was opposed by Gomułka. Mijal himself opposed Gomułka as a member of the Natolinian faction of the PZPR. Mijal declared himself Secretary General of the "Temporary Central Committee of the Communist Party of Poland" and took control of Radio Tirana's Polish wing. Mijal's party failed to achieve a noticeable foothold in Polish political life, despite accruing a small number of supporters. The party's rank-and-file was almost exclusively centered in the port city of Gdańsk, where minor inroads were in made recruiting members amongst dockworkers. The Party was supported by China, which helped smuggle pamphlets in Poland, and also had support from the Belgian Maoist La voix du peuple (The Voice of the People), which helped in pamphleteering. Among other prominent members were other Polish communists removed by Gomułka from positions of power such as Hilary Chełchowski and Władysław Dworakowski.

With the Sino-Albanian split in 1978, Mijal had a conflict with Enver Hoxha and moved to China in 1978. In 1983 he returned illegally to Poland and started criticizing the Jaruzelski regime. Since its inception, the Polish government claimed the Polish Communist Party was a puppet of the Chinese Communist Party and had no support in Poland. The party for all practical purposes if not in intent ceased existence after his return.

== See also ==
- List of anti-revisionist groups
