= Władysław Dworakowski =

Polish politician (1908–1976)

Chairman of the Committee for Public Security at the Council of Ministers
- In office 14 December 1954 – 30 March 1956
- Preceded by: Position established
- Succeeded by: Edmund Pszczółkowski

Deputy Prime Minister of the Republic of Poland
- In office 21 November 1952 – 18 March 1954
- Prime Minister: Bolesław Bierut

Personal details
- Born: 10 October 1908 Oblasy, Congress Poland, Russian Empire (now Poland)
- Died: 17 October 1976 (aged 68) Warsaw, Polish People's Republic
- Party: KPP; PPR; PZPR
- Other political affiliations: Communist Party of Poland (Mijal)

Władysław Dworakowski (10 September 1908 – 17 November 1976) was a Polish communist politician and statesman.

== Biography ==
Dworakowski was born in to a poor peasant family in the Lublin Governorate. He was a locksmith by profession and was active in the workers's movement. Dworakowski joined the Young Communist League of Poland in 1931 and later the Communist Party of Poland in 1934 and was a member of the party until its dissolution in 1938.

In 1941-1942 he was a member of the Association of Friends of the Soviet Union and later joined the Polish Workers' Party (PPR) shortly after its foundation. He was member of the anti-Nazi resistance in Poland and was a soldier in Gwardia Ludowa and also participated in the Warsaw Uprising.

After World War II he was a high ranking functionary in the PPR and later the Polish United Workers' Party (PZPR). He was the secretary of the Central Committee and the Party District Committees in Gdańsk, Warsaw and Łódź. From November 1952 to March 1954 Dworakowski was Deputy Prime Minister of the People's Republic of Poland in the government of Bolesław Bierut. At the Second Party Congress in 1954, he became a member of the Politburo of the Central Committee and at the same time Secretary of the Central Committee of the PZPR.

In 1951 Dworakowski expressed condemnation of Władysław Gomułka's "polonization policy", which disregarded communist doctrines, and accused Gomułka: "Full of hatred for the Soviet Union, Gomułka led an action through which our working masses were to be won over to the bourgeoisie and the large bourgeois landowners". He was among the people responsible Gomułka's arrest.

In December 1954 the Ministry of Public Security was disbanded and its functions were divided in to two different committees and Dworakowski became the chairman of Committee for Public Security (KdsBP).

After the Polish October, Dworakowski was one of the politicians who were against the Gomułka reforms and eventually created the Natolinian faction alongside other party hardliners. Eventually the Natolins lost the power struggle within the PZPR, and Dworakowski who was one of the most outspoken members of the faction was significantly demoted within the party and lost his membership in the Politburo in 1956.

In 1959, Dworakowski left the party and returned to his profession as a locksmith. Later he joined Kazimierz Mijal's Communist Party of Poland and was involved in underground activity for the party.

Władysław Dworakowski died in 1971 at the age of 68 and despite his stance against the PZPR received a state funeral. He was buried at the Powązki Military Cemetery.
