= Hilary Chełchowski =

Polish carpenter and communist politician

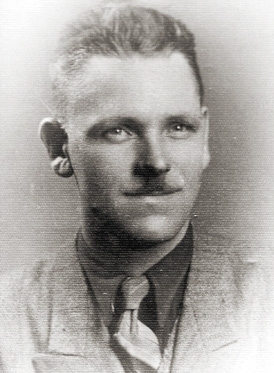

Deputy Prime Minister of the Polish People's Republic
- In office 1950–1952

Personal details
- Born: 10 January 1908 Mosaki-Stara Wieś, Congress Poland (today Poland)
- Died: 10 December 1983 (aged 75) Warsaw, Poland
- Resting place: Northern Communal Cemetery
- Party: Polish United Worker's Party
- Other political affiliations: Communist Party of Poland (1965–1996)

Hilary Chełchowski (10 January 1908 – 10 December 1983) was a Polish carpenter and communist politician. Vice-president of the Council of Ministers (1950–1952), Minister of State Agricultural Farms (1951–1954) and member of the State Council (1955–1957), member of the State National Council and the Legislative Sejm and the Sejm of the People's Republic of Poland of the first convocation.

== Biography ==
He was born into a small-noble family of Feliks, heir to part of the village of Mosaki-Stara Wieś, and Marianna née Milewski. At the age of two orphaned by his father. He received primary education. He worked in the 1930s as a laborer in Warsaw, from 1932 a member of the Communist Party of Poland.

During World War II he joined the Gwardia Ludowa and the Armia Ludowa, he used the pseudonym Długi Janek. From 1942 a member of the Polish Workers' Party, in 1943 he was secretary of the party's Lublin district, then (in the same year) of the Radom district. In the years 1943–1948 a member of the Central Committee of the Polish Workers' Party, in the years 1944–1945 secretary of the Radom-Kielce district, in the years 1945–1948 head of the Agricultural Department of the Central Committee, in the years 1945–1948 a member of the Secretariat of the Central Committee, in 1948 a deputy member of the Politburo of the Central Committee of the Polish Workers' Party and a member Organizational Office of the Central Committee.

From 1948, a member of the Polish United Workers' Party, he continued to belong to the leadership of the party and held the following functions: member of the Central Committee (1948–1959), deputy member of the Politburo of the Central Committee (1948–1956), member of the Organizational Bureau of the Central Committee (1948–1954), deputy member of the Central Committee (1959–1964), head of the Agricultural Department of the Central Committee (1948–1950).

In the years 1950–1952 deputy prime minister, in the years 1951–1954 the minister of state farms, in the period 14.12.1954–18.12.1956 chairman of the Presidium of the Voivodeship National Council in Wrocław, in 1955–1957, a member of State Council. On October 5, 1956, at the plenum of the Provincial Committee of the Polish United Workers' Party (Wrocław Voivodeship), he delivered a paper that became a pretext for attacks from the press and youth organizations (Polish Socialist Youth Union), which resulted in being removed from important state and party functions. He took the position of the government plenipotentiary for the deployment and employment in agriculture of repatriates returning from the USSR.

In the years 1945–1956, he was a member of the State National Council, Legislative Sejm and the Sejm of the People's Republic of Poland of the first term, he headed parliamentary committees for agriculture (1947-1948 – Agricultural Committee, 1948–1949 – Agriculture and Forestry Committee, 1949–1950 – Agriculture and Agricultural Reforms).

Considered an influential figure among the Natolin faction during the struggle for power in the leadership of the Polish United Workers' Party in the 1950s. An active member of the illegal Communist Party of Poland, established by Kazimierz Mijal. On September 30, 1974, he returned his PZPR membership card to the primary party cell in Warszawa-Mokotów and retired.

He was married to Zofia née Makowski (1910–1999). He died in Warsaw and was buried at the Northern Communal Cemetery in Wólka Węglowa.
