= Committee for Public Security (Poland) =

Secret police agency of Communist Poland (1954–1956)

- Komitet do spraw Bezpieczeństwa Publicznego
- Coat of Arms of the Polish People's Republic used by the agency as its official logo

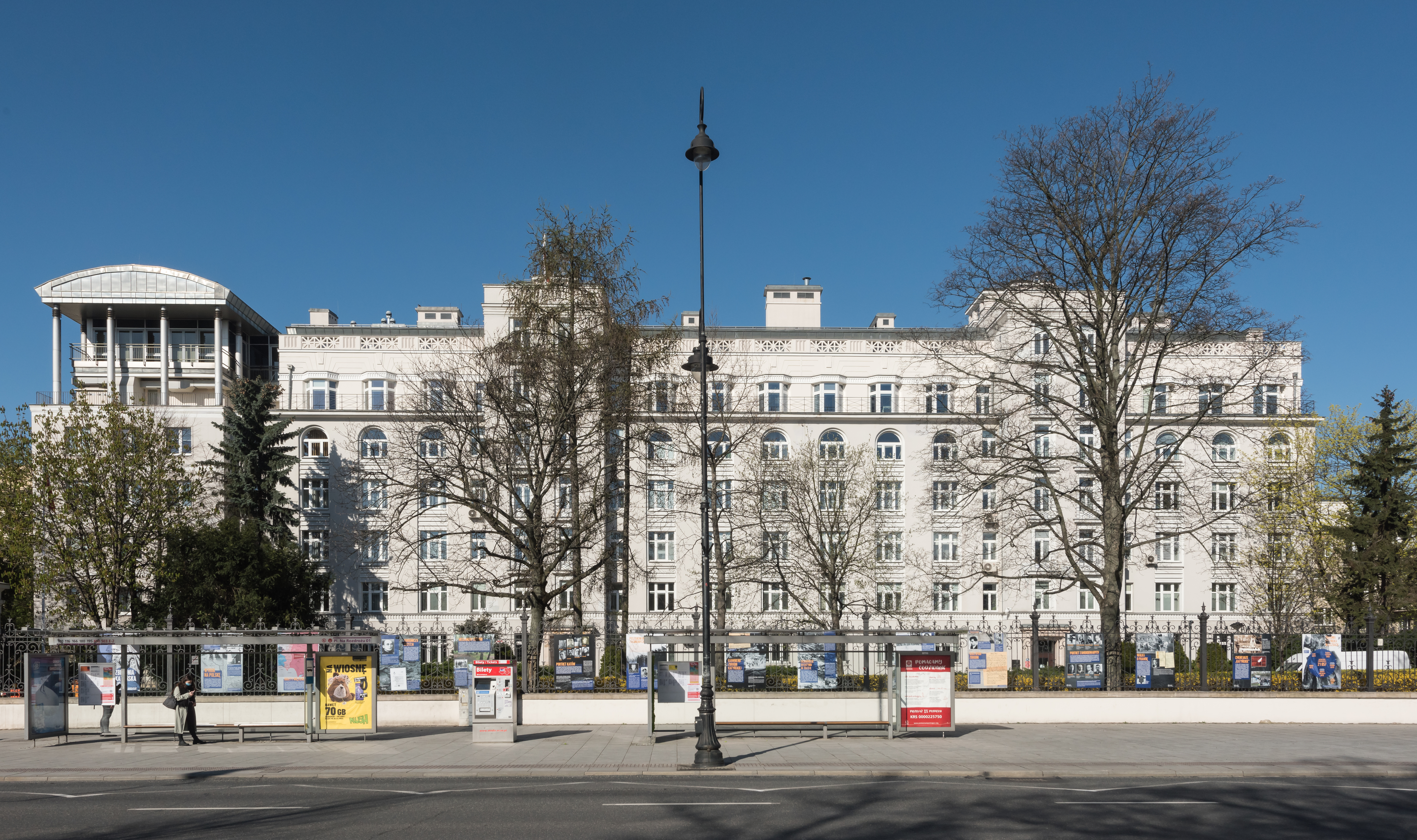
- The agency's headquarters in Ujazdów Avenue

Agency overview
- Formed: 1954
- Preceding agency: Ministry of Public Security
- Dissolved: 1956
- Superseding agency: Security Service
- Type: Secret police, Internal Security Corps special purpose military formation also known as interior troops, foreign intelligence, Counterintelligence, border security, criminal investigations
- Jurisdiction: Poland
- Headquarters: Warsaw, Polish People's Republic
- Agency executives: Władysław Dworakowski (1954–1956); Edmund Pszczółkowski (1956)
- Parent agency: Council of Ministers

The Committee for Public Security at the Council of Ministers (Polish: Komitet do spraw Bezpieczeństwa Publicznego) known in its acronym KdsBP, was collegial supreme body of the state administration of the Polish People's Republic, operating in the years 1954–1956, acting as a special service (comprising intelligence, counterintelligence and political police, and in the years 1955–1956 also military counterintelligence). The name of the institution and its formula was a copy of the name and formula of the KGB USSR, (acronym of Committee for State Security under the Council of Ministers of the Soviet Union. According to the lustration law, the KdsBP is considered a state security body.

== History ==
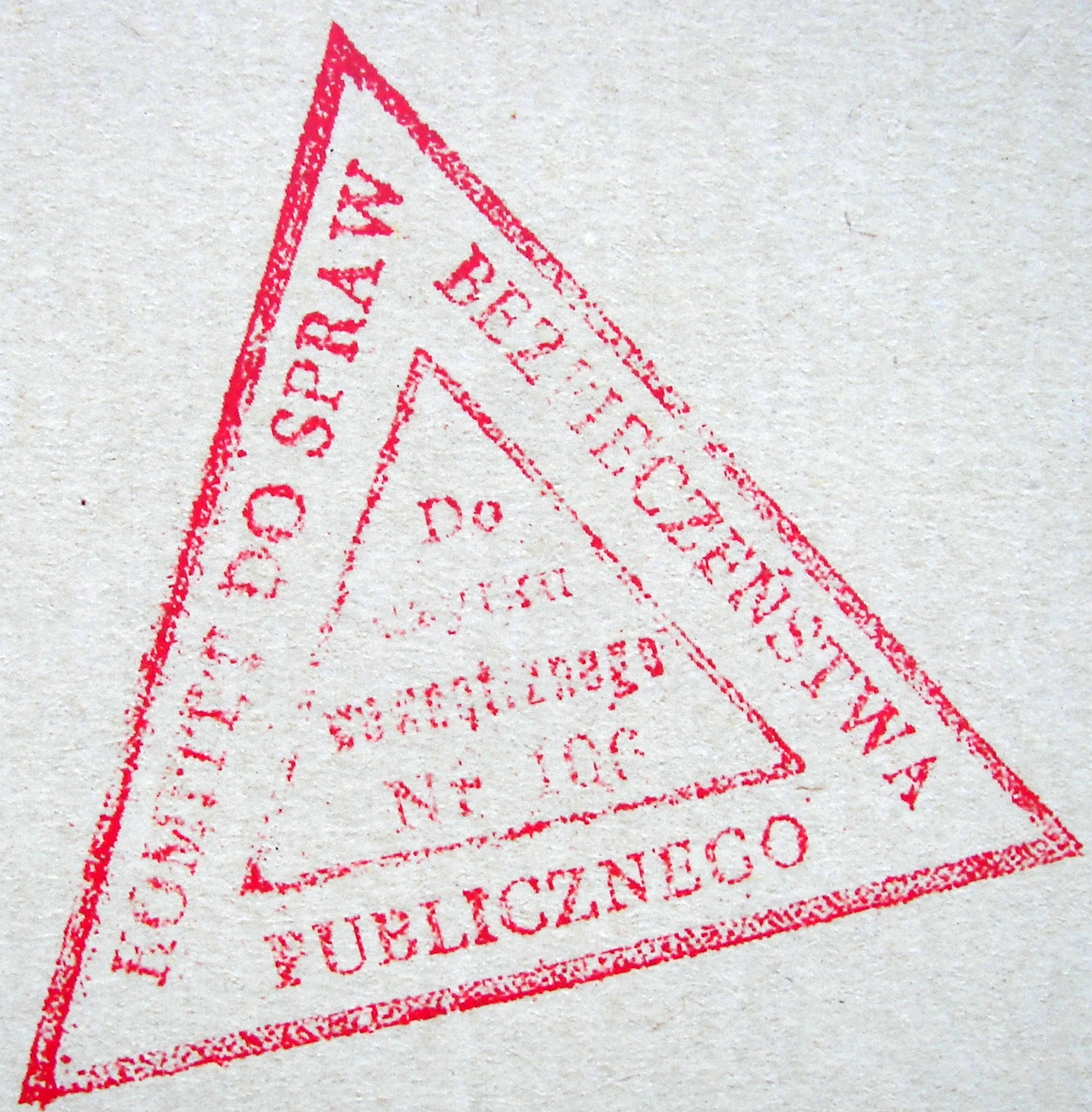
Stamp of the Committee for Public Security

After the escape to the West of Lieutenant Colonel Józef Światło b. (Izaak Fleischfarb) former deputy director of Department X of the Ministry of Public Security, and after the disclosure in Radio Free Europe broadcasts of his memoirs from his service in the Ministry of Public Security, the then communist authorities – wanting to change the image of an institution hated by society and the entire repressive system – began its reorganization. On December 14, 1954, by decree of the Council of State, the Ministry of Public Security was dissolved. The previous Minister of Public Security, Maj. Gen. Stanisław Radkiewicz, was transferred to the position of Minister for State Agricultural Farms. In place of the dissolved MBP, two separate central offices were established to deal with internal and external security: the Ministry of Internal Affairs and the Committee for Public Security. Propaganda publicized these events, although the changes were in reality cosmetic. The competences of the MBP were taken over by the KdsBP, headed by Władysław Dworakowski. All operational, technical-operational and accounting departments of the MBP remained in the committee. It therefore maintained full surveillance and repression capabilities. Several people were removed from prominent positions, but the personal continuity of the MBP-KdsBP management was maintained. The number of employees of the Committee for Public Security was cut by 30% in central headquarters and by 40–50% in local structures. The huge network of secret informers was also substantially reduced and the most implicated functionaries of the Ministry of Public Security were arrested. Surveillance and repressive activities were reduced; in the majority of factories, special cells of public security, set up to spy on workers, were secretly closed.

The Committee for Public Security took responsibility for intelligence and counter-espionage, government security and the secret police. From September 3, 1955 to November 28, 1956 it also controlled the Polish Army's Main Directorate of Information (Główny Zarząd Informacji Wojska), which ran the Military Police and counter espionage service.

== Tasks ==
The formal scope of the KdsBP's activities was defined by the resolution of the Council of Ministers No. 830 of December 7, 1954:

- Fighting against the activities of foreign intelligence conducted by capitalist states and intelligence services of reactionary emigration groups associated with them
- Fighting against the hostile activities of the remnants of the reactionary underground and attempts to create illegal organizations, their political and terrorist activities
- Fighting against the hostile activities of German revisionist elements
- Fighting against sabotage, sabotage, and damage conducted by the enemy in the national economy
- Conducting intelligence against the activities of intelligence services of capitalist states and associated centers of reactionary emigration *Operating against the Polish People's Republic, as well as conducting activities to obtain necessary information in the political, economic, and scientific-technical fields.

== Organization ==
In addition to the massively expanded headquarters in Warsaw, the KdsBP took over an extensive network of local units scattered throughout the country from the MBP – provincial, municipal (in cities separated from provinces), county and commune (three posts at a MO station) Public Security Offices, protection departments ("RO") and military departments ("RW"). After the KdsBP was established, they became its delegations. The basic organizational unit in the MBP, and later in the Committee for Public Security, were departments, which included divisions, divided in turn into sections. In the provincial delegations, the equivalents of departments were divisions consisting of several sections, while the county delegations were divided into departments (sections). After the division of the MBP into the MSW and the KdsBP, the Committee's forces were significantly reduced, but they allowed for well-organized and dynamic activity of the political police.

== Chairman ==
- Władysław Dworakowski (10 December 1954 – 29 March 1956)
- Edmund Pszczółkowski (30 March 1956 – 13 November 1956)
