= Roman Piotrowski =

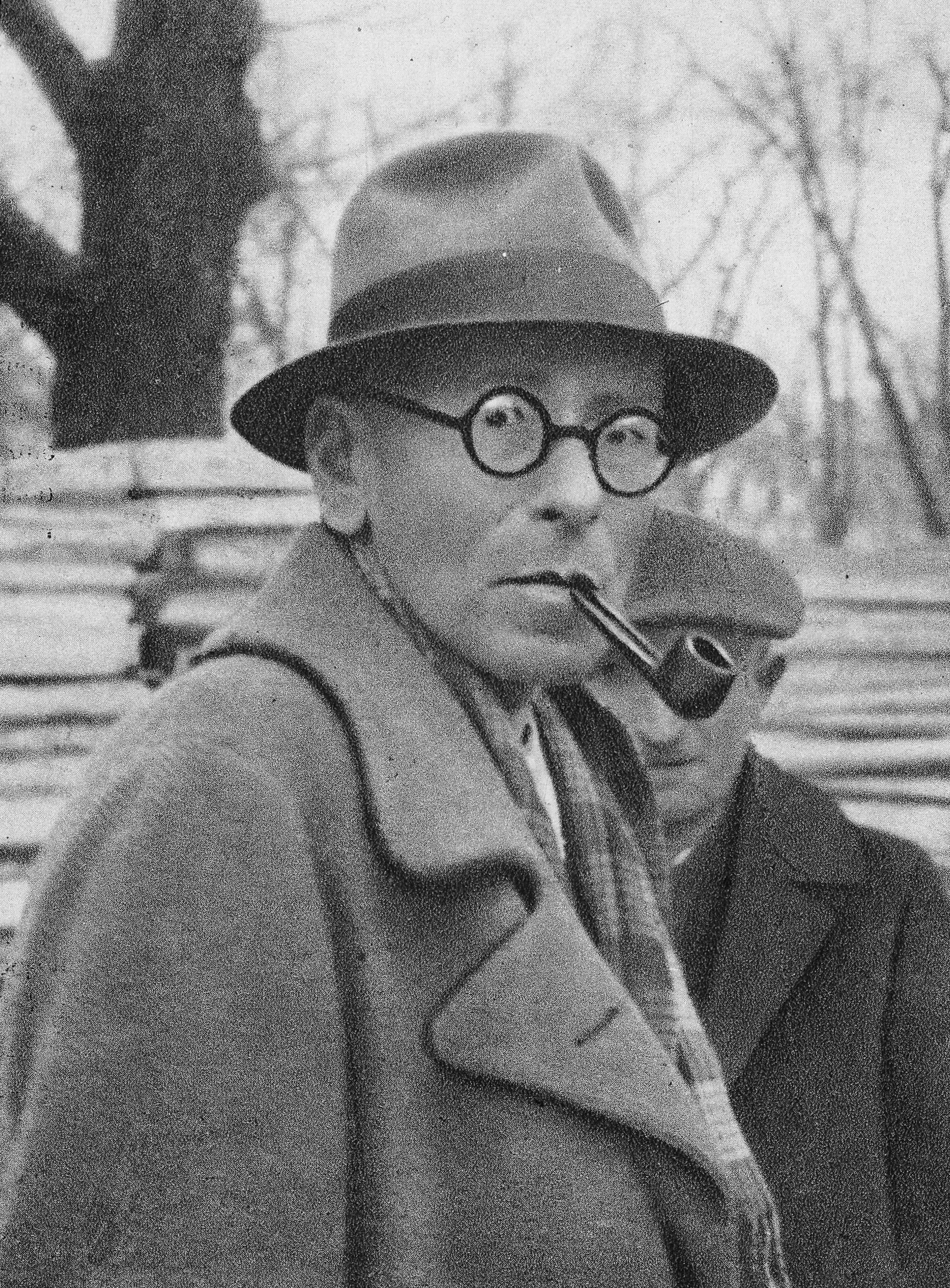

Minister of City Construction
- In office 1951–1951

Personal details
- Born: 21 January 1895 Nowy Targ, Habsburg monarchy
- Died: 19 August 1977 (aged 82) Warsaw, Polish People's Republic
- Resting place: Powązki Military Cemetery
- Citizenship: Poland
- Party: Polish United Worker's Party
- Education: Lviv Polytechnic
- Awards: Order of the Builders of People's Poland, Order of the Cross of Grunwald, Medal for Warsaw 1939–1945

Roman Piotrowski (January 21, 1895 – December 17, 1988) was a Polish architect and politician. He served as a member of the State National Council, Legislative Sejm and the Sejm of the Polish People's Republic of the 1st term, in the years 1951–1956 as well as Minister of Town and Estate Construction in the Cabinet of Bolesław Bierut and Józef Cyrankiewicz.

== Biography ==
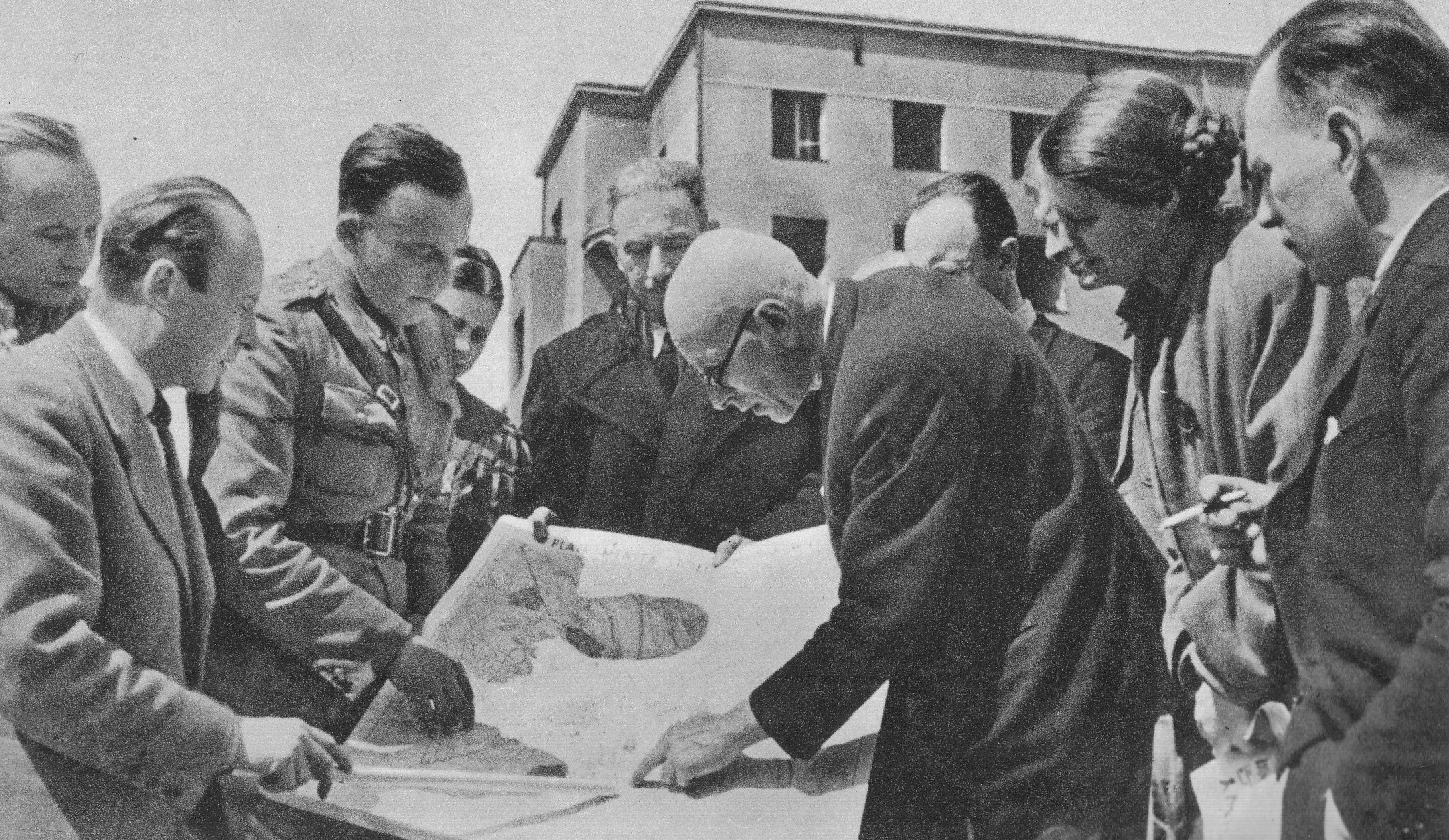
Roman Piotrowski (in the middle, leaning over the map) with colleagues from the Capital Reconstruction Office (1945)

He studied architecture at the Lviv Polytechnic, then at the Warsaw Polytechnic, graduated in 1924, and in the years 1921–1935 he was an assistant at the Institute of Architecture of the University of Warsaw. He was associated with the Praesens group.

In the years 1930–1933 he was an engineer-architect of the "Budozus" company and co-designer of the ZUS single-family housing estate in Żoliborz (1935). In the years 1934–1944 he was the technical director of the Society of Workers' Housing Estates (TOR). He was a member of the team that designed the TOR housing estate built between Obozowa and Bolecha streets in Koło.

During World War II, he was the technical manager of the Social Construction Company operating at the Warsaw Housing Cooperative (WSM). He participated in the work of the Architectural and Urban Planning Studio (PAU) established at WSM in 1940. From 1945 to 1949, he was the head of the Capital Reconstruction Office, and in the years 1945–1947 he was also the vice-president of the capital city of Warsaw. In the period 1947–1949, he held the office of commissioner for the reconstruction of Warsaw at the Minister of Reconstruction.

In 1945, he joined the Polish Workers' Party, and from 1948 he was a member of the Polish United Workers' Party. From 1948, deputy minister of the Ministry of Reconstruction, then from 1949 undersecretary of state, and then head of the Ministry of Construction. From 11 January 1951 to 11 July 1956 he served as Minister of Town and Estate Construction in Cabinet of Bolesław Bierut and Józef Cyrankiewicz, then in 1956 deputy minister and undersecretary of state of the Ministry of Construction. He held a mandate of a member of parliament to the State National Council, the Legislative Sejm and the Sejm of the Polish People's Republic of the 1st term.

From 1956 to 1961 he was the ambassador of the Polish People's Republic to East Germany. On 23 August 1980, he joined the appeal of 64 scholars, writers and publicists to the communist authorities to start a dialogue with striking workers.

He is buried at the Powązki Military Cemetery in Warsaw (section C39-9-6).
