= Wilków Pierwszy =

- Village
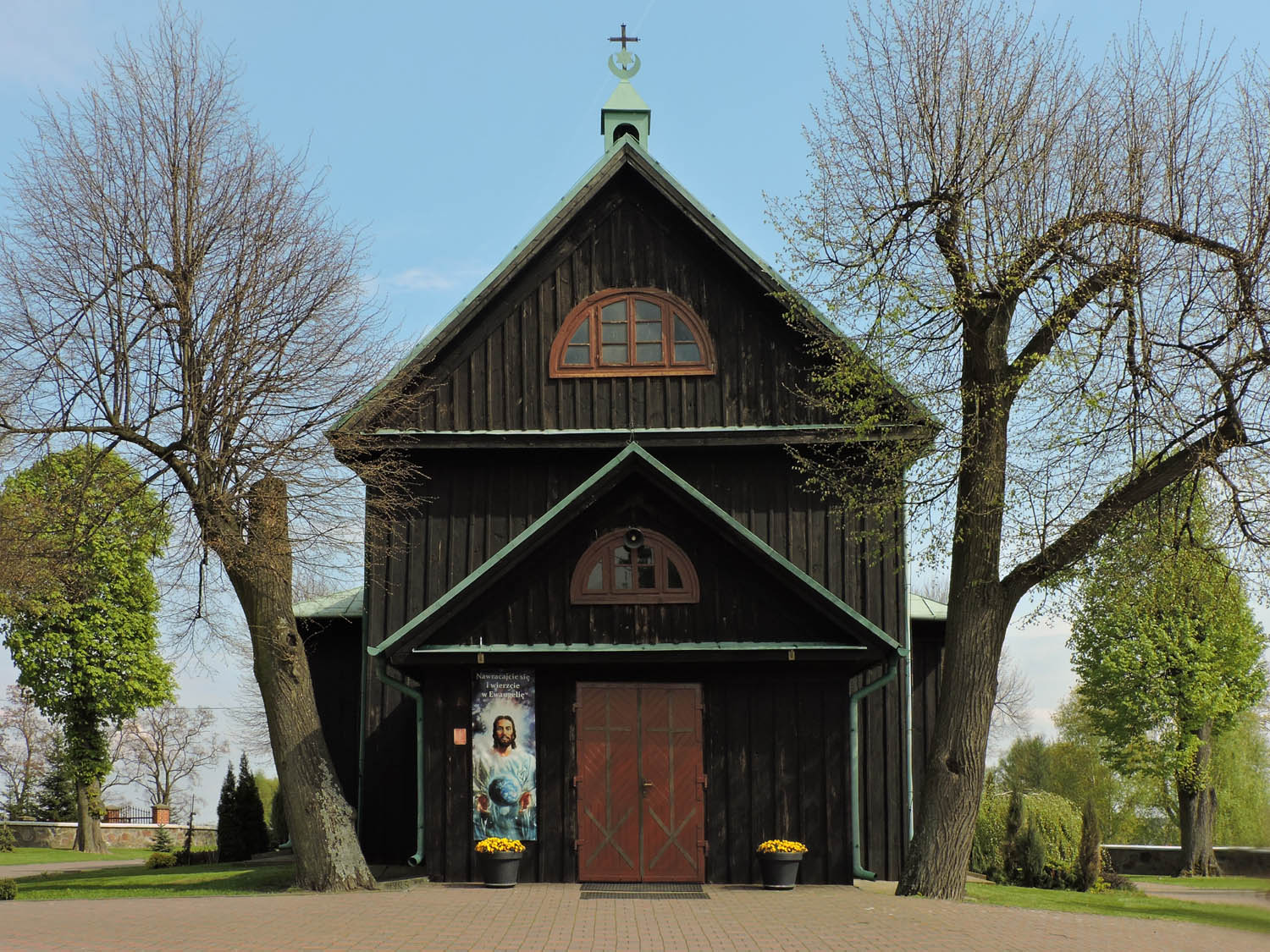
- Church of Saint Lawrence

- Location within Poland
- Coordinates: 51°48′2″N 20°37′13″E
- Country: Poland
- Voivodeship: Masovian
- County: Grójec
- Gmina: Błędów
- Elevation: 174 m (571 ft)

Population
  - Total: 550

Wilków Pierwszy ([ˈvilkuf ˈpjɛrfʂɨ]) is a village of the administrative district of Gmina Błędów, within Grójec County, Masovian Voivodeship, in east-central Poland.
