= Henryk Świątkowski =

Polish lawyer and Minister of Justice

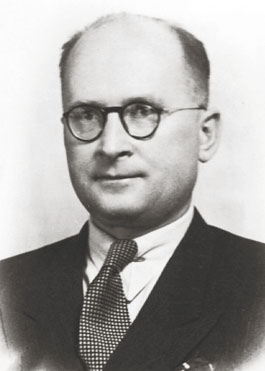

Minister of Justice of the Polish People's Republic
- In office 1945–1956
- Preceded by: Edmund Zalewski
- Succeeded by: Zofia Wasilkowska

Personal details
- Born: 2 April 1896 Dzierzążnia, Congress Poland (today Poland)
- Died: 2 March 1970 (aged 73) Warsaw, Poland
- Resting place: Powązki Military Cemetery
- Party: Polish United Workers' Party
- Other political affiliations: Polish Socialist Party
- Education: University of Warsaw
- Occupation: Lawyer

Henryk Świątkowski (2 April 1896 – 22 March 1970) was a Polish lawyer, attorney and a politician, specialist in the field of religious and agricultural law, academic teacher at the University of Warsaw, member of the Sejm of the Second Republic of Poland of the second and third term, to the National Council and the Sejm of the People's Republic of Poland of the first term. activist of the PPS and PZPR, Voivode of Pomeranian Voivodeship, Minister of Justice in the years 1945–1956, chairman of the Main Board of the Polish–Soviet Friendship Society in the period 1945–1950.

== Biography ==
He was the son of Leokadia Świątkowska and an unknown father. From 1907, he studied at the gymnasium in Płońsk, where he also passed the matriculation examination. As a junior high school student, he participated in a secret self-education club and led an illegal scouting organization. In the fall of 1915, he entered the newly opened University of Warsaw and studied law and political science. For some time he was active in the Polish Military Organization and in the organization of academic youth of the Polish People's Party "Wyzwolenie".

=== Interwar period ===
In 1918 he completed a course for administrative officials of the Society of Courses of the Free Polish University in Warsaw. After graduation, he was a junior trainee at the District Court in Warsaw (1921–1922). After passing the judge's exam, he worked as a trainee attorney, first in Warsaw and then in Zamość, in the office of attorney Piotr Zubowicz, peasant activist and senator on behalf of PSL "Wyzwolenie" (1923–1925). Then he was a lawyer in Zamość (1925–1934) and in Warsaw (1934–1939). He specialized in issues of legal protection of smallholders, small tenants of agricultural land and farm workers.

He was also active in political matters. In 1923, he defended 37 communists accused of participating in the so-called Zamość Uprising in 1918. In 1926, together with attorney Teodor Duracz and several other legal defenders, he successfully led a protest against the resolution of the Bar Council in Lublin prohibiting attorneys from accepting defense in communist cases. In 1937 he was a legal defender in the "Forty Trial" of united-front communist youth activists in Lublin.

From 1923, he was active in the Polish Socialist Party, joining, among others, in the years 1931–1934 he was a member of the Supreme Council of the PPS. He was also a member of the Main Board of the Society of the Workers' University. In the 1930s, he advocated cooperation with the communists in the fight against the growing threat of fascism.

In 1928 and 1930, he was elected as a deputy to the Sejm of the Second Republic of Poland of the second and third term from the PPS list in the constituency covering the districts of Zamość, Biłgoraj and Tomaszów. In 1934, he was a co-organizer of the list of communists and socialists under the name "Blok Robotniczo-Peasant" in the elections to the City Council in Zamość. In July 1938, he joined the City Council of the capital city of Warsaw from the PPS list.

Świątkowski was also an activist in the freethinking movement. He was one of the co-founders of the Association for the Defense of Freedom of Conscience in Poland and the monthly magazine "Wolność Conscience". He combined his professional and political activities with scientific work. He was the author of monographs on religious law and articles published, among others, in "Gazeta Sądowa Warszawskiej", "Głos Sądownictwa", "Głos Praw", and "Freedom of Conscience".

=== German occupation ===
After the German invasion of Poland in September 1939, he remained in Warsaw. He worked as a legal adviser in the Housing Cooperative "Domy Spółdzielcze". On 12 July 1940 he was arrested by the Gestapo and imprisoned in the Pawiak prison, and on 15 August that year he was transported to the Auschwitz-Birkenau concentration camp, where he remained until 8 October 1941, when he was unexpectedly released. He then returned to Warsaw and suffered from tuberculosis for over a year and a half. In the years 1943–1944 he taught religious law at the Higher Bible School of the Methodist Church in the General Government.

Then he joined the underground work in the ranks of the Party of Polish Socialists, which he joined from the Polish Socialist Party. From May 1944 he was a member of the Presidium of the Supreme Council of the RPPS and a member of the State National Council. He fought as an educational officer nicknamed "Lech" in the Warsaw Uprising in the ranks of the People's Army in Śródmieście. After the fall of the uprising, he reached Podhale with a group of RPPS activists and was active in the People's Army partisan unit in the Turbacz area.

=== Communist period ===
After the war, he joined the "Lublin" PPS. At the end of January 1945, he headed the government operational group, which was to organize state and local government administration in Pomerania. On 2 February 1945, this group arrived in Toruń, initially designated as the capital of the Pomeranian Voivodeship. On 2 March that year the capital was moved to Bydgoszcz. Świątkowski, as the representative of the Government of the Republic of Poland for the Pomeranian Voivodeship, served from April 1945 in Bydgoszcz. He considered the most urgent task facing the Pomeranian administration to be efficient spring sowing and the reconstruction of economic life.

On 11 February 1945 he submitted the initiative to establish a university in Toruń, and from 13 April that year he was the chairman of the university's Organizing Committee. On 14 April 1945, he was a co-author of the resolution of the Pomeranian Voivodeship National Council in Bydgoszcz on the establishment of two higher education institutions in Pomerania, namely the University of Toruń and the Technical University in Bydgoszcz, with the proviso that one of these plants must have an agricultural department.

He was active in politics. On 25 February 1945 he was co-opted to the Provisional Supreme Council of the Polish Socialist Party and entrusted with the function of chairman of the Presidium of this council. He also assumed the position of chairman of the Central Party Court of the PPS (until September 1946). He co-organized the Polish Socialist Party in Bydgoszcz and Toruń.

In the years 1945–1948, he was continuously a member of the chief authorities of the PPS. Periodically, he was vice-chairman, and in the period from May to December 1948 - chairman of the Central Executive Committee of the PPS. He was a supporter of cooperation with the Polish Workers' Party and was in favour of removing opponents of a united front with the communists from the PPS authorities.

At the PPR and PPS Unification Congress in December 1948, he was elected to the Central Committee of the newly created Polish United Workers' Party. He was a member of this body until March 1954. In addition, he was a member of the Politburo, Secretariat and Organizational Bureau of the Central Committee of the Polish United Workers' Party (until 1950). From 1945 to 1956 he served as Minister of Justice. Świątkowski's policy led to the creation of a special Law Commission at the Ministry of Justice, which included, among others, MP Michał Szuldenfrei, member of the Law and Regulations Committee of the KRN, Bolesław Walawski, then deputy director of the Political Bureau of the KRN, and head Stefan Piotrowski from the Ministry of Justice. The result of the activities of the said Commission was a statement that coincided with the content of the resolution of the Provisional Government of National Unity of 12 September, which said that the concordat did not need to be broken, because it ceased to be in force due to the fault of the Vatican. From 1945 to 1950 he was the chairman of the Main Board of the Polish-Soviet Friendship Society. In November 1949, he became a member of the National Celebration Committee of the 70th anniversary of Joseph Stalin's birth.

He died on 22 March 1970 in Warsaw. He was buried in the Avenue of the Meritorious at the Powązki Military Cemetery (section A2).
