= Ministry of National Education =

Ministry of National Education can refer to:

- Ministry of National Education (Algeria)
- Ministry of National Education (Colombia)
- Ministry of National Education (France)
- Ministry of National Education and Religious Affairs (Greece)
- Ministry of National Education (Haiti)
- Ministry of National Education (Italy)
- Ministry of National Education (Morocco)
- Ministry of National Education (Poland)
- Ministry of National Education (Romania)
- Ministry of National Education (Turkey)
