= Natolinians =

Political faction in Communist Poland (Feb.–Oct. 1956)

Natolinians Natolińczycy
- Leader: Zenon Nowak; Aleksander Zawadzki; Stefan Jędrychowski; Mieczysław Moczar; Kazimierz Mijal
- Founded: February 1956; 70 years ago
- Dissolved: October 1956; 70 years ago
- Ideology: Communism; Marxism–Leninism; Stalinism; Anti-revisionism; Left-wing nationalism; Endo-Communism
- Political position: Far-left
- National affiliation: PZPR

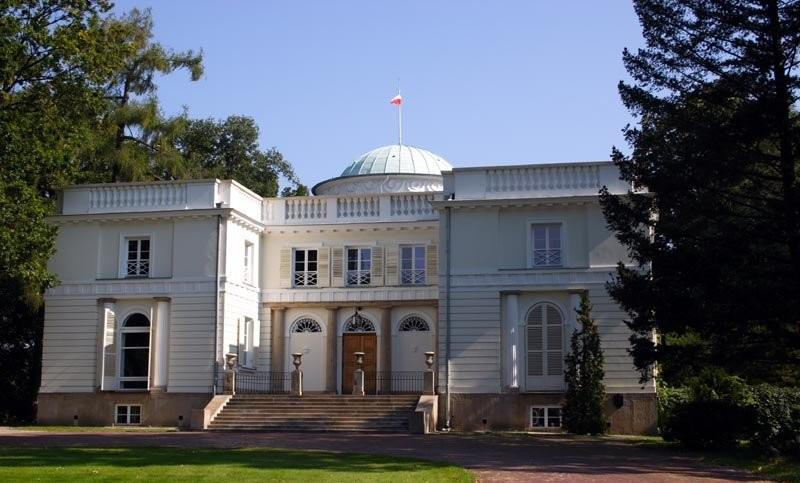
Natolin Palace, meeting-place of the Natolinians

The Natolinians, or the Natolinian faction (Polish: Natolińczycy, frakcja natolińska), were a grouping within the leadership of the communist Polish United Workers' Party (PZPR). Formed around 1956, shortly after the 20th Congress of the Communist Party of the Soviet Union, it was named after the palace where its meetings were held, in Warsaw's Natolin district.

The main opposition to the Natolinians were the reformist Puławians, who included many PZPR members of Jewish extraction.

The Natolinians opposed the post-Stalinist liberalization program (the Polish October "thaw") and, as part of their strategy to seek power, voiced simplistic nationalist and pro-Soviet slogans. The best-known Natolinians included Franciszek Jóźwiak, Wiktor Kłosiewicz, Zenon Nowak, Aleksander Zawadzki, Franciszek Mazur, Władysław Kruczek, Kazimierz Mijal, Władysław Dworakowski, and Hilary Chełchowski. The Natolinian faction was also supported by Soviet leader Nikita Khrushchev because of their pro-Soviet stance.

After the 8th Plenum of the Central Committee of the PZPR, in October 1956, the Natolinians suffered a major setback when the First Secretary of the PZPR, Władysław Gomułka, chose to back (and be backed by) the Puławians.

Both factions, the Natolinians and the Puławians, disappeared from the political scene in the late 1950s.

Witold Jedlicki described the struggle between the Natolinians and the Puławians in his booklet, Simpletons and Yids (Chamy i Żydy).

== Ideology ==
Natolinians have been described as ideologically Stalinist and conservative. They were also described as being characterized by right-wing nationalism, antisemitism, and chauvinistic nationalism. They denounced de-Stalinisation and attacked the reformist Pulawian factions, accusing them of being Jewish and unpatriotic. Natolinians included anti-revisionist currents of the PZPR, including followers of Hoxhaism. After the 1950s, many Natolinians would become the members of the national communist faction of Mieczysław Moczar, the Partisans. Moczar himself previously led the Natolinian faction.
