= Kazimierz Mijal =

Polish Anti-Revisionist Politician

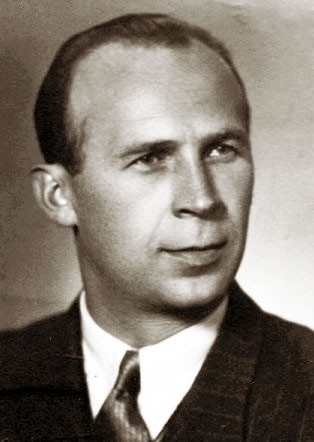
- Born: 15 September 1910; Wilków Pierwszy, Warsaw Governorate, Congress Poland, Russian Empire
- Died: 28 January 2010 (aged 99); Warsaw, Poland
- Political party: KPP (Mijal)
- Other political affiliations: PPR (1942–1948); PZPR (1948–1965)

Kazimierz Romuald Mijal (September 15, 1910 – January 28, 2010) was a Polish communist politician and dissident, best known for founding the illegal Communist Party of Poland (Mijal) in opposition to the Polish United Workers' Party (PZPR) in 1965. He was born in Wilków Pierwszy.

== Biography ==
Born in to a poor peasant family, he Graduated from a Tradesmen's Association Commercial School in Warsaw. Prior to WW2, Mijal was a bank clerk and a trade union activist. He was a sympathizer to the communist movement in Poland, yet he was not a member of the Communist Party. After marrying the communist activist and painter Jadwiga Gniewkowska, Mijal became politically active during World War II, joining the clandestine communist organization "Proletariusz", and aided in founding the Polish Workers' Party, collaborating with Paweł Finder, Marceli Nowotko and Bolesław Bierut. Mijal is credited with organizing attacks carried out by the People's Guard, during the Nazi occupation of Poland.

After the end of the war and the creation of the Polish People's Republic, Mijal held various positions in the party and the state. He served as Mayor of Łódź, chief of the Presidential Chancellery, chief of the Bureau of the Council of Ministers, Minister of Communal Economy, and director of the Investment Bank. He was a long-time member of the Central Committee of the Polish Workers' Party and then the PZPR. Following Nikita Khrushchev's condemnation of former Soviet leader Joseph Stalin at the 20th Congress of the Communist Party of the Soviet Union in 1956, Mijal aligned with the anti-revisionist movement then led primarily by Mao Zedong. He condemned Władysław Gomułka, First Secretary of the Polish United Workers' Party over his siding with Khrushchev and was an important figure in the so-called Natolin faction of the party. During his initial dissent against the PZPR, He wrote several pamphlets condemned by the party as "dogmatic and Stalinist".

He founded a new communist party, the Communist Party of Poland (Mijal) on December 4, 1965, and declared himself Secretary General of the "Temporary Central Committee of the Communist Party of Poland," and took control of Radio Tirana's Polish wing. In February 1966, he used a fake passport to leave for Albania, whose contemporary leader Enver Hoxha led the anti-revisionist movement in Europe, alongside Asian counterpart, Mao Zedong.

Following the Death of Mao Zedong in 1976, Mijal left Albania for China in 1977, publishing the article "Long Live Mao Tsetung Thought" and "The Significance of Theory of Three Worlds" shortly following his arrival. Mijal became unsatisfied with the rule of Hua Guofeng following the Sino-Albanian split in 1978, and Deng Xiaoping's seizure of power in 1981. Mijal secretly returned to Poland in 1983. He was arrested in 1984 for distributing pamphlets critical of Jaruzelski's regime but was released after three months.

Following the collapse of the Polish People's Republic, Mijal's radical views attracted attention from the far-left and far-right due to his opposition to Israel, the European Union, and NATO. He attempted to revive his Communist Party in 1997 but lacked backing.

In 2007 he received honorary membership to the Front Narodowo-Robotniczy. He wrote for the Fatherland Weekly, a left-nationalist newspaper.

He died in January 2010 in Warsaw, Poland. He was buried on the grounds of Protestant Reformed Cemetery, Warsaw.
