= PKP class EW51 =

PKP EW51
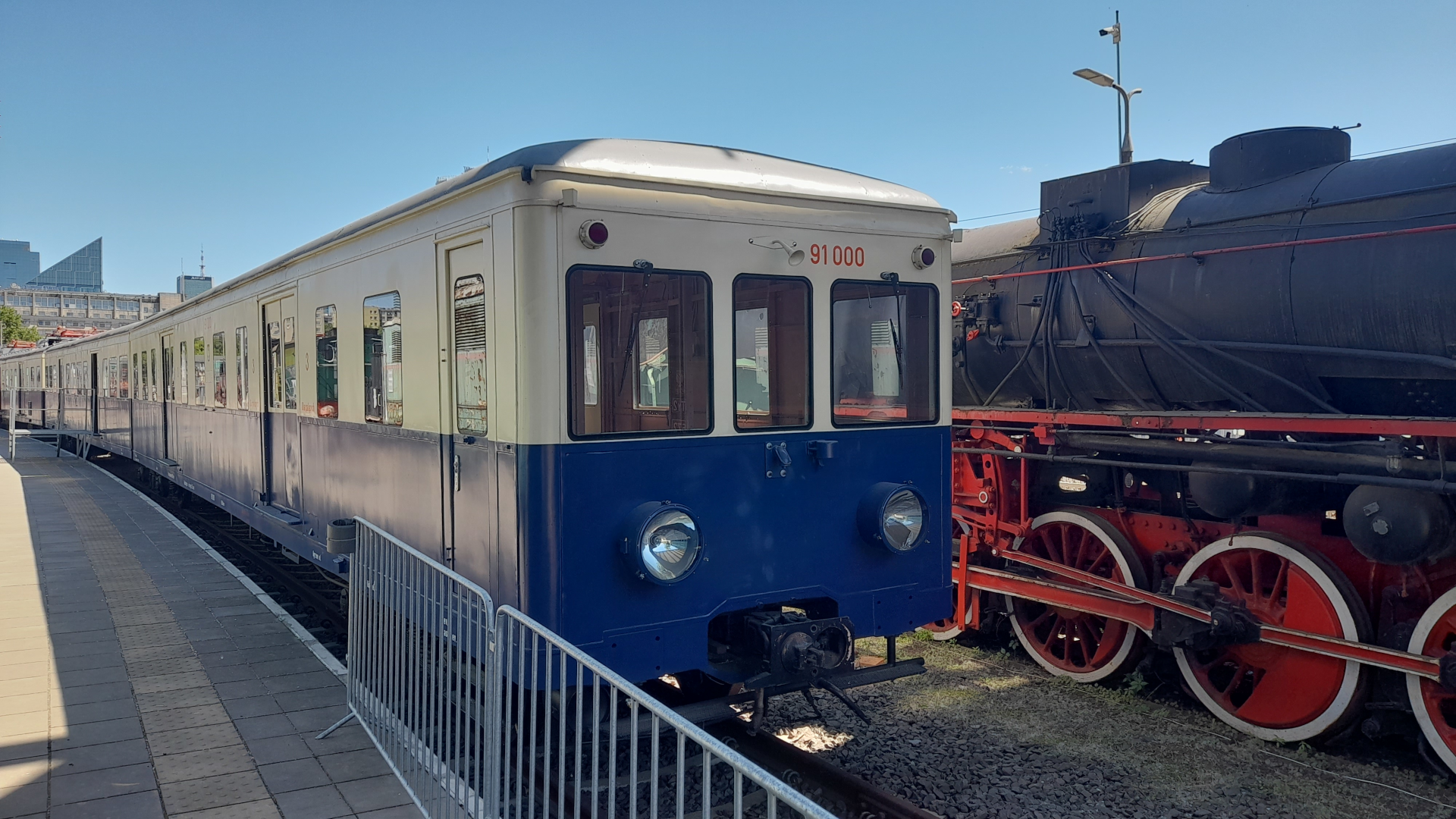
- EW51 on display at the Warsaw Railway Museum
- In service: 1936–1979
- Manufacturer: H. Cegielski; L. Zieleniewski; Lilpop, Rau i Loewenstein; English Electric
- Constructed: 1936–1939
- Refurbished: 1953–1954 by Waggonbau Görlitz
- Number built: 76
- Number preserved: 1
- Formation: motor+trailer+driving trailer
- Operators: Polish State Railways (PKP)

Specifications
- Train length: 63.10 m (207 ft 0 in)
- Maximum speed: 100 km/h (62 mph)
- Weight: 114 tonnes (112 long tons; 126 short tons)
- Power output: Continuous: 432 kW (579 hp)
- Electric system(s): 3 kV DC
- Current collector(s): Overhead line
- UIC classification: Bo'Bo'+2'2'2'
- Braking system(s): Westinghouse pneumatic and electropneumatic brake
- Coupling system: Scharfenberg
- Multiple working: up to 3 units
- Track gauge: 1,435 mm (4 ft 8 1/2 in)

EW51 (originally series 91 000/92 000, later on E400/E500, E93, and E51) was a three-car electric multiple unit, produced by the Lilpop, Rau i Loewenstein plants in Warsaw (mechanical parts of motor cars), H. Cegielski Spółka Akcyjna in Poznań and L. Zieleniewski in Sanok (control cars and trailer cars) in the years 1936–1939. Electrical equipment was supplied by English Electric. The units were intended for suburban traffic in the Warsaw area. Before the war, the units had second- and third-class compartments. A total of 76 units were produced. Currently, the only surviving vehicle, EW51-36, is the property of the Museum Station in Warsaw. Restoration was completed in January 2019.

== Construction ==
Following the electrification of the suburban railway in Warsaw, there was a need for new trains to operate on them. On August 2, 1933, an agreement was reached with British companies to supply electrical equipment for the future units. The chief designer of the mechanical parts of the locomotive was T. Owczarek. A prototype unit was produced in 1935 by Lilpop, Rau and Loewenstein and H. Cegielski. The electrical equipment was installed under the supervision of English specialists.

The work on first units started in July 1936 and one was presented to the public during an exhibition in August 1936 at Pole Mokotowskie in Warsaw. The first train to enter revenue service ran on December 15, 1936. By the end of 1937 the Polish State Railways (PKP) had 60 units in service. A further 16 units were ordered and built by 1939.

The units were marked with the PKP service designation of ECmx (E: electric, C: third class, m: motor car with pantograph, x: four axle) and fleet numbers from 91 001 to 91 076. The trailer carriages were designated EBCbdxx and driving cars received EBCbdsxx, with numbers from 92 001 to 92 076.

The units consisted of three carriages: a motor car, a trailer and a non-powered control car, permanently coupled in operation and could only be separated in a workshop environment. The three-car units were equipped for multiple working and with automatic Scharfenberg couplers, up to three units (i.e. trains consisting of six or nine cars) could be coupled. The use of driver's cabs at both ends meant that the units could travel both ways without having to be turned around.

The motor car was equipped with electrical equipment (3 kV and 110 V) housed in a special compartment, located in the front of the car, adjacent to the driver's cab. The low voltage from a motor-generator set was used to supply auxiliary power and charge the batteries. The trailer and driving trailer had Jacobs bogie, thanks to this the weight of the unit was reduced. The current was collected from an overhead line by one of two pantographs (the rear one), which was raised based on the direction of travel, apart from times when the contact was poor (e.g. icy conditions), when both pantographs were raised. The motor cars were equipped with four traction motors, each driving one axle.

After World War 2 ten units were refurbished at Waggonbau Görlitz and due to a shortage of Jacobs bogies their trailer and control cars each received separate two axle bogies, increasing the total weight of the trainset. The modified units were designated as PKP class EW52. In total 36 units were restored as either EW51 or EW52 and remained in service till the end of 1970's. A single unit has been preserved and transferred to the Warsaw Railway Museum but was allowed to gradually deteriorate at railway siding until 2018 when it was restored and preserved by ZNTK Mińsk Mazowiecki and in 2021 transported by the Masovian Railways for static exhibition in the museums' main site by the Warszawa Główna railway station.

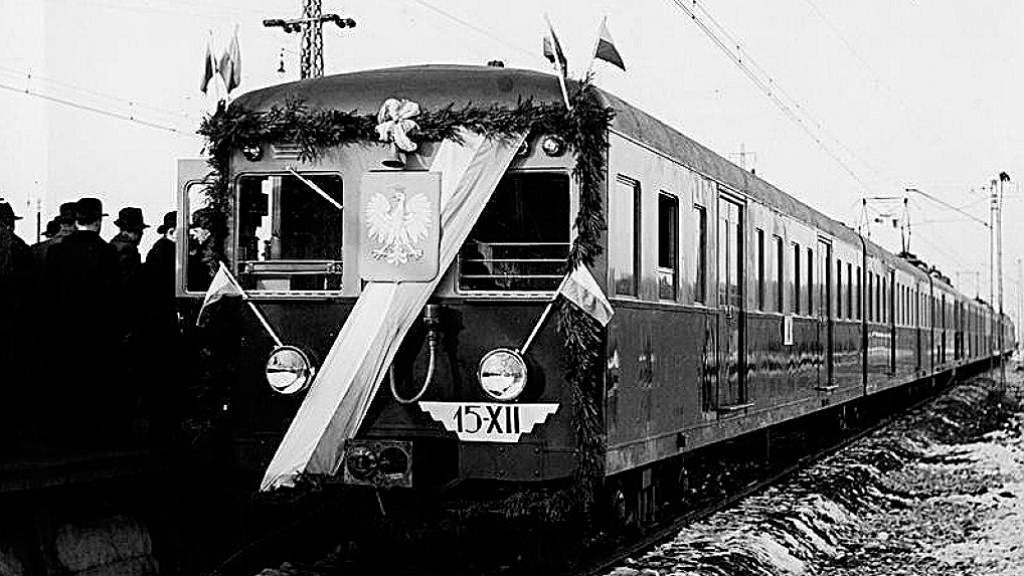
First electric train Józefów railway station near Otwock, December 15th, 1936

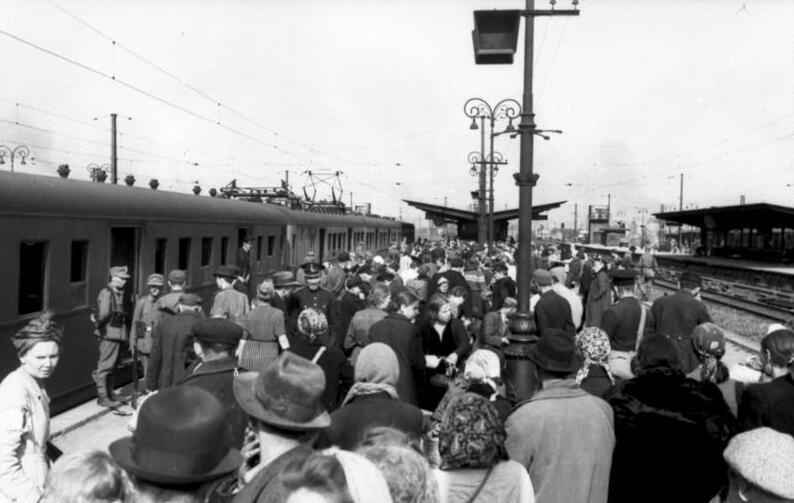
E91 electric multiple unit passing through Warszawa Zachodnia station during the Warsaw Uprising in August 1944

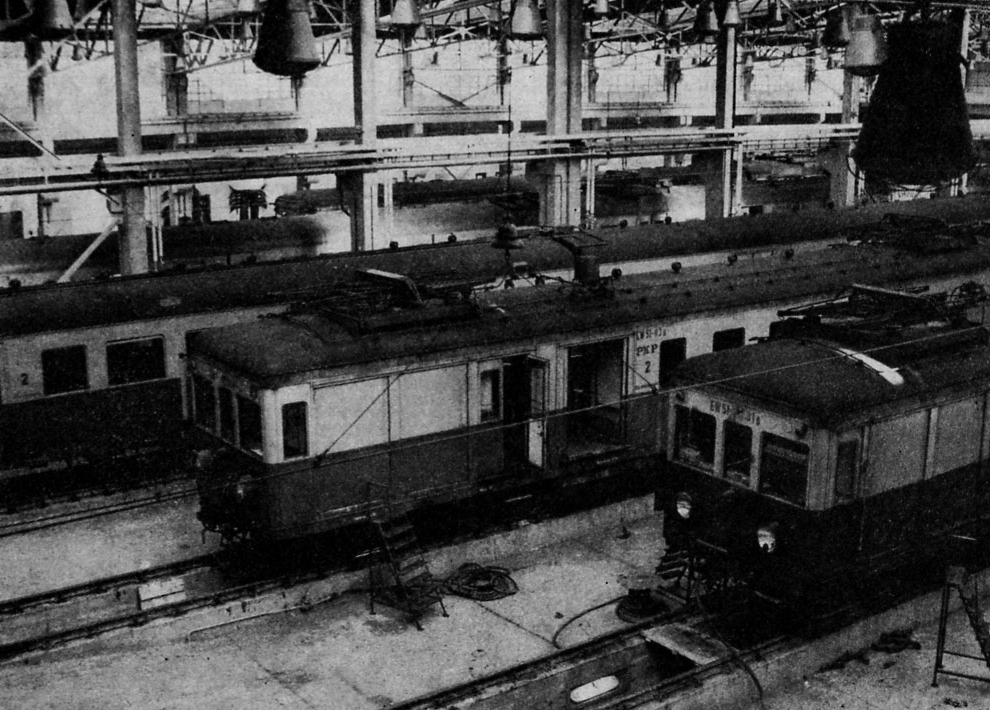
EW51 electric multiple units at a depot in Grochów in 1974

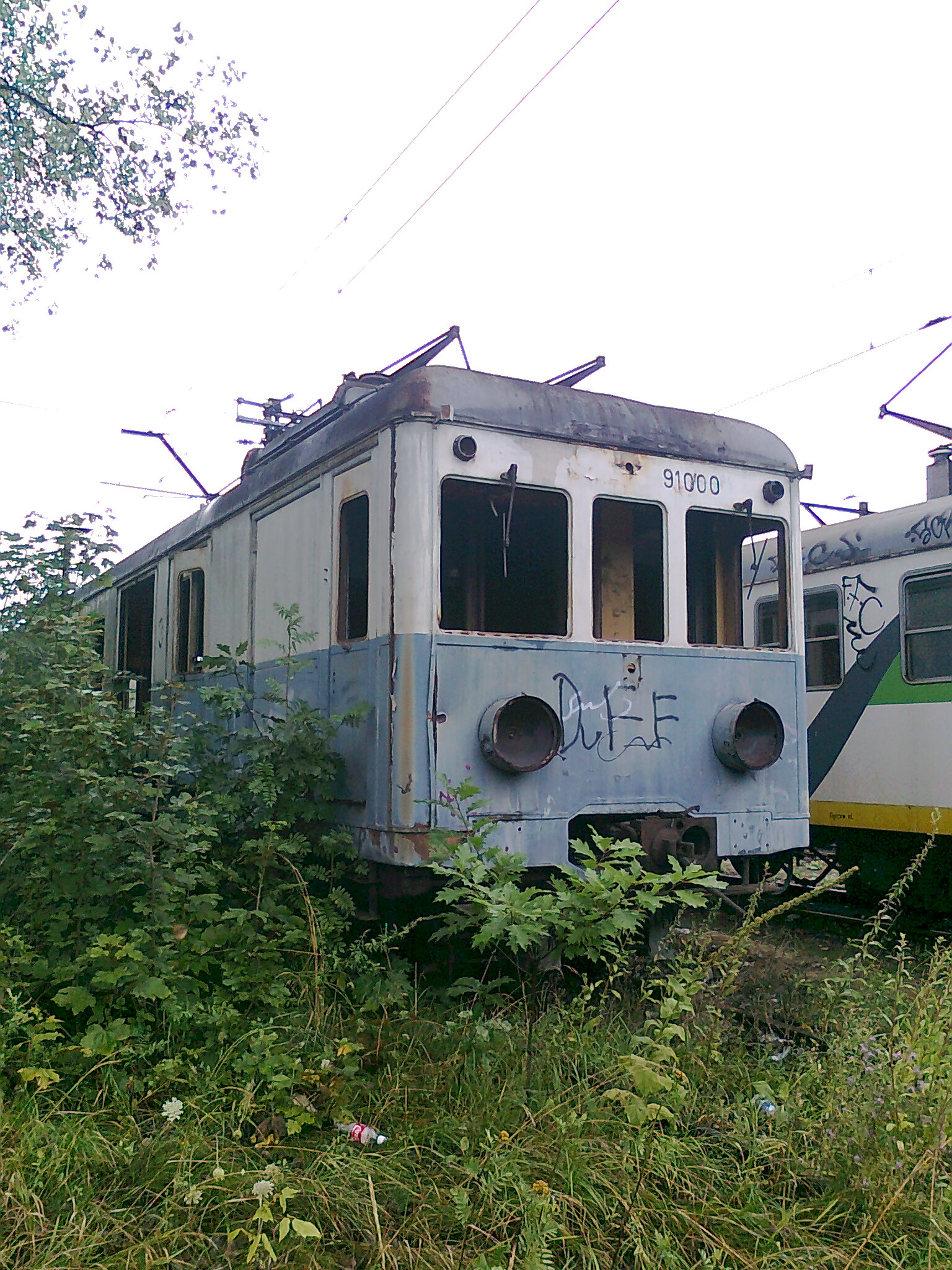
A preserved 91000 abandoned at a railway siding at Olszynka Grochowska, 2010

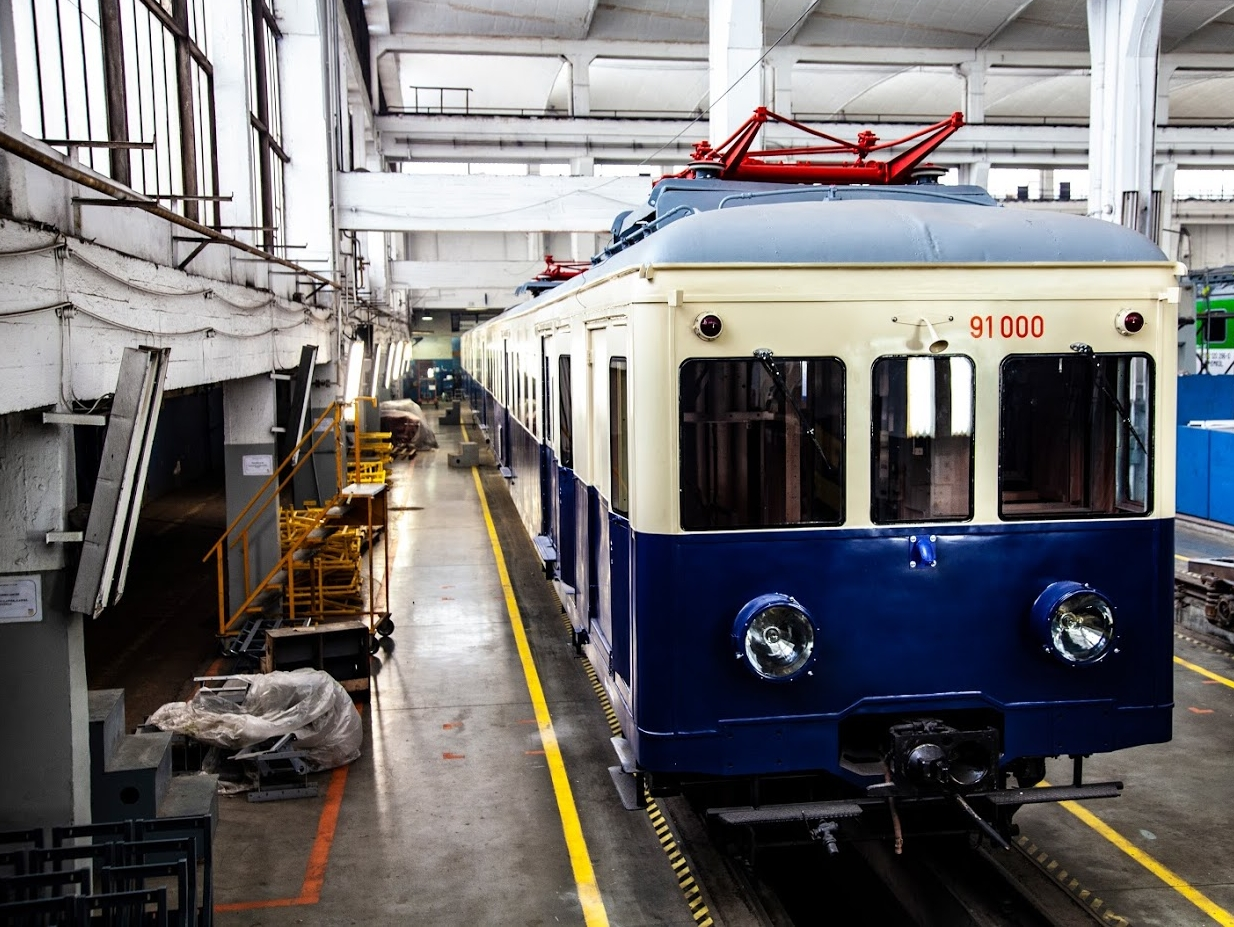
EW51 after restoration in ZNTK Minsk Mazowiecki
