= Second Cyrankiewicz cabinet =

Government of Poland

Second Cabinet of Józef Cyrankiewicz
- 3rd government of the Polish People's Republic

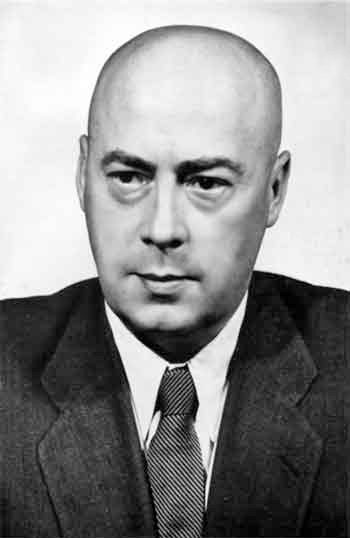
- Date formed: February 27, 1957
- Date dissolved: May 18, 1961

People and organisations
- Head of state: Aleksander Zawadzki
- Head of government: Józef Cyrankiewicz
- Deputy head of government: Stefan Ignar
- No. of ministers: 40
- Member party: Polish United Workers' Party, United People's Party (Poland), Alliance of Democrats (Poland)

History
- Predecessor: Bierut
- Successor: Cyrankiewicz III

The second government of Józef Cyrankiewicz, led by Prime Minister Józef Cyrankiewicz, marked a significant period in Polish political history. Józef Cyrankiewicz, who had held the position of Chairman of the Council of Ministers since March 18, 1954, resigned on February 20, 1957. This resignation followed his dismissal on that day by the State Council. The Sejm of the Polish People's Republic subsequently adopted the government proposal presented by Józef Cyrankiewicz. On February 20, the Sejm appointed Józef Cyrankiewicz as Prime Minister and charged him with outlining the government's composition. A week later, the Sejm approved the proposed government, comprising 30 individuals, including the Prime Minister, three vice-presidents, the chairman of the Planning Commission, and 25 ministers. To accommodate the planned restructuring of the supreme administrative bodies, five ministers held dual portfolios, while two ministries remained vacant. The government remained in office until May 18, 1961, when Prime Minister Józef Cyrankiewicz, along with the entire cabinet, resigned three days before its scheduled dissolution.

== Second Council of Ministers of Józef Cyrankiewicz (1957–1961) ==
Ministry	Name	Time in office	
Ministry	Name	Took office	Left office
Prime Minister	Józef Cyrankiewicz (PZPR)	February 20, 1957	June 5, 1961
Deputy Prime Minister	Stefan Ignar (ZSL)	February 27, 1957	June 5, 1961
Vice-President of the Council of Ministers	Piotr Jaroszewicz (PZPR)	February 27, 1957	June 5, 1961
Vice-President of the Council of Ministers	Zenon Nowak (PZPR)	February 27, 1957	June 5, 1961
Vice-President of the Council of Ministers	Eugeniusz Szyr (PZPR)	October 27, 1959	June 5, 1961
Vice-President of the Council of Ministers	Julian Tokarski (PZPR)	October 27, 1959	June 5, 1961
Minister of Health and Social Welfare (Note: Until April 25, 1960, Minister of Health ({{{title}}}, Dz. U., 1960, vol. 20, No. 119 ).)	Rajmund Barański	February 27, 1957	June 5, 1961
Minister of Education	Władysław Bieńkowski (PZPR)	February 27, 1957	October 27, 1959
Minister of Shipping (Note: From June 11, 1957 ({{{title}}}, Dz. U., 1957, vol. 31, No. 130 ) to July 1, 1960, Minister of Shipping and Water Management ( {{{title}}}, Dz. U., 1960, vol. 29, No. 163 ).)	Stanisław Darski	February 27, 1957	June 5, 1961
Minister of Forestry and Wood Industry	Jan Dąb-Kocioł (ZSL)	February 27, 1957	June 5, 1961
Minister of Finance	Tadeusz Dietrich (PZPR)	February 27, 1957	July 28, 1960
Chairman of the Planning Commission of the Council of Ministers	Stefan Jędrychowski (PZPR)	February 27, 1957	June 5, 1961
Minister of Culture and Art	Karol Kuryluk (PZPR)	February 27, 1957	April 29, 1958
Minister of Internal Trade	Marian Minor (PZPR)	February 27, 1957	August 17, 1957
Minister of Small Industry and Crafts	Zygmunt Moskwa (SD)	February 27, 1957	February 25, 1958
Minister of Communications	Edward Ochab (PZPR)	February 25, 1958	June 5, 1961
Minister of Agriculture	Edward Ochab (PZPR)	February 27, 1957	October 27, 1959
Minister of Construction and the Building Materials Industry (Note: Until April 5, 1957, the Minister of Construction and the Minister of the Building Materials Industry ({{{title}}}, Dz. U., 1957, vol. 17, No. 86 ) .)	Stefan Pietrusiewicz (PZPR)	February 27, 1957	March 25, 1960
Minister of Finance	Jerzy Albrecht (PZPR)	November 16, 1960	June 5, 1961
Minister of Food Industry and Purchasing (Note: Until April 5, 1957, Minister of Food Industry and Minister of Purchasing ({{{title}}}, Dz. U., 1957, vol. 17, No. 86 ).)	Feliks Pisula (ZSL)	February 27, 1957	June 5, 1961
Minister of Communications	Jan Rabanowski (SD)	February 27, 1957	February 25, 1958
Minister of Chemical Industry	Antoni Radliński (PZPR)	February 27, 1957	June 5, 1961
Minister of Foreign Affairs	Adam Rapacki (PZPR)	February 27, 1957	June 5, 1961
Minister of Justice	Marian Rybicki (PZPR)	February 27, 1957	June 5, 1961
Minister of National Defense	Marian Spychalski (PZPR)	February 27, 1957	June 5, 1961
Minister of Light Industry	Eugeniusz Stawiński (PZPR)	February 27, 1957	June 5, 1961
Minister of Communications (Note: Until April 5, 1957, Minister of Railways and Minister of Road and Air Transport ({{{title}}}, Dz. U., 1957, vol. 17, No. 86 ).)	Ryszard Strzelecki (PZPR)	February 27, 1957	February 17, 1960
Minister without portfolio	Jerzy Sztachelski (PZPR)	February 27, 1957	June 5, 1961
Minister of Foreign Trade	Witold Trąmpczyński (PZPR)	February 27, 1957	June 5, 1961
Minister of Mining and Energy (Note: Until April 5, 1957, Minister of Energy and Minister of Coal Mining ({{{title}}}, Dz. U., 1957, vol. 17, No. 86 ) .)	Franciszek Waniołka (PZPR)	February 27, 1957	July 27, 1959
Minister of Heavy Industry	Franciszek Waniołka (PZPR)	July 27, 1959	June 5, 1961
Minister of Internal Affairs	Władysław Wicha (PZPR)	February 27, 1957	June 5, 1961
Minister of Labor and Social Welfare	Stanisław Zawadzki (PZPR)	February 27, 1957	April 25, 1960
Minister of Heavy Industry (Note: Until April 5, 1957, Minister of Metallurgy and Minister of Machinery Industry ({{{title}}}, Dz. U., 1957, vol. 17, No. 86 ).)	Kiejstut Żemaitis (PZPR)	February 27, 1957	July 27, 1959
Minister of Higher Education	Stefan Żółkiewski (PZPR)	February 27, 1957	June 18, 1959
Minister of Internal Trade	Mieczysław Lesz (PZPR)	August 17, 1957	June 5, 1961
Minister of Culture and Art	Tadeusz Galiński (PZPR)	July 2, 1958	June 5, 1961
Minister of Higher Education	Henryk Golański (PZPR)	June 18, 1959	June 5, 1961
Minister of Mining and Energy	Jan Mitręga (PZPR)	July 27, 1959	June 5, 1961
Minister of Agriculture	Mieczysław Jagielski (PZPR)	October 27, 1959	June 5, 1961
Minister of Education	Wacław Tułodziecki (PZPR)	October 27, 1959	June 5, 1961
Minister of Communications	Józef Popielas (PZPR)	February 17, 1960	June 5, 1961
Minister of Construction and Building Materials Industry	Marian Olewiński (PZPR)	March 25, 1960	June 5, 1961
Minister of Finance	Jerzy Albrecht (PZPR)	November 16, 1960	June 5, 1961
Chairman of the Small Industry Committee	Adam Żebrowski (PZPR)	July 30, 1958	June 5, 1961
Chairman of the Technical Committee	Dionyzy Smoleński (PZPR)	March 25, 1960	June 5, 1961
Chairman of the Labor and Wages Committee	Aleksander Burski (PZPR)	June 14, 1960	June 5, 1961
Chairman of the Construction, Urban Planning and Architecture Committee	Stefan Pietrusiewicz (PZPR)	June 22, 1960	June 5, 1961

== On the day of his swearing-in, February 27, 1957 ==
- Józef Cyrankiewicz (PZPR) – President of the Council of Ministers
- Stefan Ignar (ZSL) – Vice-President of the Council of Ministers
- Piotr Jaroszewicz (PZPR) – vice-president of the Council of Ministers
- Zenon Nowak (PZPR) – vice-president of the Council of Ministers
- Rajmund Barański (non-partisan) – Minister of Health
- Władysław Bieńkowski (PZPR) – Minister of Education
- Stanisław Darski (non-partisan) – Minister of Shipping
- Jan Dąb-Kocioł (ZSL) – Minister of Forestry and Wood Industry
- Tadeusz Dietrich (PZPR) – Minister of Finance
- Stefan Jędrychowski (PZPR) – chairman of the Planning Commission of the Council of Ministers
- Karol Kuryluk (PZPR) – Minister of Culture and Art
- Marian Minor (PZPR) – Minister of Internal Trade
- Zygmunt Moskwa (Alliance of Democrats (Poland)|SD) – Minister of Small Industry and Crafts
- Edward Ochab (PZPR) – Minister of Agriculture
- Stefan Pietrusiewicz (PZPR) – Minister of Construction, Minister of Construction Materials Industry
- Feliks Pisula (ZSL) – Minister of Food Industry, Minister of Purchase
- Jan Rabanowski (SD) – Minister of Communications
- Antoni Radliński (PZPR) – Minister of Chemical Industry
- Adam Rapacki (PZPR) – Minister of Foreign Affairs
- Marian Rybicki (PZPR) – Minister of Justice
- Marian Spychalski (PZPR) – Minister of National Defense
- Eugeniusz Stawiński (PZPR) – Minister of Light Industry
- Ryszard Strzelecki (PZPR) – Minister of Railways, Minister of Road and Air Transport
- Jerzy Sztachelski (PZPR) – minister without portfolio
- Witold Trąmpczyński (PZPR) – Minister of Foreign Trade
- Franciszek Waniołka (PZPR) – Minister of Energy, Minister of Coal Mining
- Władysław Wicha (PZPR) – Minister of Internal Affairs
- Stanisław Zawadzki (PZPR) – Minister of Labor and Social Welfare
- Kiejstut Żemaitis (PZPR) – Minister of Metallurgy, Minister of Machinery Industry
- Stefan Żółkiewski (PZPR) – Minister of Higher Education
- vacancy – Minister of Municipal Economy
- vacancy – Minister of State Control

== Changes in the composition of the Council of Ministers ==
- April 5, 1957
  - Ministry name change:
    - The Ministry of Construction and the Ministry of the Building Materials Industry were transformed into the Ministry of Construction and the Building Materials Industry.
    - The Ministry of Energy and the Ministry of Coal Mining were transformed into the Ministry of Mining and Energy.
    - The Ministry of Metallurgy and the Ministry of Machinery Industry were transformed into the Ministry of Heavy Industry.
    - The Ministry of Railways and the Ministry of Road and Air Transport were transformed into the Ministry of Communication.
    - The Ministry of Food Industry and the Ministry of Purchase were transformed into the Ministry of Food Industry and Purchase.
- June 11, 1957
  - Transformation:
    - The Ministry of Shipping was transformed into the Ministry of Shipping and Water Management.
- August 17, 1957
  - Revocation:
    - Mariana Minor from the office of the Minister of Internal Trade (appointed to this office on February 27, 1957).
  - Appointment:
    - Mieczysław Lesz for the office of Minister of Internal Trade.
- February 25, 1958
  - Revocation:
    - Zygmunt Moskwa from the office of the Minister of Small Industry and Crafts (appointed to this office on February 27, 1957).
    - Jan Rabanowski from the office of the Minister of Communications (appointed to this office on February 27, 1957).
  - Appointment:
    - Zygmunt Moskwa for the office of Minister of Communications.
- April 29, 1958
  - Revocation:
    - Karol Kuryluk from the office of the Minister of Culture and Art (appointed to this office on February 27, 1957).
- July 2, 1958
  - Appointment:
    - Tadeusz Galiński for the office of Minister of Culture and Art.
- July 30, 1958
  - Appointment:
    - Adam Żebrowski for the office of chairman of the Small Industry Committee.
- June 18, 1959
  - Revocation:
    - Stefan Żółkiewski from the office of the Minister of Higher Education (appointed to this office on February 27, 1957).
  - Appointment:
    - Henryk Golański for the office of Minister of Higher Education.
- June 18, 1959
  - Revocation:
    - Franciszka Waniołka from the office of the Minister of Mining and Energy (appointed to this office on February 27, 1957).
    - Kiejstut Żemaitis from the office of the Minister of Heavy Industry (appointed to this office on February 27, 1957).
  - Appointment:
    - Jana Mitręga for the office of Minister of Mining and Energy.
    - Franciszka Waniołka for the office of Minister of Heavy Industry.
- October 27, 1959
  - Revocation:
    - Władysław Bieńkowski from the office of the Minister of Education (appointed to this office on February 27, 1957).
    - Edward Ochab from the office of the Minister of Agriculture (appointed to this office on February 27, 1957).
  - Appointment:
    - Mieczysław Jagielski for the office of Minister of Agriculture.
    - Eugeniusza Szyr for the office of Vice-President of the Council of Ministers.
    - Julian Tokarski to the office of Vice-President of the Council of Ministers.
    - Wacław Tułodziecki for the office of Minister of Education.
- February 17, 1960
  - Revocation:
    - Ryszard Strzelecki from the office of the Minister of Communications (appointed to this office on February 27, 1957).
  - Appointment:
    - Józefa Popielas for the office of Minister of Communication.
- 25 mark 1960
  - Revocation:
    - Stefan Pietrusiewicz from the office of the Minister of Construction and the Building Materials Industry (appointed to this office on February 27, 1957).
  - Appointment:
    - Marian Olewiński for the office of Minister of Construction and Building Materials Industry.
    - Dionysius Smoleński for the office of chairman of the Committee for Technology.
- April 25, 1960
  - Ministry name change:
    - The Ministry of Labor and Social Welfare was abolished, Stanisław Zawadzki, Minister of Labor and Social Welfare (appointed to this office on February 27, 1957).
    - The Ministry of Health was transformed into the Ministry of Health and Social Welfare.
- June 14, 1960
  - Appointment:
    - Aleksander Burski for the office of chairman of the Labor and Wages Committee.
- June 22, 1960
  - Appointment:
    - Stefan Pietrusiewicz for the office of chairman of the Construction, Urban Planning and Architecture Committee.
- July 1, 1960
  - Transformation:
    - The Ministry of Shipping and Water Management was transformed into the Ministry of Shipping.
- July 28, 1960
  - Death:
    - Tadeusz Dietrich, Minister of Finance (appointed to this office on February 27, 1957).
- November 16, 1960
  - Appointment:
    - Jerzy Albrecht for the office of Minister of Finance.
