= Deputy Prime Minister of Poland =

Deputy Head of Government of Poland

Vice President of the Council of Ministers
- Wiceprezes Rady Ministrów
- Logo used by institutions of the Polish Government

- Flag of Poland

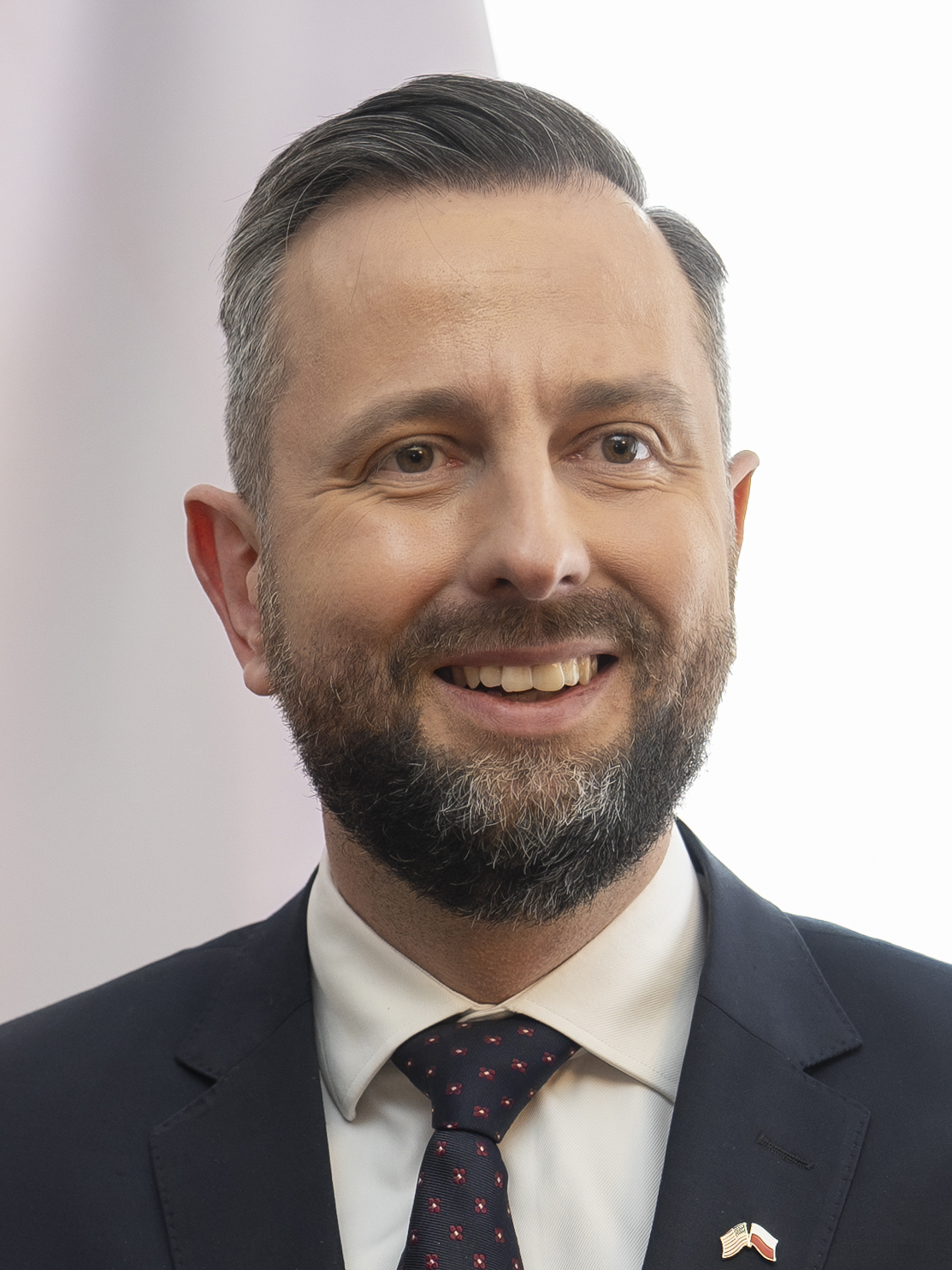
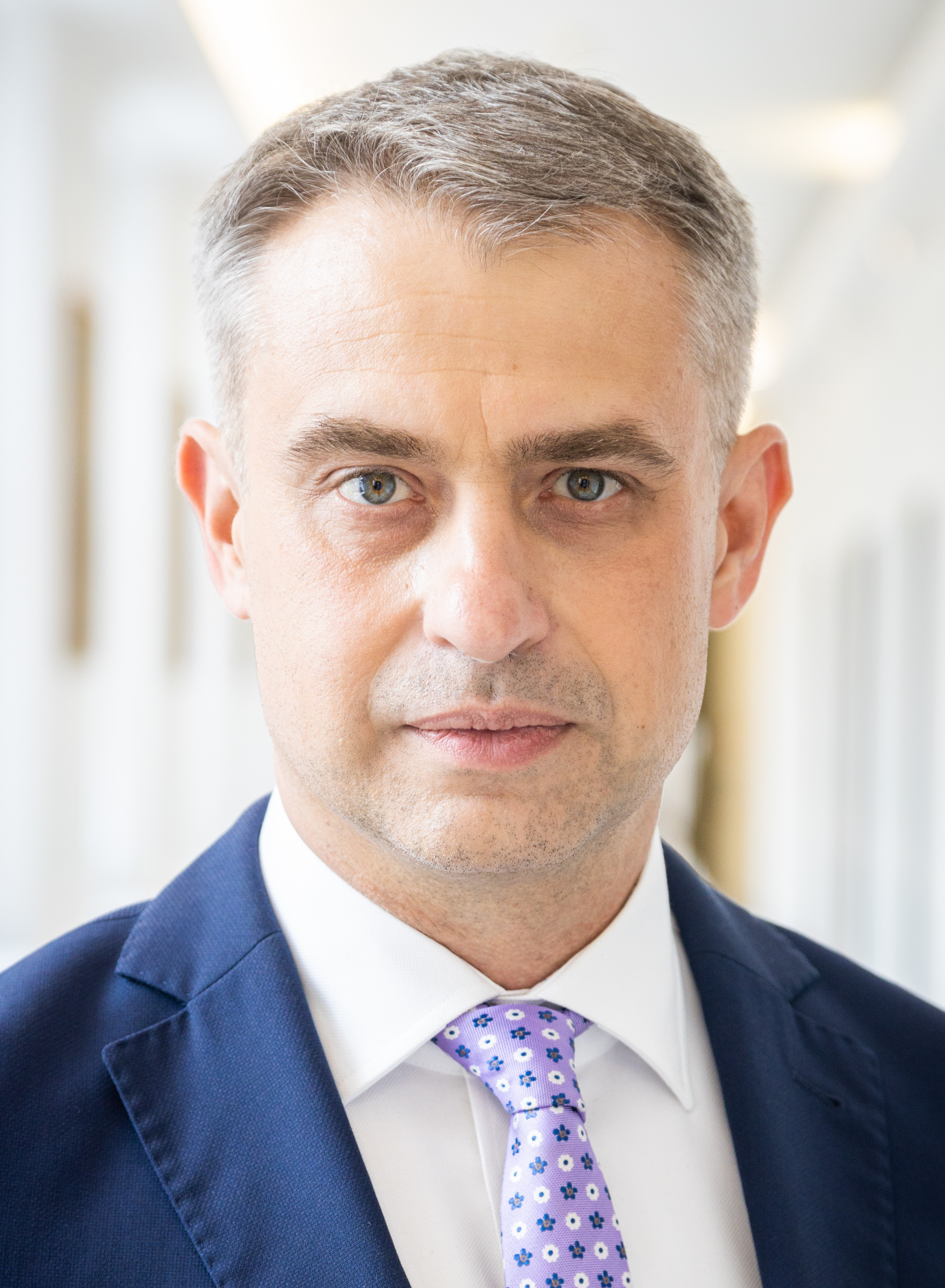
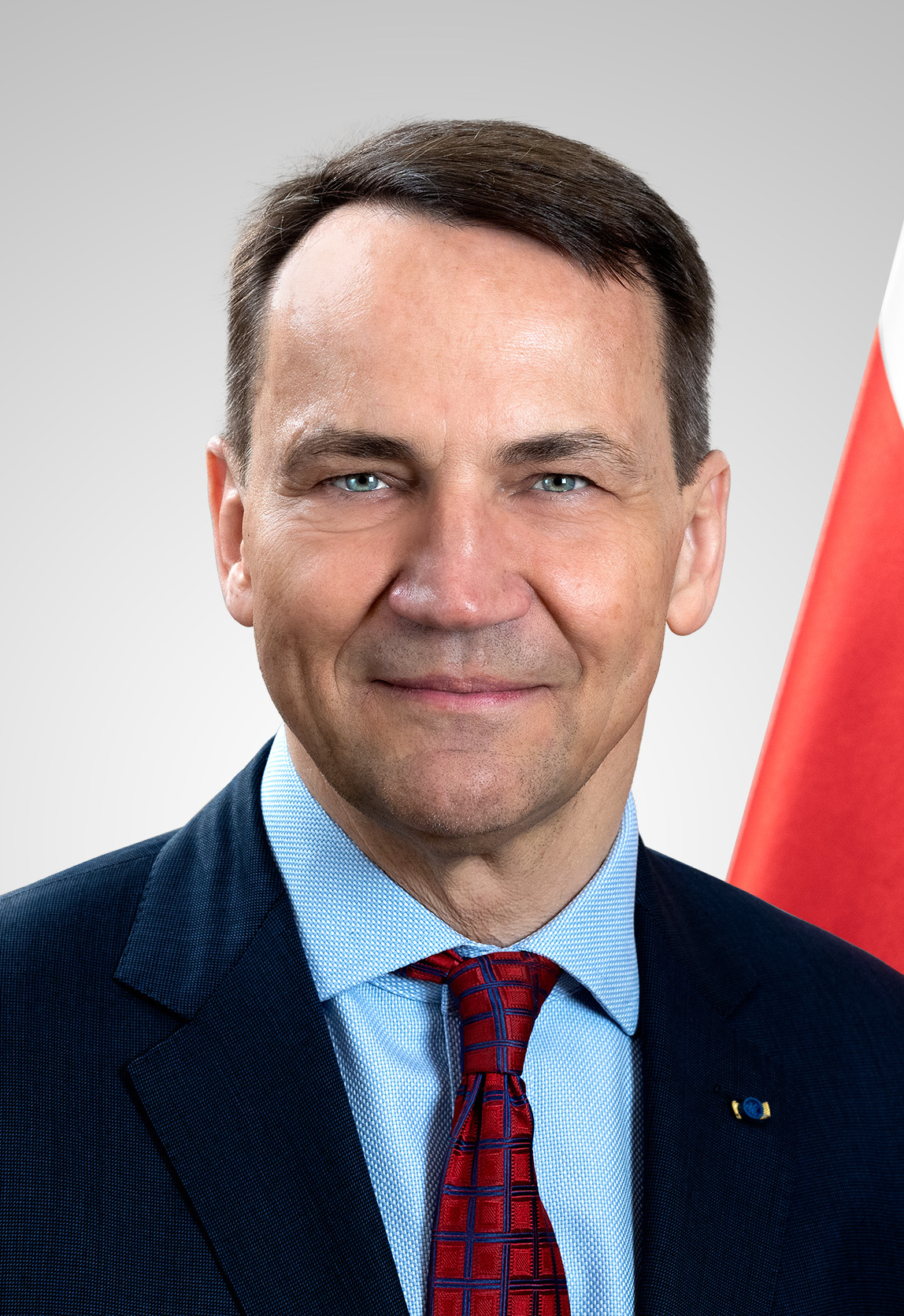
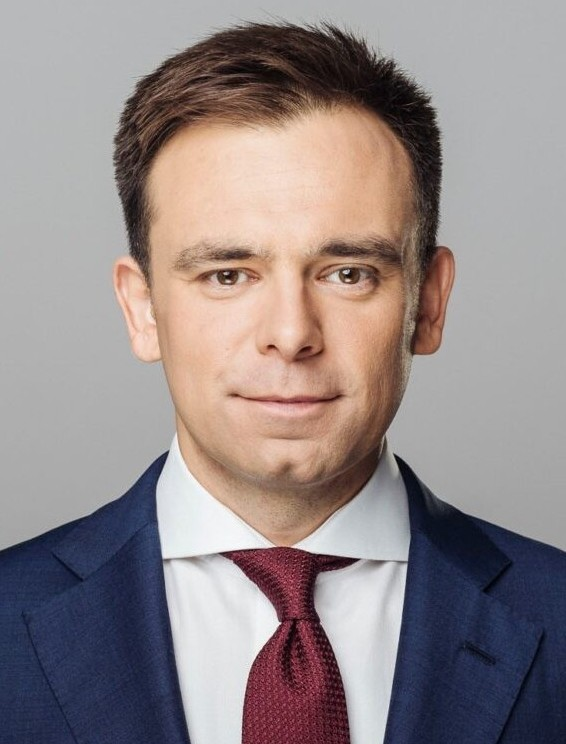
- Incumbent Władysław Kosiniak-Kamysz Krzysztof Gawkowski Radosław Sikorski Andrzej Domański since 13 December 2023 (Kosiniak-Kamysz and Gawkowski), 24 July 2025 (Sikorski), 20 November 2026 (Domański)
- Member of: Council of Ministers
- Reports to: Prime Minister
- Appointer: President of the Republic of Poland; at request of the Prime Minister
- Formation: 1918
- First holder: Józef Mikułowski-Pomorski
- Website: www.gov.pl

The deputy prime minister of Poland (Polish: Wicepremier), formally the vice president of the Council of Ministers (Polish: Wiceprezes Rady Ministrów), is the deputy of the prime minister of Poland and a member of the Council of Ministers. They can also be one of the Ministers of the Republic of Poland. The Constitution of Poland does not limit the number of persons who can hold the position of deputy prime minister simultaneously.

== Deputy prime ministers of communist Poland ==
=== People's Poland (1944–1952) ===
- Polish Committee of National Liberation
  - Wanda Wasilewska (b. 1905 – d. 1964), Deputy Chairman of the Polish Committee of National Liberation from 21 July 1944 to 31 December 1944
  - Andrzej Witos (b. 1878 – d. 1973), Deputy Chairman of the Polish Committee of National Liberation from 21 July 1944 to 9 October 1944
  - Stanisław Janusz (b. 1890 – d. 1970), Deputy Chairman of the Polish Committee of National Liberation from 9 October 1944 to 31 December 1944
- Provisional Government of the Republic of Poland
  - Stanisław Janusz (b. 1890 – d. 1970), Deputy Prime Minister from 31 December 1944 to 28 June 1945
  - Władysław Gomułka (b. 1905 – d. 1982), from 31 December 1944 to 28 June 1945
- Provisional Government of National Unity
  - Władysław Gomułka (b. 1905 – d. 1982), from 28 June 1945 to 6 February 1947
  - Stanisław Mikołajczyk (b. 1901 – d. 1966), from 28 June 1945 to 6 February 1947
- First Cabinet of Józef Cyrankiewicz
  - Władysław Gomułka (b. 1905 – d. 1982), from 6 February 1947 to 20 January 1949
  - Antoni Korzycki (b. 1904 – d. 1990), from 6 February 1947 to 20 November 1952
  - Aleksander Zawadzki (b. 1899 – d. 1964), from 20 January 1949 to 10 June 1949 i from 28 April 1950 to 20 November 1952
  - Hilary Minc (b. 1905 – d. 1974), from 20 April 1949 to 20 November 1952
  - Hilary Chełchowski (b. 1908 – d. 1983), from 10 June 1950 to 20 November 1952
  - Stefan Jędrychowski (b. 1910 – d. 1996), from 12 December 1951 to 20 November 1952
  - Tadeusz Gede (b. 1911 – d. 1982), from 30 June 1952 to 20 November 1952

=== People's Republic of Poland (1952–1989) ===
- Cabinet of Bolesław Bierut
  - Józef Cyrankiewicz (b. 1911 – d. 1989), from 20 November 1952 to 18 March 1954
  - Władysław Dworakowski (b. 1908 – d. 1976), from 20 November 1952 to 18 March 1954
  - Tadeusz Gede (b. 1911 – d. 1982), from 20 November 1952 to 18 March 1954
  - Piotr Jaroszewicz (b. 1909 – d. 1992), from 20 November 1952 to 18 March 1954
  - Stefan Jędrychowski (b. 1910 – d. 1996), from 20 November 1952 to 18 March 1954
  - Hilary Minc (b. 1905 – d. 1974), from 20 November 1952 to 18 March 1954
  - Zenon Nowak (b. 1905 – d. 1980), from 20 November 1952 to 18 March 1954
  - Konstanty Rokossowski (b. 1896 – d. 1968), from 20 November 1952 to 18 March 1954
- First Cabinet of Józef Cyrankiewicz
  - Jakub Berman (b. 1901 – d. 1984), from 18 March 1954 to 4 May 1956
  - Hilary Minc (b. 1905 – d. 1974), I zastępca Premiera from 18 March 1954 to 10 October 1956
  - Zenon Nowak (b. 1905 – d. 1980), II zastępca Premiera from 18 March 1954 to 24 October 1956
  - Tadeusz Gede (b. 1911 – d. 1982), from 18 March 1954 to 24 October 1956
  - Stefan Jędrychowski (b. 1910 – d. 1996), from 18 March 1954 to 24 October 1956
  - Konstanty Rokossowski (b. 1896 – d. 1968), from 18 March 1954 to 13 November 1956
  - Piotr Jaroszewicz (b. 1909 – d. 1992), from 18 March 1954 to 20 February 1957
  - Stanisław Łapot (b. 1914 – d. 1972), from 14 May 1954 to 20 February 1957
  - Franciszek Jóźwiak (b. 1895 – d. 1966), from 16 April 1955 to 20 February 1957
  - Eugeniusz Stawiński (b. 1905 – d. 1989), from 4 May 1956 to 20 February 1957
  - Zenon Nowak (b. 1905 – d. 1980), from 24 October 1956 to 20 February 1957
  - Stefan Ignar (b. 1908 – d. 1992), from 24 October 1956 to 20 February 1957
- Second Cabinet of Józef Cyrankiewicz
  - Eugeniusz Stawiński (b. 1905 – d. 1989), from 27 February 1957 to 15 May 1961
  - Zenon Nowak (b. 1905 – d. 1980), from 27 February 1957 to 15 May 1961
  - Stefan Ignar (b. 1908 – d. 1992), from 27 February 1957 to 15 May 1961
  - Piotr Jaroszewicz (b. 1909 – d. 1992), from 27 February 1957 to 15 May 1961
  - Eugeniusz Szyr (b. 1915 – d. 2000), from 27 October 1959 to 15 May 1961
  - Julian Tokarski (b. 1903 – d. 1977), from 27 October 1959 to 15 May 1961
- Third Cabinet of Józef Cyrankiewicz
  - Stefan Ignar (b. 1908 – d. 1992), from 18 May 1961 to 24 June 1965
  - Piotr Jaroszewicz (b. 1909 – d. 1992), from 18 May 1961 to 24 June 1965
  - Zenon Nowak (b. 1905 – d. 1980), from 18 May 1961 to 24 June 1965
  - Eugeniusz Szyr (b. 1915 – d. 2000), from 18 May 1961 to 24 June 1965
  - Julian Tokarski (b. 1903 – d. 1977), from 18 May 1961 to 24 June 1965
  - Franciszek Waniołka (b. 1912 – d. 1971), from 28 July 1962 to 24 June 1965
- Fourth Cabinet of Józef Cyrankiewicz
  - Julian Tokarski (b. 1903 – d. 1977), from 25 June 1965 to 14 December 1965
  - Zenon Nowak (b. 1905 – d. 1980), from 25 June 1965 to 22 December 1968
  - Eugeniusz Szyr (b. 1915 – d. 2000), from 25 June 1965 to 22 December 1968
  - Franciszek Waniołka (b. 1912 – d. 1971), from 25 June 1965 to 22 December 1968
  - Stefan Ignar (b. 1908 – d. 1992), from 25 June 1965 to 27 June 1969
  - Piotr Jaroszewicz (b. 1909 – d. 1992), from 25 June 1965 to 27 June 1969
- Fifth Cabinet of Józef Cyrankiewicz
  - Stanisław Kociołek (b. 1933 – d. 2015), from 30 June 1970 to 23 December 1970
  - Marian Olewiński (b. 1912 – d. 1982), from 28 June 1969 to 30 June 1970
  - Piotr Jaroszewicz (b. 1909 – d. 1992), from 28 June 1969 to 23 December 1970
  - Stanisław Majewski (b. 1915 – d. 1985), from 28 June 1969 to 23 December 1970
  - Eugeniusz Szyr (b. 1915 – d. 2000), from 28 June 1969 to 23 December 1970
  - Zdzisław Tomal (b. 1921 – d. 1984), from 28 June 1969 to 23 December 1970
  - Józef Kulesza (b. 1919 – d. 1985), from 6 March 1970 to 23 December 1970
  - Mieczysław Jagielski (b. 1924 – d. 1997), from 30 June 1970 to 23 December 1970
- First Cabinet of Piotr Jaroszewicz
  - Kazimierz Olszewski (b. 1917 – d. 2014), from 29 March 1972 to 25 March 1976
  - Józef Tejchma (b. 1927 – d. 2021), from 29 March 1972 to 25 March 1976
  - Tadeusz Pyka (b. 1930 – d. 2009), from 23 October 1975 to 25 March 1976
  - Stanisław Majewski (b. 1915 – d. 1985), from 23 December 1970 to 13 February 1971
  - Eugeniusz Szyr (b. 1915 – d. 2000), from 23 December 1970 to 28 March 1972
  - Jan Mitręga (b. 1917 – d. 2007), from 23 December 1970 to 21 February 1975
  - Józef Kulesza (b. 1919 – d. 1985), from 23 December 1970 to 28 March 1972
  - Zdzisław Tomal (b. 1921 – d. 1984), from 23 December 1970 to 25 March 1976
  - Franciszek Kaim (b. 1919 – d. 1996), from 23 December 1970 to 25 March 1976
  - Mieczysław Jagielski (b. 1924 – d. 1997), from 23 December 1970 to 25 March 1976
  - Wincenty Kraśko (b. 1916 – d. 1976), from 13 February 1971 to 28 March 1972
  - Franciszek Szlachcic (b. 1920 – d. 1990), from 29 May 1974 to 25 March 1976
  - Alojzy Karkoszka (b. 1929 – d. 2001), from 28 May 1975 to 25 March 1976
  - Tadeusz Wrzaszczyk (b. 1932 – d. 2002), from 23 October 1975 to 25 March 1976
- Second Cabinet of Piotr Jaroszewicz
  - Kazimierz Olszewski (b. 1917 – d. 2014), from 27 March 1976 to 17 December 1977
  - Józef Tejchma (b. 1927 – d. 2021), from 27 March 1976 to 8 February 1979
  - Tadeusz Pyka (b. 1930 – d. 2009), from 27 March 1976 to 3 April 1980
  - Alojzy Karkoszka (b. 1929 – d. 2001), from 27 March 1976 to 2 December 1976
  - Franciszek Kaim (b. 1919 – d. 1996), from 27 March 1976 to 8 February 1979
  - Longin Cegielski (b. 1920 – d. 1987), from 27 March 1976 to 3 April 1980
  - Tadeusz Wrzaszczyk (b. 1932 – d. 2002), from 27 March 1976 to 3 April 1980
  - Mieczysław Jagielski (b. 1924 – d. 1997), from 27 March 1976 to 3 April 1980
  - Józef Kępa (b. 1928 – d. 1998), from 2 December 1976 to 8 February 1979
  - Kazimierz Secomski (b. 1910 – d. 2002), from 2 December 1976 to 3 April 1980
  - Jan Szydlak (b. 1925 – 1997), from 2 December 1976 to 3 April 1980
- Cabinet of Edward Babiuch
  - Tadeusz Pyka (b. 1930 – d. 2009), from 3 April 1980 to 24 August 1980
  - Roman Malinowski (b. 1935 – d. 2021), from 3 April 1980 to 24 August 1980
  - Tadeusz Wrzaszczyk (b. 1932 – d. 2002), from 3 April 1980 to 24 August 1980
  - Kazimierz Barcikowski (b. 1927 – d. 2007), from 3 April 1980 to 24 August 1980
  - Mieczysław Jagielski (b. 1924 – d. 1997), from 3 April 1980 to 24 August 1980
- Cabinet of Józef Pińkowski
  - Aleksander Kopeć (b. 1932 – d. 2015), from 24 August 1980 to 12 February 1981
  - Roman Malinowski (b. 1935 – d. 2021), from 24 August 1980 to 12 February 1981
  - Stanisław Mach (b. 1938), from 8 October 1980 to 12 February 1981
  - Kazimierz Barcikowski (b. 1927 – d. 2007), from 24 August 1980 to 8 October 1980
  - Tadeusz Grabski (b. 1929 – d. 1998), from 24 August 1980 to 8 October 1980
  - Henryk Kisiel (b. 1921 – d. 2000), from 24 August 1980 to 12 February 1981
  - Mieczysław Jagielski (b. 1924 – d. 1997), from 24 August 1980 to 12 February 1981
  - Stanisław Kowalczyk (b. 1924 – d. 1998), from 8 October 1980 to 12 February 1981
  - Jerzy Ozdowski (b. 1925 – d. 1994), from 21 November 1980 to 12 February 1981
- Cabinet of Wojciech Jaruzelski
  - Stanisław Mach (b. 1938), from 12 February 1981 to 31 October 1981
  - Andrzej Jedynak (b. 1932 – d. 2024), from 12 February 1981 to 9 October 1982
  - Roman Malinowski (b. 1935 – d. 2021), from 12 February 1981 to 12 November 1985
  - Zbigniew Madej (b. 1932 – d. 2024), from 12 June 1981 to 9 October 1982
  - Janusz Obodowski (b. 1930 – d. 2011), from 31 July 1981 to 12 November 1985
  - Zbigniew Szałajda (b. 1934 – d. 2024), from 9 October 1982 to 12 November 1985
  - Zbigniew Messner (b. 1929 – d. 2014), from 22 November 1983 to 12 November 1985
  - Manfred Gorywoda (b. 1942), from 22 November 1983 to 12 November 1985
  - Zenon Komender (b. 1923 – d. 1993), from 21 July 1982 to 12 November 1985
  - Mieczysław Jagielski (b. 1924 – d. 1997), from 12 February 1981 to 31 July 1981
  - Jerzy Ozdowski (b. 1925 – d. 1994), from 12 February 1981 to 21 July 1982
  - Henryk Kisiel (b. 1921 – d. 2000), from 12 February 1981 to 12 June 1981
  - Edward Kowalczyk (b. 1924 – d. 2000), from 31 October 1981 to 12 November 1985
  - Mieczysław F. Rakowski (b. 1926 – d. 2008), from 12 February 1981 to 12 November 1985
- Cabinet of Zbigniew Messner
  - Manfred Gorywoda (b. 1942), from 12 November 1985 to 23 October 1987
  - Józef Kozioł (b. 1939 – d. 2023), from 12 November 1985 to 14 October 1988
  - Zbigniew Szałajda (b. 1934 – d. 2024), from 12 November 1985 to 14 October 1988
  - Zdzisław Sadowski (b. 1925 – d. 2018), from 23 October 1987 to 14 October 1988
  - Zbigniew Gertych (b. 1922 – d. 2008), from 12 November 1985 to 16 April 1987
  - Władysław Gwiazda (b. 1935 – d. 1998), from 12 November 1985 to 23 October 1987
- Cabinet of Mieczysław Rakowski
  - Janusz Patorski (b. 1946), from 14 October 1988 to 1 August 1989
  - Kazimierz Olesiak (b. 1937), from 14 October 1988 to 1 August 1989
  - Ireneusz Sekuła (b. 1943 – d. 2000), from 14 October 1988 to 1 August 1989
- Cabinet of Tadeusz Mazowiecki
  - Leszek Balcerowicz (b. 1947), from 12 September 1989 to 31 December 1989
  - Czesław Janicki (b. 1926 – d. 2012), from 12 September 1989 to 31 December 1989
  - Czesław Kiszczak (b. 1925 – d. 2015), from 12 September 1989 to 31 December 1989
  - Jan Janowski (b. 1928 – d. 1998), from 12 September 1989 to 31 December 1989

== Deputy prime ministers of the Third Polish Republic (1990–present) ==
There were no deputy prime ministers in the cabinet of Jan Olszewski, in the first cabinet of Waldemar Pawlak and in the third cabinet of Mateusz Morawiecki.

Prime Minister	Deputy Prime Minister	Term
Tadeusz Mazowiecki (Cabinet)	Czesław Janicki	24 August 1989 – 6 July 1990
Tadeusz Mazowiecki (Cabinet)	Czesław Kiszczak	24 August 1989 – 6 July 1990
Tadeusz Mazowiecki (Cabinet)	Leszek Balcerowicz	24 August 1989 – 12 January 1991
Tadeusz Mazowiecki (Cabinet)	Jan Janowski	24 August 1989 – 12 January 1991
Jan Krzysztof Bielecki (Cabinet)	Leszek Balcerowicz	12 January 1991 – 5 December 1991
Hanna Suchocka (Cabinet)	Henryk Goryszewski	11 July 1992 – 26 October 1993
Hanna Suchocka (Cabinet)	Paweł Łączkowski	11 July 1992 – 26 October 1993
Waldemar Pawlak (Second Cabinet)	Marek Borowski	26 October 1993 – 8 February 1994
Waldemar Pawlak (Second Cabinet)	Włodzimierz Cimoszewicz	26 October 1993 – 1 March 1995
Waldemar Pawlak (Second Cabinet)	Aleksander Łuczak	26 October 1993 – 1 March 1995
Józef Oleksy (Cabinet)	Roman Jagieliński	7 March 1995 – 7 February 1996
Józef Oleksy (Cabinet)	Grzegorz Kołodko	7 March 1995 – 7 February 1996
Józef Oleksy (Cabinet)	Aleksander Łuczak	7 March 1995 – 7 February 1996
Włodzimierz Cimoszewicz (Cabinet)	Grzegorz Kołodko	7 February 1996 – 4 February 1997
Włodzimierz Cimoszewicz (Cabinet)	Roman Jagieliński	7 February 1996 – 10 April 1997
Włodzimierz Cimoszewicz (Cabinet)	Mirosław Pietrewicz	7 February 1996 – 31 October 1997
Włodzimierz Cimoszewicz (Cabinet)	Marek Belka	4 February 1997 – 31 October 1997
Włodzimierz Cimoszewicz (Cabinet)	Jarosław Kalinowski	25 April 1997 – 31 October 1997
Jerzy Buzek (Cabinet)	Janusz Tomaszewski	31 October 1997 – 3 September 1999
Jerzy Buzek (Cabinet)	Leszek Balcerowicz	31 October 1997 – 8 June 2000
Jerzy Buzek (Cabinet)	Longin Komołowski	19 October 1999 – 19 October 2001
Jerzy Buzek (Cabinet)	Janusz Steinhoff	12 June 2000 – 19 October 2001
Leszek Miller (Cabinet)	Marek Belka	19 October 2001 – 6 July 2002
Leszek Miller (Cabinet)	Jarosław Kalinowski	19 October 2001 – 3 March 2003
Leszek Miller (Cabinet)	Marek Pol	19 October 2001 – 2 May 2004
Leszek Miller (Cabinet)	Grzegorz Kołodko	6 July 2002 – 16 June 2003
Leszek Miller (Cabinet)	Jerzy Hausner	16 June 2003 – 2 May 2004
Leszek Miller (Cabinet)	Józef Oleksy	21 January 2004 – 21 April 2004
Marek Belka (First Cabinet)	Jerzy Hausner	2 May 2004 – 11 June 2004
Marek Belka (First Cabinet)	Izabela Jaruga-Nowacka	2 May 2004 – 11 June 2004
Marek Belka (Second Cabinet)	Jerzy Hausner	11 June 2004 – 31 March 2005
Marek Belka (Second Cabinet)	Izabela Jaruga-Nowacka	11 June 2004 – 31 October 2005
Kazimierz Marcinkiewicz (Cabinet)	Ludwik Dorn	21 November 2005 – 14 July 2006
Kazimierz Marcinkiewicz (Cabinet)	Zyta Gilowska	7 January 2006 – 24 June 2006
Kazimierz Marcinkiewicz (Cabinet)	Roman Giertych	5 May 2006 – 14 July 2006
Kazimierz Marcinkiewicz (Cabinet)	Andrzej Lepper	5 May 2006 – 14 July 2006
Jarosław Kaczyński (Cabinet)	Andrzej Lepper	14 July 2006 – 22 September 2006
Jarosław Kaczyński (Cabinet)	Ludwik Dorn	14 July 2006 – 27 April 2007
Jarosław Kaczyński (Cabinet)	Andrzej Lepper	16 October 2006 – 9 July 2007
Jarosław Kaczyński (Cabinet)	Roman Giertych	14 July 2006 – 13 August 2007
Jarosław Kaczyński (Cabinet)	Zyta Gilowska	22 September 2006 – 7 September 2007
Jarosław Kaczyński (Cabinet)	Przemysław Gosiewski	8 May 2007 – 7 September 2007
Jarosław Kaczyński (Cabinet)	Zyta Gilowska	10 September 2007 – 16 November 2007
Jarosław Kaczyński (Cabinet)	Przemysław Gosiewski	11 September 2007 – 16 November 2007
Donald Tusk (First Cabinet)	Grzegorz Schetyna	16 November 2007 – 13 October 2009
Donald Tusk (First Cabinet)	Waldemar Pawlak	16 November 2007 – 18 November 2011
Donald Tusk (Second Cabinet)	Waldemar Pawlak	18 November 2011 – 27 November 2012
Donald Tusk (Second Cabinet)	Janusz Piechociński	6 December 2012 – 22 September 2014
Donald Tusk (Second Cabinet)	Jan Vincent-Rostowski	25 February 2013 – 27 November 2013
Donald Tusk (Second Cabinet)	Elżbieta Bieńkowska	27 November 2013 – 22 September 2014
Ewa Kopacz (Cabinet)	Janusz Piechociński	22 September 2014 – 16 November 2015
Ewa Kopacz (Cabinet)	Tomasz Siemoniak	22 September 2014 – 16 November 2015
Beata Szydło (Cabinet)	Piotr Gliński	16 November 2015 – 11 December 2017
Beata Szydło (Cabinet)	Jarosław Gowin	16 November 2015 – 11 December 2017
Beata Szydło (Cabinet)	Mateusz Morawiecki	16 November 2015 – 11 December 2017
Mateusz Morawiecki (First Cabinet)	Piotr Gliński	11 December 2017 – 15 November 2019
Mateusz Morawiecki (First Cabinet)	Jarosław Gowin	11 December 2017 – 15 November 2019
Mateusz Morawiecki (First Cabinet)	Beata Szydło	11 December 2017 – 4 June 2019
Mateusz Morawiecki (First Cabinet)	Jacek Sasin	4 June 2019 – 15 November 2019
Mateusz Morawiecki (Second Cabinet)	Piotr Gliński	15 November 2019 – 20 June 2023
Mateusz Morawiecki (Second Cabinet)	Jarosław Gowin	15 November 2019 – 9 April 2020
Mateusz Morawiecki (Second Cabinet)	Jacek Sasin	15 November 2019 – 20 June 2023
Mateusz Morawiecki (Second Cabinet)	Jadwiga Emilewicz	9 April 2020 – 6 October 2020
Mateusz Morawiecki (Second Cabinet)	Jarosław Gowin	6 October 2020 – 11 August 2021
Mateusz Morawiecki (Second Cabinet)	Jarosław Kaczyński	6 October 2020 – 19 June 2022
Mateusz Morawiecki (Second Cabinet)	Henryk Kowalczyk	26 October 2021 – 20 June 2023
Mateusz Morawiecki (Second Cabinet)	Mariusz Błaszczak	22 June 2022 – 20 June 2023
Mateusz Morawiecki (Second Cabinet)	Jarosław Kaczyński	21 June 2023 – 27 November 2023
Donald Tusk (Third Cabinet)	Władysław Kosiniak-Kamysz	13 December 2023 – current
Donald Tusk (Third Cabinet)	Krzysztof Gawkowski	13 December 2023 – current
Donald Tusk (Third Cabinet)	Radosław Sikorski	24 July 2025 – current
Donald Tusk (Third Cabinet)	Andrzej Domański	20 November 2026 - current

== Notes and references ==
Notes
