= Józef Tejchma =

Polish politician (1927–2021)

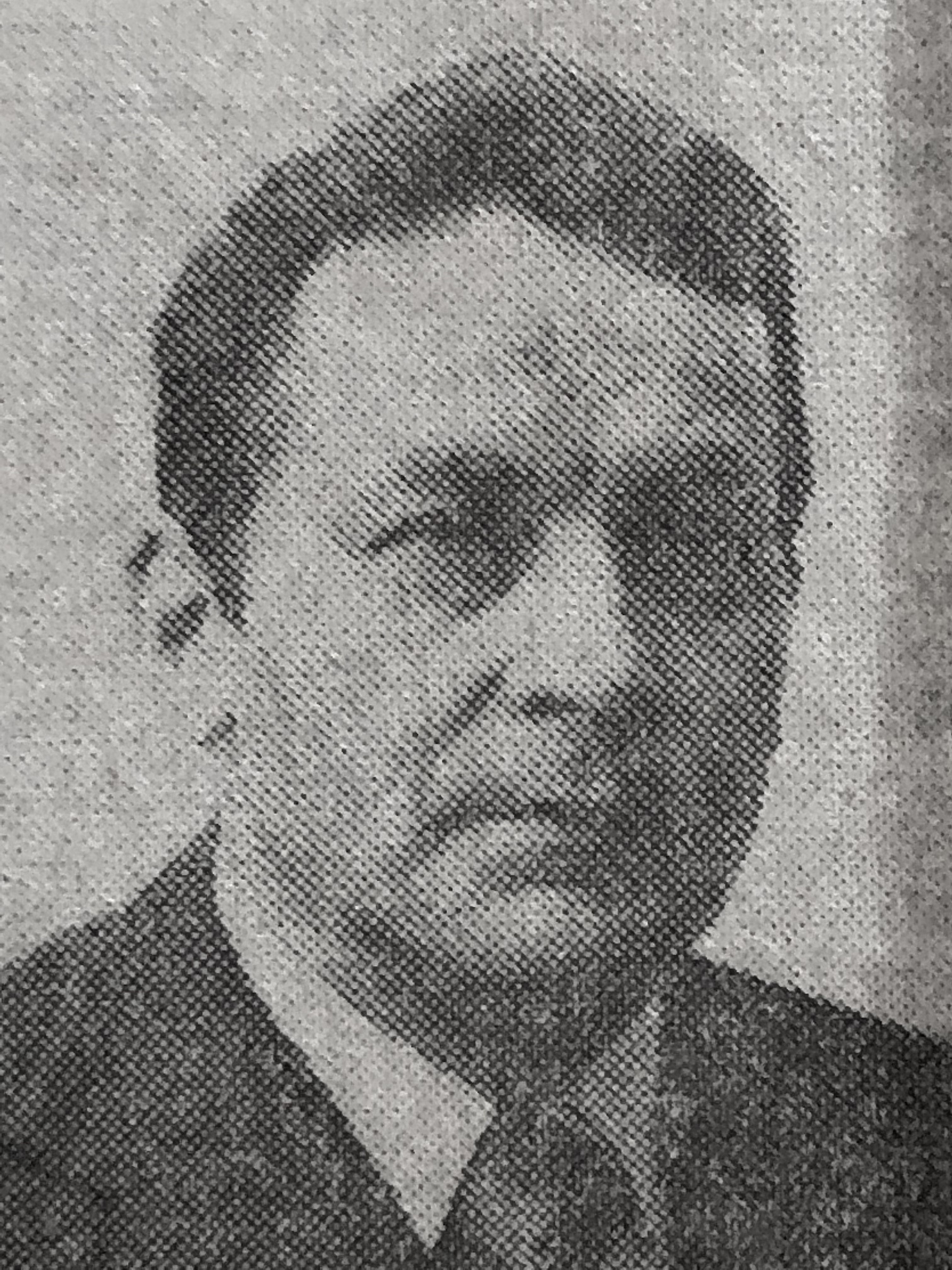
- Tejchma in 1975

Deputy Prime Minister of Poland
- In office 29 March 1972 – 25 March 1976
- Preceded by: Kazimierz Olszewski
- Succeeded by: Tadeusz Pyka

Minister of Culture and Art
- In office 8 October 1980 – 9 October 1982
- Prime Minister: Edward Babiuch; Józef Pińkowski; Wojciech Jaruzelski
- Preceded by: Zygmunt Najdowski
- Succeeded by: Kazimierz Żygulski
- In office 16 February 1974 – 26 January 1978
- Prime Minister: Piotr Jaroszewicz
- Preceded by: Stanisław Wroński
- Succeeded by: Janusz Wilhelmi

Minister of Education and Behavior
- In office 8 February 1979 – 2 April 1980
- Prime Minister: Piotr Jaroszewicz; Edward Babiuch
- Preceded by: Jerzy Kuberski
- Succeeded by: Krzysztof Kruszewski

Member of the Sejm
- In office 5 November 1958 – 18 February 1980

Personal details
- Born: 14 July 1927 Markowa, Poland
- Died: 13 December 2021 (aged 94) Warsaw, Poland
- Party: PZPR

Józef Tejchma (14 July 1927 – 13 December 2021) was a Polish communist politician. A member of the Polish United Workers' Party (PZPR), he served in the Sejm from 1957 to 1980 and was Deputy Prime Minister from 1972 to 1980.
