= Administrative reform in Poland (1975) =

The administrative reform of 1975 in Poland (Polish: Reforma administracyjna Polski w 1975 roku) was a major administrative reform in the Polish People's Republic which began in 1973 and completed in 1975. The Act of May 28, 1975 introduced a two-level administrative division in Poland. The reform was the final stage of subsequent administrative changes that had taken place since the liquidation of communes and the introduction of communes in their place at the end of 1954. The gradual elimination of population-, economically, infrastructurally and developmentally weak communities began in the late 1950s and continued in stages throughout the 1960s. In the early 1970s, much larger and significantly reduced in number clusters increasingly resembled communes, which were finally reactivated on January 1, 1973 (e.g. the list of clusters of Gostyń and Włodawa counties on January 1, 1971, was the same as the list of communes on January 1, 1973), simultaneously liquidating clusters and housing estates. In total, instead of 4,315 municipalities, 2,366 much larger communes were created on January 1, 1973. This number was reduced in subsequent years to 2,129 (2 July 1976).

== History ==
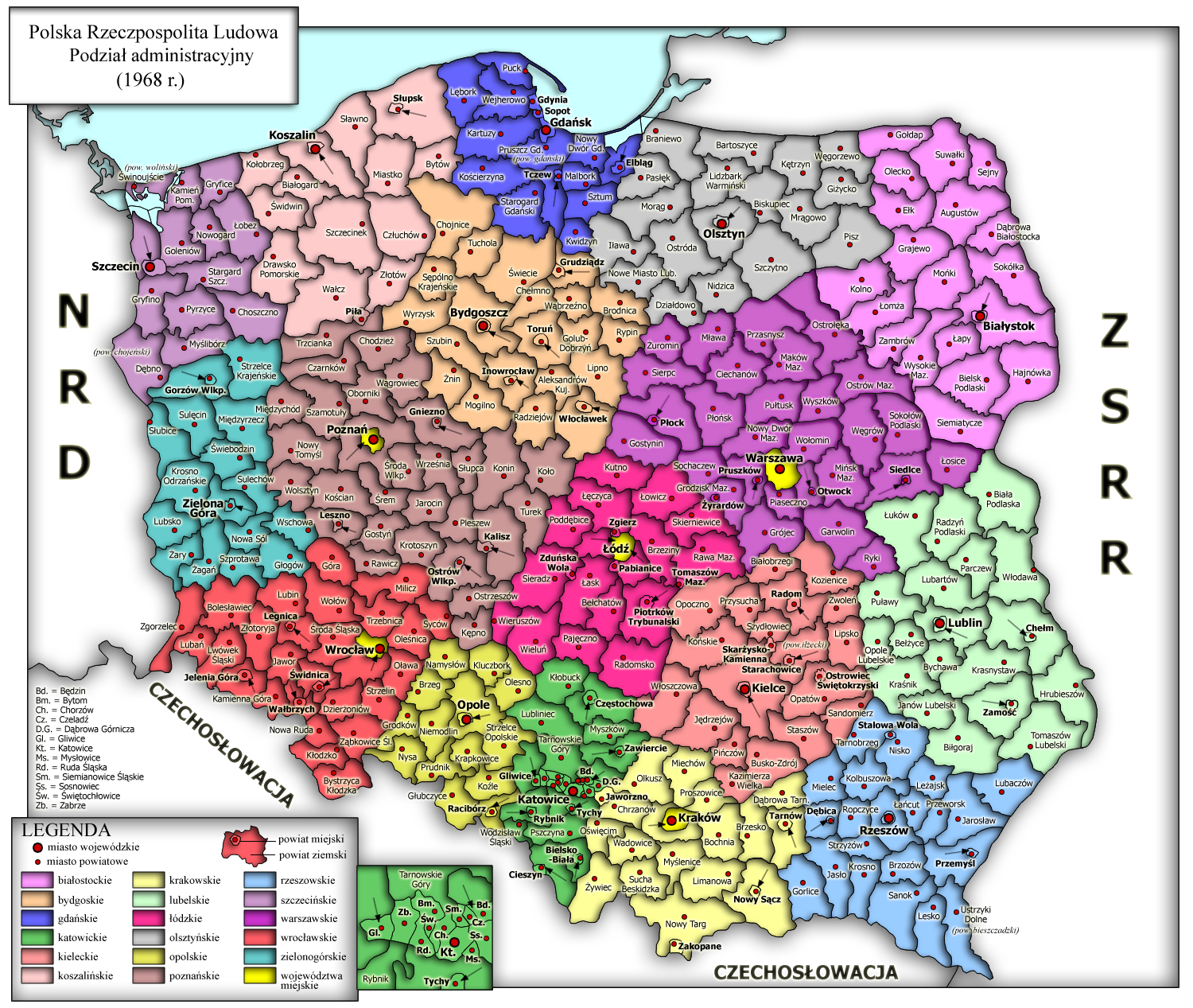
Administrative division of Poland from 1950 to 1975

Changes at the district level began with the establishment at the end of 1972 of the largest district in Poland - the Bieszczady district, created from three consolidated districts (Leski, Ustrzycki and Sanok); an urban district was also established in Sanok. At the beginning of 1973, the Wolin poviat was abolished and an urban poviat was created in Świnoujście, and at the end of 1973 urban poviats in Konin and Stargard Szczeciński. In December of that year, the Niżański poviat was also renamed the Stalowa Wola County, and the Iłża poviat was renamed the Starachowice Poviat. In the years 1973–1975, a major campaign was carried out to connect (or merge) administrative units (both cities and communes) to larger neighboring urban centers. This resulted in a significant reduction of some powiats in terms of administration (the most drastic example was the Tychy poviat with 16 units, which on the eve of the reform consisted of only three urban enclaves). In the period from January 2, 1972, to January 1, 1973, 13 cities were abolished (16 were created), 54 housing estates and 4 districts in Krakow (2 were created); the name of two towns (Boguszów and Szczawnica) was also changed. In 1975, by the time the reform was introduced, an additional 26 cities were abolished.

By the Act of November 22, 1973 amending the Act on National Councils, the presidiums of national councils, as collegial bodies, were replaced by single-person bodies (voivode (Polish: Wojewoda), city president (Polish: Prezydent miasta), head of a commune (Polish: naczelnik gminy) or city district (Polish: naczelnik dzielnicy). The voivode, the city president, the head of the powiat, the head of a city constituting a powiat and the head of a district in a city excluded from the voivodeship were appointed by the Prime Minister, after obtaining the opinion of the candidates by the relevant National Council. However, the head of a city not constituting a powiat, the head of a district in a city constituting a powiat and the head of a commune were appointed by the voivode after obtaining the opinion of the candidates by the competent national council. Vice-voivodes and vice-presidents of cities excluded from voivodeships were appointed by the Prime Minister. The appointment of voivode, city president, head of a poviat, city, city district and commune and their deputies was for an indefinite period. Persons were dismissed from these positions by the authorities competent to appoint them to these positions. Supervision over the activities of local state administration bodies was exercised by the Council of Ministers, the Prime Minister and local higher-level administration bodies. In 1975, further significant changes took place in Poland in the structure of local administration bodies. By the Act of May 28, 1975 on the two-level administrative division of the state and amending the Act on national councils, communes, cities and districts of larger cities became units of basic administrative division, and voivodeships and cities with voivodeship rights were established as second-level units: Warsaw, Kraków, Łódź and Wrocław. As a result of the introduction of a two-stage territorial division of the country, 314 counties and 76 cities with county rights were abolished.

After the elections to the national councils on December 9, 1973, single-person management was introduced in the administration at all levels, restoring the functions of voivodes and presidents in cities with over 50,000 inhabitants. The actual power was exercised by the heads of the Polish United Workers' Party, who were also in most cases the chairmen of the voivodeship national councils (Polish: Wojewódzka rada narodowa. The Polish United Workers' Party was a kind of super-office deciding on the decisions of councilors. In their activities, the councilors were to be guided by the guidelines contained in the Declaration of the First National Conference of the Polish United Workers' Party - on the role and tasks of National Councils in the socio-political system of the Polish People's Republic. The provisions of the Polish United Workers' Party have therefore become a general guideline for the directions of strengthening the so-called socialist democracy.

Poland administrative division following the 1975 reform

The next stage of the administrative reform assumed the introduction of a two-stage administrative division of the state and the liquidation of counties that had existed since the 14th century. It was kept secret from a wider group of party activists. Prime Minister Piotr Jaroszewicz and Secretary of the Central Committee of the Polish United Workers' Party, Edward Babiuch, were responsible for preparing the new division. The work was completed in early 1975. In March 1975, the project was assessed by the Political Bureau, which proposed the creation of 50 voivodeships, including two "city voivodeships" (Polish: Województwa miejskie) - Warsaw and Łódź. Initially, some voivodeships were to have names referring to geographical regions, such as the Beskid voivodeship (with its seat in Bielsko-Biała), the Bieszczady voivodeship (Krosno), the Kurpie voivodeship (Ostrołęka) and the Podhale voivodeship (Nowy Sącz).

The original date of the reform was to be October 1, 1975. However, in March, a modified project was submitted to the Politburo for discussion, including 47 voivodeships, which did not include the Chełm, Chojnice and Nowy Sącz voivodeships. In some voivodeships, disputes arose over the capital; in the Sandomierz Voivodeship, Sandomierz, Tarnobrzeg and Stalowa Wola claimed the seat of power, and in the voivodeship planned in the Copper Basin, Legnica and Lubin competed for the capital. The shape of the province was also decided. Krakow, which, like Łódź and Warsaw, received municipal status. Finally, on April 22, the Political Bureau of the Central Committee accepted 49 voivodeships. Then, due to the reported disputes and dissatisfaction in some local centers, the authorities decided to accelerate legislative work, and as a result, on May 28, the Sejm passed the Act amending the Constitution and the two-level administrative division of the state, which entered into force on June 1, 1975.

In place of the counties and 17 voivodeships that existed until May 31, 1975, 49 voivodeships were created and operated until December 31, 1998. In the light of the cited Act of May 28, 1975, the local state administration bodies were:

- in a voivodeship – voivode (Polish: Wojewoda);
- in the capital and city voivodeships – the president of the city (Polish: Prezydent miasta);
- in the Wrocław Voivodeship and the city of Wrocław – voivode (Polish: Wojewoda);
- in a city with a population of over 50,000 inhabitants and in the city being the seat of the provincial national council - the president of the city (Polish: Prezydent miasta), and in the city up to 50,000 residents – city chief (Polish: Naczelnik miasta);
- in a city district – district head;

On June 1, 1975, 392 poviats were abolished (including 78 urban ones), and instead of 17 voivodeships and 5 separate cities (Warsaw, Łódź, Kraków, Wrocław and Poznań), a new administrative division into 49 voivodeships was introduced. In addition to voivodeships, administrative units of voivodeship level also included the capital city of Warsaw and the cities of Kraków and Łódź, which resulted in the official designation of the Warsaw Voivodeship as the capital and the Kraków and Łódź Voivodeships as urban. In addition to communes (Polish: Gmina), as basic units, there were also districts (Polish: Dzielnicy) in larger cities. What was characteristic of the administrative division resulting from the reform was that only a few voivodeships had more than 1 million inhabitants and the fact that in many cases the capitals of the new voivodeships were medium-sized or small provincial towns. 12 capitals had fewer than 40,000 inhabitants, including 8 with less than 30,000. The smallest provincial city, Sieradz, had only 20,934 inhabitants. Four cities were not even the largest in the voivodeship: Sieradz (compared to Zduńska Wola, which was almost twice as large), Tarnobrzeg (compared to Stalowa Wola, which was 13,000 larger), Skierniewice (compared to Żyrardów, which was 8,000 larger) and Suwałki (compared to Ełk). Moreover, Krosno had a similar population as Sanok, located more centrally in the voivodeship.

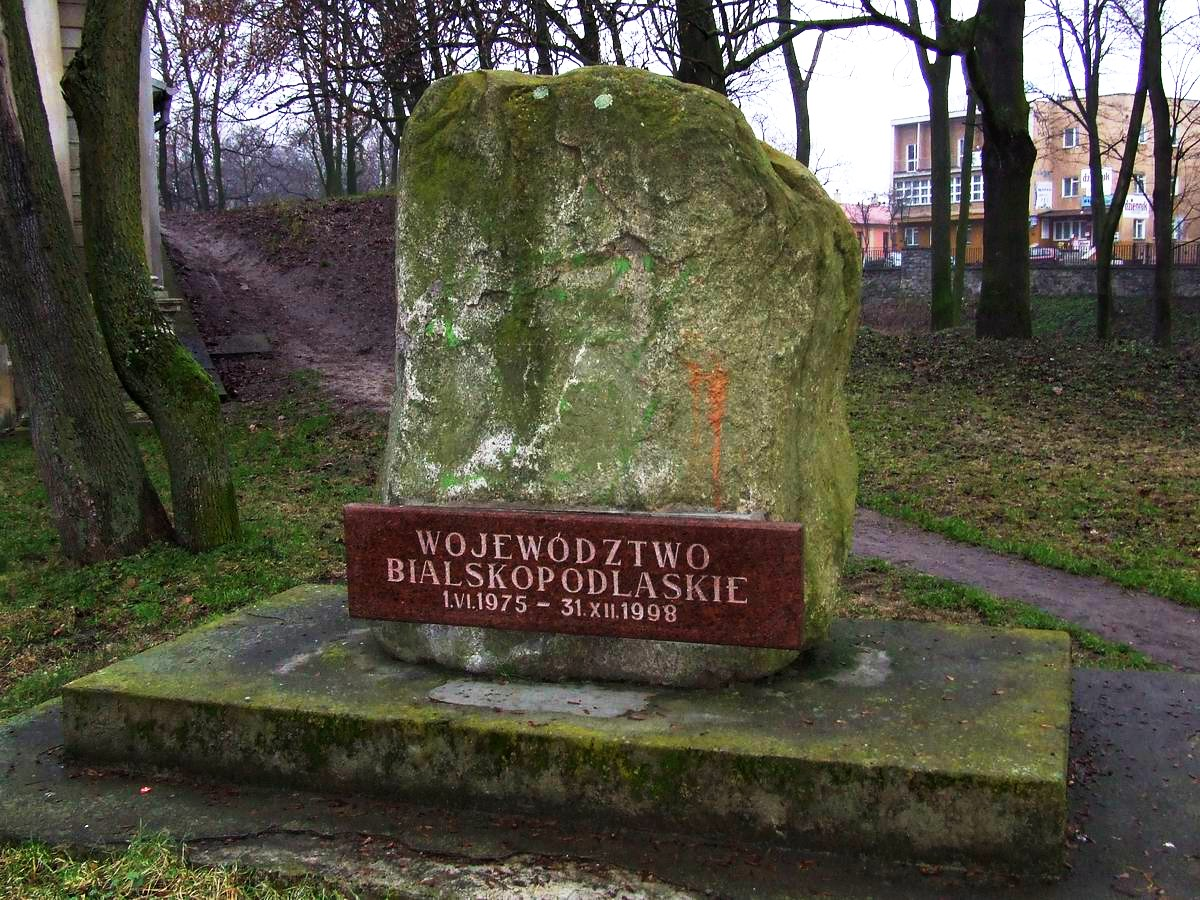
The symbolic "grave" of the Biała Podlaska Voivodeship in Biała Podlaska.

The official goal of the reform was to adapt the administrative division to the needs of Poland's accelerated socio-economic development, better meet the growing needs of society and improve the management of the national economy and the functioning of state authorities and administration. However, the real reason could have been the fear of the central authorities in Warsaw of the existing voivodeships growing in economic and administrative strength, which in turn could have influenced their becoming independent from the headquarters. Nevertheless, the changes introduced during the 1973-1975 administrative reform, were in fact identical to the process of centralization of power, because an informal principle was adopted that the chairmen of the provincial national councils were to be the first secretaries of the provincial committees of the Polish United Workers' Party. In particular, the fear of the power of the largest, densely populated and highly industrialized voivodeships (Warsaw, Łódź, Kraków) resulted in the seemingly illogical creation of the smallest voivodeships around the largest cities. This thesis was supported by, among others, Minister of Culture and Art Józef Tejchma, Gierek's opponent, who wrote in his diary "the real intention is to create such an administrative and personnel system that there are no strong people anywhere outside the Central Committee building".

Contrary to official declarations, the actual effect of the reform was the centralization of management, because weak centers were dependent on the good will of the center of power in many respects. At the same time, numerous towns that were previously district towns were degraded. According to the communist authorities, the liquidation of counties was necessary because they hindered the development of the country. The changes introduced were already subject to criticism. The borders of the new voivodeships were drawn contrary to the existing boundaries of counties and regions, which resulted in the destruction of local social, economic and cultural structures shaped in the historical process. Some counties were divided between three or four voivodeships. The reform resulted in significant expenses related to, among others: with the construction of the seats of new Provincial Committees of the Polish United Workers' Party, voivodeship offices, courts, prosecutor's offices and provincial commands of the Milicja Obywatelska.

Ultimately, this administrative division was abolished with the next reform, which entered into force on January 1, 1999
