= Stefan Jędrychowski =

Polish politician and journalist (1910–1996)

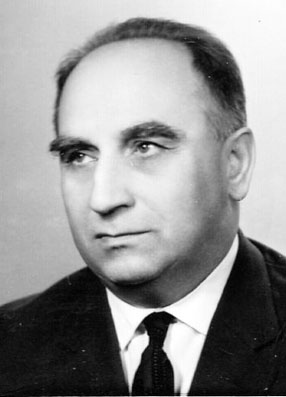

Minister of Finance of Poland
- In office 22 December 1971 – 21 November 1974
- Prime Minister: Piotr Jaroszewicz
- Preceded by: Józef Trendota
- Succeeded by: Henryk Kisiel

Minister of Foreign Affairs
- In office 22 December 1968 – 22 December 1971
- Prime Minister: Józef Cyrankiewicz; Piotr Jaroszewicz
- Preceded by: Adam Rapacki
- Succeeded by: Stefan Olszowski

Deputy Prime Minister
- In office 12 December 1951 – 24 October 1956
- Preceded by: Hilary Chełchowski
- Succeeded by: Tadeusz Gede

Personal details
- Born: 19 May 1910 Warsaw, Congress Poland, Russian Empire
- Died: 26 May 1996 (aged 86) Warsaw, Poland
- Party: Soviet Communist Party; Polish United Workers' Party
- Education: Stefan Batory University
- Profession: Politician, economist, journalist

Stefan Jędrychowski (19 May 1910 – 26 May 1996) was a Polish communist politician, economist, and journalist, who served as deputy prime minister, minister of foreign affairs, and minister of finance.

== Early life and education ==
Jędrychowski was born on 19 May 1910 in Warsaw to a middle-class Catholic family. His mother was of German origin. His family owned properties and apartment houses in Wilno, in the Russian part of Poland.

Jędrychowski graduated from Stefan Batory University in Wilno in 1932 with degrees in law and social science. He went on to earn his master's degree in law and PhD in economics from the same university. He began his political career as a radical leftist in a group called the Renaissance (Polish: Odrodzenie) as an undergraduate student. He went on to join the Legion of Youth (Polish: Legion Mlodych), which was founded by Józef Piłsudski after he took over the Polish government in 1926. Jędrychowski became a member of the group's regional command.

== Career and activities ==
Jędrychowski began his career as an assistant lecturer in economics at Stefan Batory University. In 1936, he joined the Communist Party. In September 1939, he began to work as a journalist in Wilno. Then he was named deputy editor of the local communist daily which had been published by the Soviet authorities. He became a Soviet citizen and a member of the Soviet Communist Party. Following the annexation of Lithuania to the Soviet Union he served at the Supreme Soviet of the Supreme Soviet as a deputy.

Later Jędrychowski continued his activities in the Polish Committee of National Liberation (PKWN), which was formed on 22 July 1944. Shortly after he began to serve as the PKWN's representative in Moscow. He was also the Warsaw government's delegate in France in 1945. In addition, he headed the department of information and propaganda under the PKWN. From 1945 to 1947 he served as minister of navigation and foreign trade in the national unity government. Next he joined the Polish United Workers' Party. And he became an alternate member of the party's central committee or politburo.

Jędrychowski served as the vice president or deputy prime minister at the Polish cabinet, also known as Rada Ministrów, from 12 December 1951 to 24 October 1956. He worked as the head of the planning office, Komisja Planowania, from 1956 to 1971. He was also promoted to the full membership of the party's central committee on 21 October 1956, being one of nine members. At the committee he assumed the post of chief economic advisor. He served as the minister of foreign affairs from 22 December 1968 to 22 December 1971. In December 1971, his membership at the central committee of the party ended. Next he was named minister of finance on 22 December 1971, and his term ended on 21 November 1974.

== Death ==
Jędrychowski died in Warsaw on 26 May 1996.

== Awards and decorations ==
- Order of the Builders of People's Poland (1964)
- Order of the Banner of Labour, 1st Class (1950)
- Commander's Cross with Star of Order of Polonia Restituta
- Order of the Cross of Grunwald, 3rd Class (1946)
- Golden Medal of Merit for National Defence (1973)
- Silver Medal of Merit for National Defence
- Bronze Medal of Merit for National Defence
- Medal of Ludwik Waryński (1986)
- Badge of the 1000th Anniversary of the Polish State (1966)
- Grand Cross of Order of the Dannebrog (Denmark, 1949))
- Order of Merits for the People with Golden Star (Yugoslavia, 1946))
- Grand Officer of Order of Merit of the Italian Republic (Italy, 1965))
- Order of the Red Banner of Labour (USSR, 1967)
- Jubilee Medal "In Commemoration of the 100th Anniversary of the Birth of Vladimir Ilyich Lenin" (USSR, 1969)
