= Mieczysław Jagielski =

Polish politician (1924–1997)

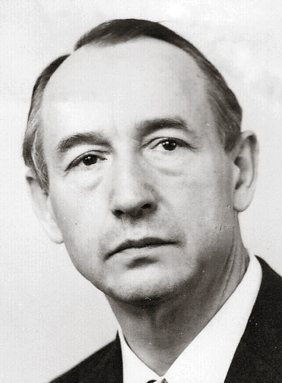

Member of the Politburo of the Polish United Workers' Party
- In office December 1971 – July 1981
- Prime Minister: Piotr Jaroszewicz, Edward Babiuch, Józef Pińkowski, Wojciech Jaruzelski

Deputy Prime Minister of the People's Republic of Poland
- In office 20 June 1970 – 31 July 1981
- Prime Minister: Józef Cyrankiewicz, Piotr Jaroszewicz, Edward Babiuch, Józef Pińkowski, Wojciech Jaruzelski

Minister of Agriculture
- In office 27 October 1959 – 30 June 1970
- Prime Minister: Józef Cyrankiewicz

Member of the Central Committee of the Polish United Workers' Party
- In office March 1959 – July 1981
- Prime Minister: Józef Cyrankiewicz, Piotr Jaroszewicz, Edward Babiuch, Józef Pińkowski, Wojciech Jaruzelski

Deputy to the Sejm
- In office 20 February 1957 – 31 August 1985
- Prime Minister: Józef Cyrankiewicz, Piotr Jaroszewicz, Edward Babiuch, Józef Pińkowski, Wojciech Jaruzelski

Personal details
- Born: 12 January 1924 Kolomyia, Stanisławów Voivodeship, Poland
- Died: 27 February 1997 (age 73) Warsaw, Poland
- Party: Polish United Workers' Party
- Occupation: Politician; Economist

Mieczysław Zygmunt Jagielski (12 January 1924 – 27 February 1997) was a Polish politician and economist. During the times of the People's Republic of Poland he was the last leading politician from the former eastern regions of pre-Second World War Poland.

Jagielski became a communist deputy to the legislative body of Poland, the Sejm, in 1957, and he would continue to serve in that capacity for seven consecutive terms until 1985. In 1959, he was posted to be a member of the Central Committee of the Polish United Workers' Party and appointed to be the Minister of Agriculture. After he left his position as Minister of Agriculture in 1970, Jagielski became a Deputy Prime Minister and, the next year, a member of the Politburo of the Polish United Workers' Party. In August 1980, Jagielski represented the government during talks with strikers in the city of Gdańsk. He negotiated the agreement, which recognized Solidarity, a Polish trade union, as the first officially recognized independent trade union within the Eastern Bloc. Between August 1980 and August 1981, Jagielski continued to interact with representatives of Polish workers, though his health was declining during this period. In late July 1981, Jagielski was fired from the Deputy Premiership, reportedly because he failed to produce a recovery program for the economic crisis Poland was experiencing at that time. The same year, he left his membership of the Political Bureau of the Polish United Workers' Party and the Central Committee. He died in Warsaw, Poland, from a heart attack at the age of 73.

== Early political career ==
Jagielski was born to a peasant family on 12 January 1924, in Kołomyja, Poland (Second Polish Republic) (now Kolomyia, Ukraine). He spent the Second World War as an agricultural laborer on the farm of his parents. After the war he finished studies at the Main School of Planning and Statistics as well as in the Instytut Kształcenia Kadr Naukowych (Institute of Preparing Science Cadres), the latter being a graduate school preparing people for prominent positions in the Polish communist party structures.

Jagielski signed up for the Polish Workers' Party (PPR) in 1944, or in 1946 (sources vary). When the Polish Worker's Party transformed into the Polish United Workers' Party (PZPR) in 1948, he became a member of the new party. From 1946 to 1949, Jagielski served on the Central Board of the Związek Samopomocy Chłopskiej (Association of Peasant Self-Help), a communist organization designed to take control of the countryside. From 1950 to 1952 he was on the Central Board of the State Agricultural Farms and from December 1952 to December 1953 he was a deputy director of that institution. In December 1953, he became the Director of the Agricultural Department of the Central Committee of the Polish United Workers' Party, a position he would hold until December 1956.

In March 1954, he became a deputy to a member of the Central Committee of the Polish United Workers' Party and would retain this position until March 1959. As a result of the January 1957 Polish legislative elections, Jagielski was appointed as a deputy to the Sejm, the Polish legislative body. In January that year, he also became the Deputy Minister of Agriculture and was appointed as the Minister of Agriculture in October 1959, a position he would hold until June 1970. In March 1959, he was appointed a full member of the Central Committee of the Polish United Workers' Party (he was previously a deputy to a full member). In June 1964, he became a deputy to a member of the Politburo of the Polish United Workers' Party and would hold that position until December 1971.

Jagielski was also an economist, specializing in issues of agricultural economics. Beginning in 1975, he held a professorship in the Main School of Planning and Statistics in Warsaw.

== Deputy Prime Minister ==
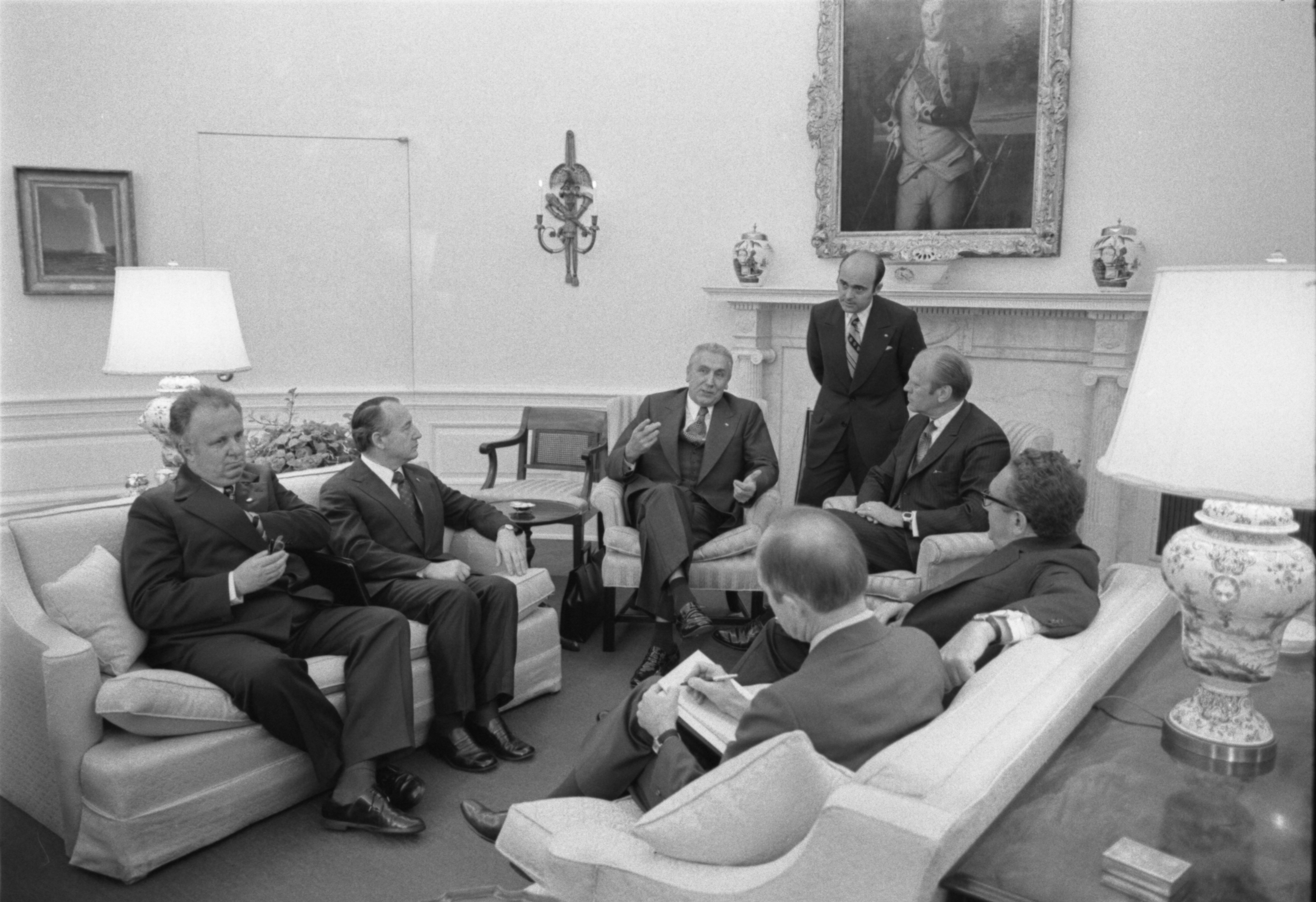
Photograph of President Gerald Ford Meeting with Edward Gierek, First Secretary of the Central Committee of the Polish United Workers' Party (PZPR), in the Oval Office. Deputy Prime Minister Mieczyslaw Jagielski, Minister of Foreign Affairs of the Polish People's Republic Stefan Olszowski, Secretary of State Henry Kissinger, National Security Advisor Lt. Gen. Brent Scowcroft, and interpreter Henryk Sokalski.

In June 1970, Jagielski was appointed as a Deputy Prime Minister (thus ending his tenure as the Minister of Agriculture and becoming the Deputy of the Council of Ministers of the Republic of Poland), and in December 1971 he became a full member of the Politburo of the Polish United Workers' Party (he was previously a deputy to an existing member). On 26 October 1971, he became the Chairman of the Planning Committee of the Council of Ministers. On 23 October 1975, he was relieved of his post as the Chairman of the Planning Committee after he suffered a severe heart attack. From 1971 to 1981 he was the Polish representative in the Comecon. In February 1981 he became the president of the Economy Committee at the Council of Ministers.

He is described as having a "profound influence" on Poland's economic policies between 1971 and 1975, when he lost his position as Chairman of the Planning Committee. On 1 July 1980, the Polish government announced price increases, which led to many workers striking in several Polish cities, including Lublin. As a result of the strike in Lublin, the city was "virtually shut down", and Jagielski led a delegation to the city, which was able to ease tension there.

=== Gdańsk negotiations ===
Gdańsk became the focal point of the strike movement. On 21 August 1980, Mieczysław Jagielski replaced Tadeusz Pyka to lead a Polish government commission which was negotiating with strikers there. The strikers were represented by the Inter-Enterprise Strike Committee, which was demanding that the workers it represented be given better rights, including better rights to strike. On 26 August meeting with representatives of the strikers at the Lenin Shipyard in Gdańsk, Jagielski promised that the right to strike would be added to a new law on the official trade unions of Poland. After 5 more days of difficult negotiations, a settlement was reached between the strikers and the government, known as the Gdańsk agreement. Norman Davies contends that Jagielski "in the end realised that only two alternatives remained [to a general government victory in the negotiations]-either agreement on the strikers' terms or an immediate resort to force for which the government was not prepared." The agreement, as well as giving the workers of the Lenin Shipyard the right to strike, also allowed them to form their own independent trade union. Jagielski said of the negotiations that led to the agreement, "We have spoken as Poles to Poles...There are no winners and losers. The important thing here is that we have understood each other and the best guarantee for what we have done is hard work." He was reported to have spoken eloquently.

Nobody informed me of the scope of my competences. All I heard was: "Go and extinguish the social conflict. And as soon as possible because the situation is very serious". [...]

I remember the first encounter, the unfriendly shouts, the banging on the coach that brought us there. [...] I could feel that hostility. That was horrific. With acute heart arrhythmia, I had to represent the authorities with dignity.

— Jagielski recalls how he felt at one point during 23 August 1980, about the strikers at Gdańsk, and the task he had of negotiating with them.

=== After the Gdańsk negotiations ===
In October 1980, he interacted with a delegation of Solidarity members that included Lech Wałęsa, future President of the Third Republic of Poland. When Wałęsa complained that the Polish government was not keeping to its promise of allowing the independent labour movement enough of an opportunity to publicize itself, Jagielski indicated that he would try to give the movement better access to the Polish press, and to the Polish radio network. Jagielski led a delegation that went to a meeting in Moscow of Comecon, the Eastern Bloc economic community, during January 1981. That month, the government declared that the poor economy was forcing it to cut back on its promise of ensuring that Polish workers did not have to work on Saturdays, and that it would offer a number of Saturdays as work-free instead.

Unrest grew among Polish workers over the government's decision, and Jagielski negotiated with Wałęsa for six hours in the building of the Council of Ministers regarding the Saturday issue. Other talking points included Solidarity's exemptions from standard state censorship. The negotiations did not end the unrest, and Jagielski offered a compromise in an appearance on the Polish national television network, stating that the government would grant workers every other Saturday off, or give them all Saturdays free but add half an hour to each working day. He warned that Poland's economic troubles would increase should all Polish workers gain all Saturdays off from work, and he appealed to "the patriotism of the people". Many Polish workers, though, stayed off work the following Saturday. In April Jagielski, described as a "veteran negotiator", met with France's President Valéry Giscard d'Estaing, and he was able to gain a pledge of $800 million in aid from France. That month, he was received by the United States's Secretary of State Alexander Haig and Vice President George H. W. Bush, and they promised Jagielski that the US would sell Poland 50,000 tons of surplus butter and dried milk and would consider cooperating on rescheduling Poland's $3 billion debt to the US.

On 10 June as a member of the Politburo of the Polish United Workers' Party, Jagielski offered to other members of that group to terminate his position within the Politburo, and his position as Deputy Prime Minister, stating, "I submit my resignation as a member of the PB (Politburo), especially since I had a certain incident in my life. I also submit my resignation as vice premier (Deputy Prime Minister)." It seems his offer was rebuffed, and the incident in his life that he spoke of may have been a heart attack he had recently suffered. On 31 July 1981, Jagielski was fired from his position as Deputy Prime Minister, reportedly because he failed to produce a recovery program for the economic crisis Poland was experiencing at the time.

== Later life and death ==
In July 1981, Jagielski lost his memberships in the Central Committee of the Polish United Workers' Party, the Politburo of the Polish United Workers and the Economic Committee. He remained a deputy to the Sejm until 1985. He died on the night of 27 February 1997, from a heart attack in his home, in Warsaw, Poland, at the age of 73. After Jagielski's death, Lech Wałęsa described him as a "sensitive man who always listened to arguments", and said that Jagielski differed in that respect from other Polish politicians in 1980.

== Awards ==
- Order of the Builders of People's Poland (1969)
- Order of the Banner of Labour, 1st Class (1964)
- Order of the Banner of Labour, 2nd Class
- Commander's Cross of the Order of Polonia Restituta
- Officer's Cross of the Order of Polonia Restituta
- Medal of the 30th Anniversary of People's Poland (1974)
- Gold Medal of Merit for National Defence (1973)
- Silver Medal of Merit for National Defence
- Bronze Medal of Merit for National Defence
- Badge of the 1000th Anniversary of the Polish State (1966)
- Grand Cross of the Order of Prince Henry (Portugal, 1976)
- 90th Anniversary of the Birth of Georgi Dimitrov Medal (Bulgaria, 1972)
- Jubilee Medal "In Commemoration of the 100th Anniversary of the Birth of Vladimir Ilyich Lenin" (USSR, 1969)
- Jubilee Medal "Thirty Years of Victory in the Great Patriotic War 1941–1945" (USSR, 1975)

== Bibliography ==
- Jagielski, Mieczysław (1957) O nowej polityce partii na wsi [On the new party's politic in the villages].
- Jagielski, Mieczysław (1965). Niektóre problemy rozwoju rolnictwa w latach 1966-1970 [Selected problems of agricultural development in the years 1966-1970].
