= Ozdowski =

Ozdowski is a Polish surname. Notable people with the surname include:

- Jerzy Ozdowski (1925–1994), Polish economist
- Mike Ozdowski (born 1955), American football player
- Sev Ozdowski (born 1949), Australian human rights advocate
