= Stefan Żółkiewski =

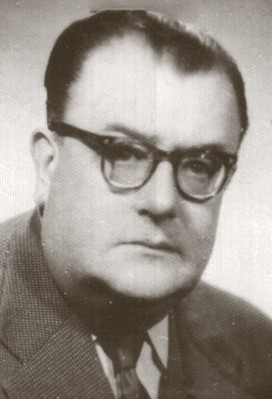

Minister of Higher Education
- In office 27 April 1956 – 18 June 1959
- Prime Minister: Józef Cyrankiewicz
- First Secretary: Edward Ochab (1956); Władysław Gomułka (1956–1959)
- Preceded by: Adam Rapacki
- Succeeded by: Henryk Golański

Personal details
- Born: Stefan Jakub Żółkiewski; 9 December 1911 Warsaw, Congress Poland, Russian Empire
- Died: 4 January 1991 (aged 79) Warsaw, Poland
- Resting place: Powązki Military Cemetery
- Party: Polish United Workers' Party

Stefan Jakub Żółkiewski (9 December 1911 – 4 January 1991) was a Polish theoretist, historian of literature and literary critic. He was born and died in Warsaw. He was a co-founder of the Polish Workers' Party, editor-in-chief of Kuźnica (1945–1948), Polityka (1957–1958), Minister of Higher Education (1956–1959), director and professor of Polish Academy of Sciences and professor of Warsaw University.

== Notable works ==
- Kultura, socjologia, semiotyka literacka
- Kultura literacka 1918–1932 (a monograph)
