= Władysław Wicha =

Polish politician

Minister of Interior
- In office 7 December 1954 – 12 December 1964
- Prime Minister: Józef Cyrankiewicz
- Succeeded by: Mieczysław Moczar

Member of the State Council
- In office 24 June 1965 – 27 June 1969

Personal details
- Born: 3 June 1904 Warsaw, Congress Poland, Russian Empire (today Poland)
- Died: 13 December 1984 (aged 80) Warsaw, Poland
- Resting place: Powązki Military Cemetery
- Citizenship: Poland
- Party: Polish United Workers' Party
- Awards

Władysław Wicha (born 3 June 1904 in Warsaw; died 13 December 1984 in Warsaw) was a Polish communist politician. Minister of Interior in the years 1954–1964, member of the Council of State (1965–1969), deputy to the Sejm of the Polish People's Republic of the first and fourth term.

== Biography ==
He was born into a working family and had secondary education as metallurgist. From 1924, he was a member of the Young Communist League of Poland, then an activist of the Communist Party of Poland, secretary of the district committees of the Warsaw-Lewa Podmiejska, Częstochowa-Piotrków, Łódź, Warsaw branches of the party. In the years 1938–1945 he worked as a metal worker in western Europe (Belgium, France, Spain and Great Britain).

In 1945 following the end of World War II, he returned to Poland, joined the Polish Workers' Party. He was the chairman of the Delegation of the Special Commission in Warsaw, deputy director of the Control Office at the State Council. From 1948 a member of the Polish United Workers' Party, the ruling communist party in the country. In the years 1949–1950, he was the first secretary of the Provincial Committee of the PZPR in Kielce, in the years 1950–1953 he was the first secretary of the Warsaw Committee. In the years 1954–1959 he was a member of the Central Audit Committee of the PZPR, in the years 1959–1968 he was a member of the Central Committee of PZPR, and in the years 1964–1968 secretary of the Central Committee. In the years 1952–1954 Undersecretary of State (Deputy Minister) in the Ministry of State Control and between the years 1954–1964 he served as the Minister of the Interior. In the years 1965–1969 a member of the State Council. He was a member of the Sejm of the first and fourth term of office. His wife was a KPP activist, Teofila née Lewin.

== Awards and decorations ==
- Order of the Banner of Labour, 1st Class (1964)
- Knight's Cross of the Order of Polonia Restituta (1947)
- Badge of the 1000th Anniversary of the Polish State (1966)
