= Cabinet of Waldemar Pawlak =

Cabinet of Waldemar Pawlak may refer to:

- First Cabinet of Waldemar Pawlak - from June 5, 1992, to July 10, 1992
- Second Cabinet of Waldemar Pawlak - from October 26, 1993, to March 1, 1995
