= Józef Kozioł =

Polish politician (1939–2023)

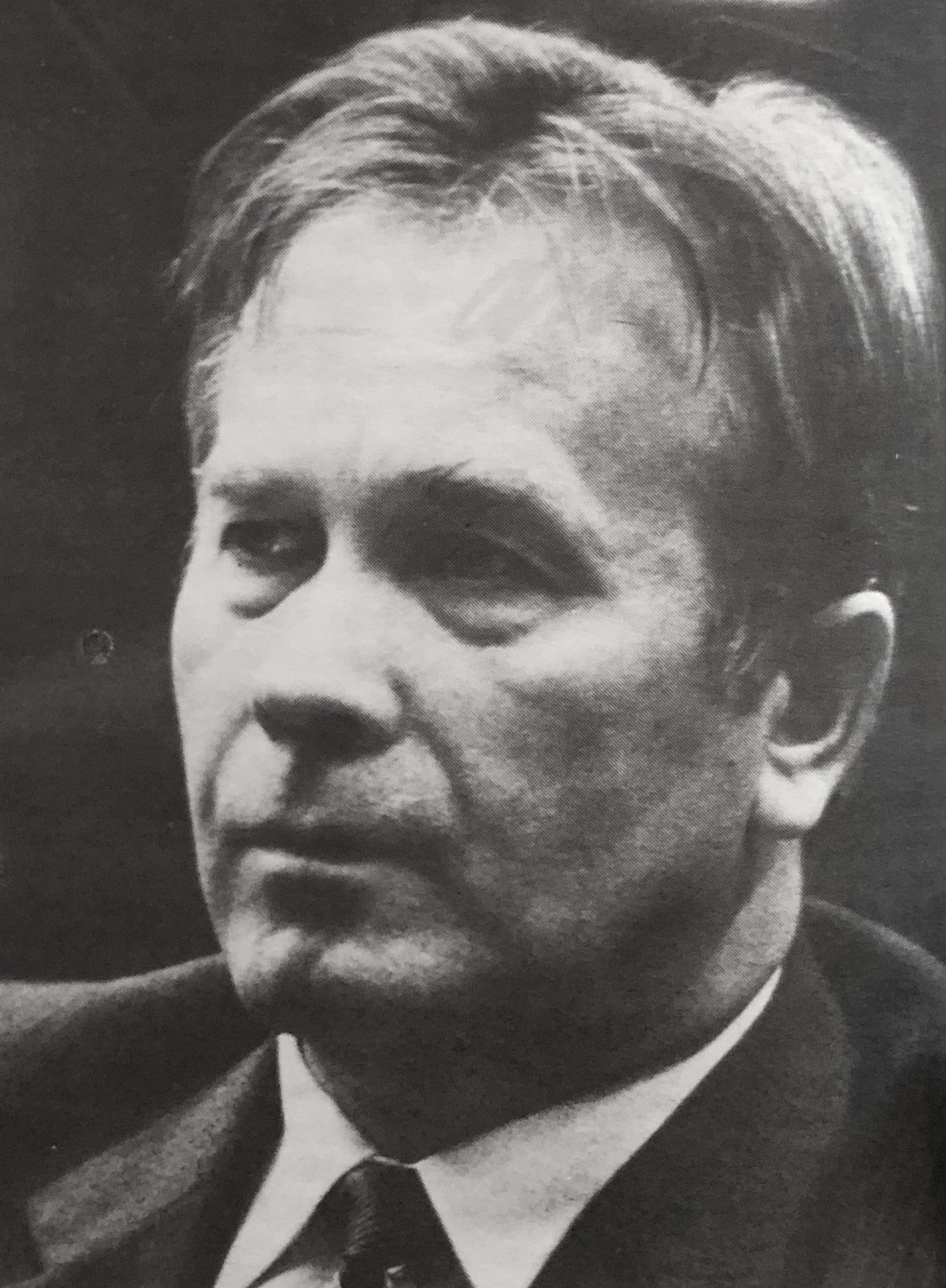
Józef Kozioł

Józef Kozioł (26 February 1939 – 30 June 2023) was a Polish politician and economist. He was an MP from 1985 to 1989, deputy prime minister from 1985 to 1988, and minister of the environmental protection and natural resources from 1988 to 1989.
