= Tadeusz Gede =

Polish politician (1911–1982)

Deputy Prime Minister
- In office June 30, 1952 – October 24, 1956

Minister of Foreign Trade
- In office March 7, 1949 – November 21, 1952
- Succeeded by: Konstanty Dąbrowski

Personal details
- Born: March 28, 1911 Tbilisi
- Died: March 4, 1982 (aged 70) Warsaw
- Party: Polish United Workers' Party

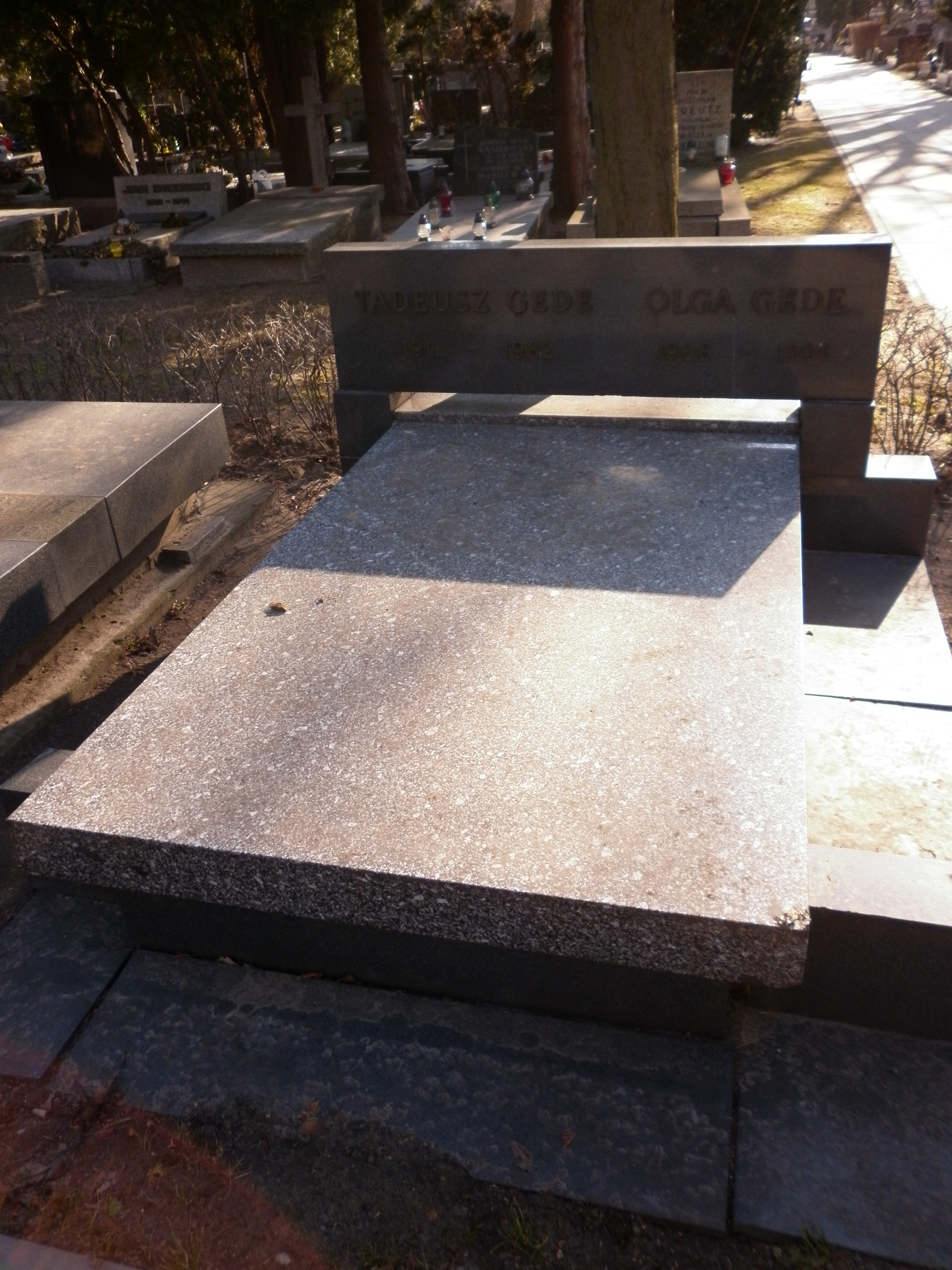
Grave of Tadeusz Gede and his wife Olga at the Powązki Military Cemetery in Warsaw

Tadeusz Gede (March 28, 1911 in Tbilisi - March 4, 1982 in Warsaw) was a Polish electrical engineer, diplomat, and politician. Member of the Sejm of the Polish People's Republic in the 1st, 3rd, and 4th convocations, Minister of Foreign Trade (1949–1952), and Deputy Prime Minister (1952–1956). Long-time ambassador and member of the Central Committee of the Polish United Workers' Party (PZPR).

== Biography ==
He was born on March 28, 1911, in Tbilisi, into the intellectual family of Otto and Stanisława. After graduating from high school, he began studies at the Warsaw University of Technology, which he completed in 1934.

In the Second Republic of Poland, he was active in the Independent Socialist Youth Association "Życie" (1932–1934) and the Young Communist League of Poland.

During the occupation, he lived in Warsaw. After the Warsaw Uprising, he worked as a farm worker in Radowiska in the Błonie district.

In 1945, he was the deputy head of the operational group "Pomorze" in Bydgoszcz on the orders of the Ministry of Industry and the head of the industrial department of the Provincial Office in Bydgoszcz. From 1945 to 1946, he was a delegate of the Ministry of Industry to Lower Silesia, from 1946 deputy director of the economic department, and then from 1947 director of the control department of the Ministry of Industry and Trade.

In 1945, he joined the Polish Workers' Party (PPR), and later the Polish United Workers' Party (PZPR). Successively, he held the positions of the Minister of Industry's delegate to Lower Silesia, director of the Economic and Social Department at the Ministry of Industry and Trade. From 1953 to 1971, he was a member of the Central Committee of the PZPR, and then until 1975 of the Central Revision Commission. He held a parliamentary seat in the PRL I, III, and IV terms, was the Minister of Foreign Trade from 1949 to 1952, and from 1952 to 1956, the Deputy Prime Minister. In the period from 1959 to 1968, he was the Deputy Chairman of the Planning Commission at the Council of Ministers.

From 1957 to 1959, he was the ambassador of Poland to the Soviet Union and Mongolia, and from December 16, 1968, to January 3, 1973, in East Germany.

He lived in Warsaw. He was married to Olga, née Wundr (1908–1996). The marriage had a daughter, Krystyna.

He died on March 4, 1982. The funeral of Tadeusz Gede on March 10, 1982, was attended, among others, by the deputy chairman of the State Council, Prof. Kazimierz Secomski, and Deputy Prime Minister Prof. Zbigniew Madej, who bid farewell to the deceased on behalf of the Polish government. In the name of friends, Franciszek Blinowski spoke. Buried at the Powązki Military Cemetery (section 32A-tuje-22).

== Awards and decorations ==
- Order of the Banner of Labour 1st class
- Commander's Cross with Star of the Order of Polonia Restituta (1964)
- Knight's Cross of the Order of Polonia Restituta (July 19, 1946)
- Medal of the 10th Anniversary of People's Poland (1955)
- Order of the National Flag I class (North Korea, 1954)

== Bibliography ==
- Tadeusz Gede, in: Tadeusz Mołdawa, People of Power 1944–1991, Warsaw 1991.
- Tadeusz Gede, in: Encyclopedia of Polish History, Warsaw 1995.
- Profile on the Sejm Library website.
- Information on the IPN BIP.
