= Zenon Nowak =

Polish politician (1905-1980)

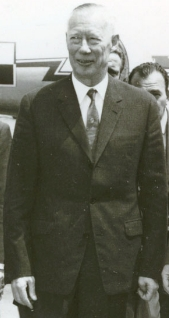

President of the Supreme Audit Office
- In office 28 June 1969 – 22 June 1971
- Preceded by: Konstanty Dąbrowski
- Succeeded by: Mieczysław Moczar

Deputy Prime Minister of Poland
- In office 20 November 1952 – 22 December 1968
- Prime Minister: Bolesław Bierut; Józef Cyrankiewicz

Personal details
- Born: 27 January 1905 Pabianice, Congress Poland, Russian Empire (present-day Poland)
- Died: 21 August 1980 (aged 75) Warsaw, Poland
- Party: Polish United Workers' Party (1924–1980)
- Other political affiliations: Communist Party of Poland; Polish Workers' Party

Zenon Nowak (27 January 1905 – 21 August 1980) was a Communist activist and politician in the People's Republic of Poland. He was one of the members of the pro-Soviet Natolin faction of the PZPR Central Committee during the Polish October of 1956.

== Awards and honors ==
- Polish People's Republic:
  - Order of the Builders of People's Poland (1964)
  - Order of the Banner of Labour, 1st class
  - Commander's Cross with Star of the Order of Polonia Restituta (1975)
  - Badge of the 1000th Anniversary of the Polish State (1966)
- Soviet Union:
  - Order of the October Revolution (1975)
  - Order of Friendship of Peoples

== See also ==
- Stalinism in Poland
- Poznań 1956 protests
