= Henryk Golański =

Polish electrical engineer, diplomat and politician

Henryk Golański (1 January 1908 – 13 June 1995) was a Polish electrical engineer, diplomat and politician, appointed as the Minister of Higher Education from 1959 to 1965 (presently Ministry of Science and Higher Education).

== Biography ==
Henryk Golański was born on 1 January 1908 in Łódź, a son of Franciszek and Maria Golański. He finished his studies at the Warsaw University of Technology. In the years 1932–1933, Golański was an engineer and manager of construction and assembly works at the Łódź Heat Power Stations and the Municipal Board in Lódź. He then served in the military as part of the staff at the Cadet Corps in Siedlce, obtaining a platoon rank.

From 1929 to 1932, Golański was a member of the Association of Independent Socialist Youth (ZNMS) "Życie". During 1934–1939, he worked as a designer at the State Tele and Radio Works in Warsaw. From 1939, he was also a member of the Union of Armed Struggle, and then the Home Army under the pseudonym "Marek". During the war, Golański was part of the resistance and participated in the Warsaw uprising, although in a minor role. This was not something to be proud of under Socialist Poland and, therefore, tended to be downplayed.

He died on 13 June 1995 in Warsaw.

== Politics ==
He joined the Polish Workers' Party in 1946, and would later belong to the Polish United Workers' Party. Between 1947 and 1949, Golański worked at the Ministry of Industry, from 1947 to 1949 at the Department of Industry and Trade, then at the Department of Light Industry as Undersecretary of State in 1950. Afterwards, he joined the Ministry of Higher Education (also as undersecretary of state from 1951). From 18 June 1959 to 14 December 1965, he served as a minister in the government of Józef Cyrankiewicz.

From 1966 to 1970 he was the ambassador of Poland to Greece.

== Honors ==
He was awarded the First Class Order of the Banner of Work in 1964.
