= First Premiership of Waldemar Pawlak =

Waldemar Pawlak was the only person to serve twice as Prime Minister of the Republic of Poland during the Third Republic period (1989–present) prior to the re-election of Donald Tusk in 2023.

His first premiership (5 June – 7 July 1992) was the briefest Government during this period, lasted only 33 days. This was, however, notable period, known commonly as Pawlak's 33 days (33 dni Pawlaka).

After the downfall of Jan Olszewski's cabinet, Pawlak, a leader of the agrarian Polish People's Party, was named new Prime Minister by President Lech Wałęsa with mission, to form a new coalition government included agrarians, Christian democrats and liberals.

However, Pawlak government failed to gain a support from Sejm majority and failed in a vote of confidence. He resigned and President replaced him by Hanna Suchocka, who won support from the majority.

Pawlak's first premiership and his role was and is widely viewed as caretaker administration, to give a new coalition time to form next government, after political disturbance after fall of the Olszewski government.

Because cabinet did not receive support from Sejm, at this time Pawlak had no official ministers, only temporary chiefs of executive branches.

Pawlak returned to Prime Minister office in 1993, this time as a head of the Polish People's Party-Democratic Left Alliance coalition. He served from 1993 to 1995.

== Pawlak's 1st government ==
- Waldemar Pawlak - Prime Minister
- Andrzej Milczanowski -Acting Minister of Internal Affairs
- Aleksander Łuczak - Acting Chief of the PM's chancellery
