= Zbigniew Szałajda =

Polish engineer and politician (1934–2024)

Minister of Metallurgy and Machinery Industry
- In office 10 July 1981 – 9 October 1982
- Preceded by: position established
- Succeeded by: Edward Łukosz

Minister of Metallurgy
- In office 8 October 1980 – 3 July 1981
- Preceded by: Franciszek Kaim
- Succeeded by: position abolished

Personal details
- Born: Zbigniew Karol Szałajda; 11 May 1934 Wilno, Poland (now Vilnius, Lithuania)
- Died: 5 May 2024 (aged 89)
- Party: PZPR
- Education: Silesian University of Technology
- Occupation: Engineer

Zbigniew Karol Szałajda (11 May 1934 – 5 May 2024) was a Polish engineer and politician. A member of the Polish United Workers' Party, he served as Minister of Metallurgy from 1980 to 1981 and Minister of Metallurgy and Machinery Industry from 1981 to 1982.

Szałajda died on 5 May 2024, at the age of 89.
