= Piotr Jaroszewicz =

Prime Minister of Poland from 1970 to 1980

General Piotr Jaroszewicz
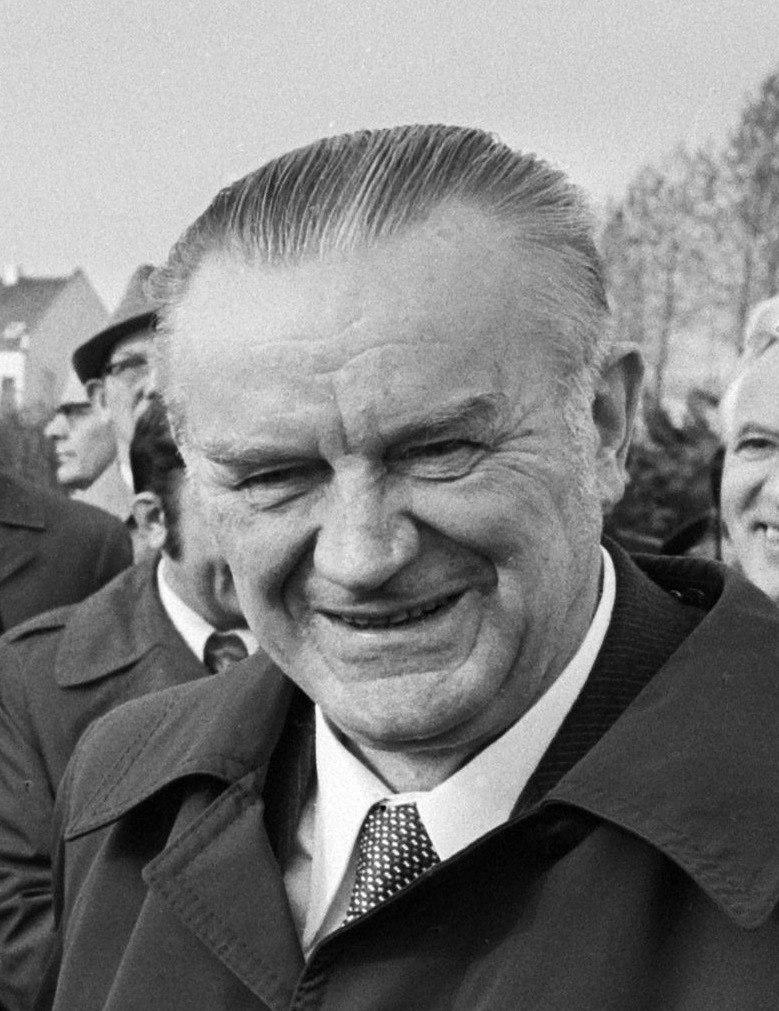
- Jaroszewicz in 1977

Prime Minister of Poland
- In office 23 December 1970 – 18 February 1980
- Deputy: See list: Mieczysław Jagielski Franciszek Kaim Jan Mitręga Kazimierz Olszewski Józef Tejchma Zdzisław Tomal Francziszek Szlachcic Alojzy Karkoszka Tadeusz Pyka Longin Cegielski Tadeusz Wrzaszczyk Józef Kępa Kazimierz Secomski Jan Szydlak
- Chairman: Józef Cyrankiewicz; Henryk Jabłoński
- First Secretary: Edward Gierek
- Counterparts in-exile: Zygmunt Muchniewski; Alfred Urbański; Kazimierz Sabbat
- Preceded by: Józef Cyrankiewicz
- Succeeded by: Edward Babiuch

Personal details
- Born: 8 October 1909 Nieśwież, Russian Empire (now Belarus)
- Died: 1 September 1992 (aged 82) Warsaw, Poland
- Cause of death: Assassination
- Party: Polish Workers' Party (until 1948); Polish United Workers' Party
- Spouse: Alicja Solska
- Profession: Teacher, Military

Military service
- Allegiance: Polish People's Republic
- Branch/service: Polish People's Army
- Years of service: 1943–1960
- Rank: Major general
- Battles/wars: World War II

Piotr Jaroszewicz (['pʲɔtr jarɔˈʂɛvit͡ʂ]; 8 October 1909 – 1 September 1992) was a Polish politician who served as Prime Minister of Poland between 1970 and 1980. After he was forced out of office, he lived quietly in a suburb of Warsaw until his assassination in 1992.

== Early life and education ==
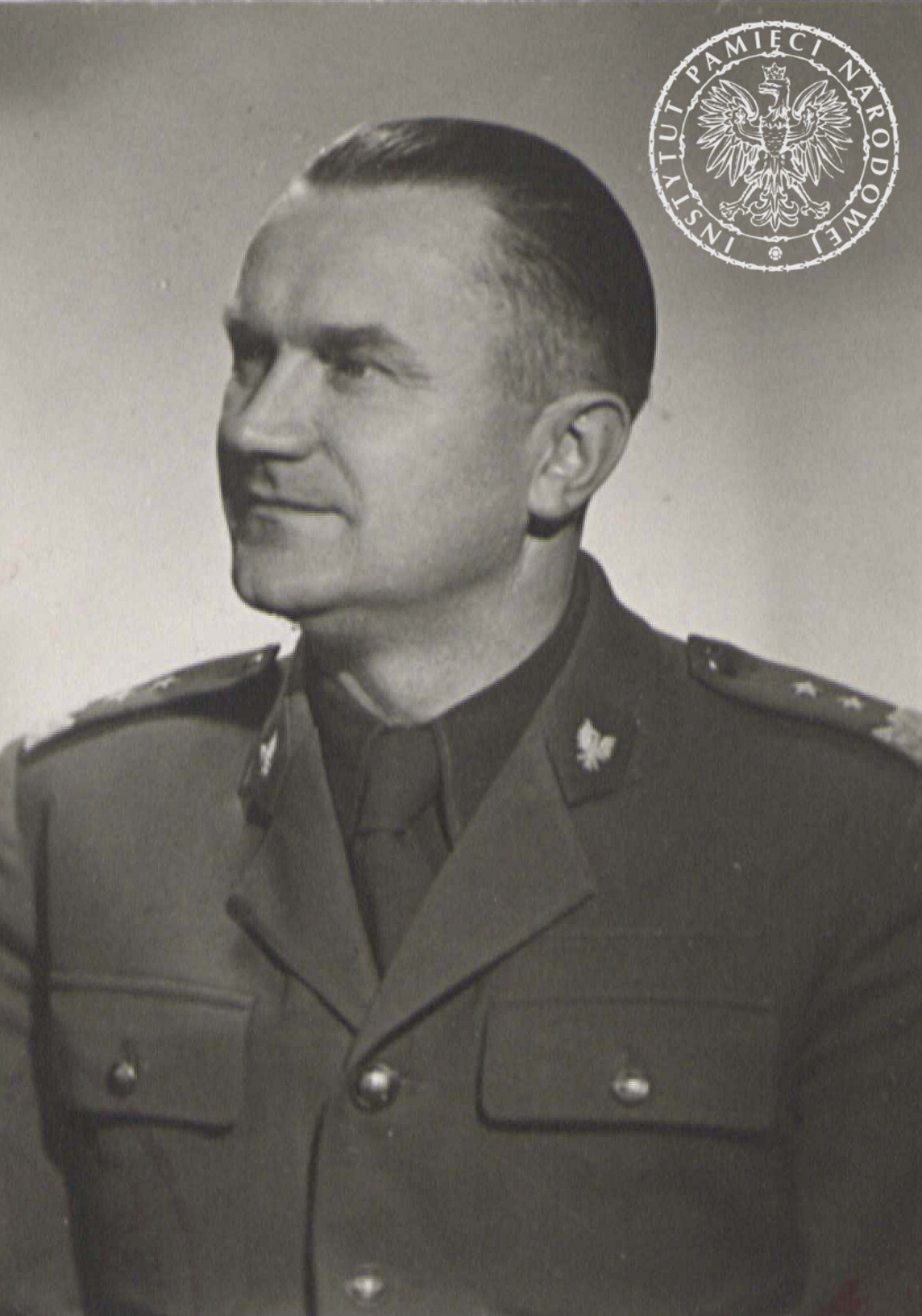
Piotr Jaroszewicz in the uniform of Major General of the Polish People's Army

Jaroszewicz was born on 8 October 1909 in Nieśwież, in the Minsk Governorate of the Russian Empire (present-day Belarus). After finishing secondary school in Jasło, he started working as a teacher and headmaster in Garwolin. After the outbreak of World War II and the Nazi-Soviet alliance established by the Molotov–Ribbentrop Pact, he moved to the Soviet-occupied zone of Poland. It has been claimed that he was a headmaster at Pinsk gymnasium. However, on 10 July 1940, he was deported to Slobodka, Krasnoborsky District, Arkhangelsk, from Stolin together with his first wife, Oksana Stefurak (born in Salov/Calow 1914) and daughter Alina (born 1940). In 1943 he joined the 1st Polish Army of General Zygmunt Berling. The following year, he joined the Polish Workers Party and was promoted to deputy political commander of the 1st Army.

== Political career ==
After the war, he became the deputy minister of defence (1945–1950). Since 1956, he was the Polish ambassador to COMECON. At the same time, between 1952 and 1970, he served as a deputy Prime Minister of Poland and briefly (1954–1956) as the minister of the mining industry. Jaroszewicz was a member of the Central Committee of the Polish United Workers' Party since its creation in 1948, and since 1964, he was also a member of the Political Bureau. From December 1970 until February 1980, he was the Prime Minister of Poland. The economic policies of Jaroszewicz and Edward Gierek led to a wave of protests in 1976 and 1980. In 1980, he gave up all his party posts and was expelled from the party the following year.

== Murder and aftermath ==
After his departure from office and the party, Jaroszewicz and his second wife, Alicja Solska, settled in the Warsaw suburb of Anin. The couple largely kept to themselves and did not socialise much. Jaroszewicz was obsessed with security; he had a 3.3-metre (11-foot) fence topped with barbed wire installed around their villa. When he walked their dog, neighbours said, he often carried a pistol with him.

Despite these measures, their son Jan Jaroszewicz found the couple murdered when he entered the house on 3 September 1992. Poison gas had been used to incapacitate the dog. Jaroszewicz's body, found in his upstairs study, had the belt that had been used to strangle him secured by an antique ice axe from his collection. The attackers had also beaten him, yet had bandaged the wounds.

Solska's body was next to her husband's. Her hands had been tied behind her back, and she had been shot in the head at close range with one of the couple's hunting rifles. Investigators believe that she had earlier managed to injure one of the killers during a struggle, since blood from her and an unknown individual was found in another room in the house.

The killers appeared to have searched every room. It was initially reported that they only took what were presumed to have been documents from one safe and left behind valuable old coins and art, suggesting the thieves were not motivated by financial gain. However, police records show the thieves actually stole two guns, 5,000 German marks, five gold coins and a lady's watch.

Friends and family said that Jaroszewicz had been even more paranoid than usual in the days before the murders, which were determined to have occurred on 1 September, two days before the bodies were discovered. The killings received significant media attention in Poland, due both to Jaroszewicz's past leadership and the brutality of the crime. While initial theories suspected that the murders were politically motivated, in 2017, Warsaw police alleged the burglary had been committed by the "Karate Gang" of Radom, a group of violent criminals active through the 1990s, who had broken into Jaroszewicz's home expecting to find significant sums of money and tortured him in an effort to find it. According to the police, when Jaroszewicz broke free, the gang murdered both him and his wife, then hurriedly left. Several Karate Gang members went on trial for this and other crimes in 2020, but were acquitted of the robbery and murder of Jaroszewicz and his wife in 2024. The prosecution announced plans to appeal.

== Promotions ==
- Chorąży (Standard-bearer) – 1 February 1944
- Porucznik (First lieutenant) – 1 May 1944
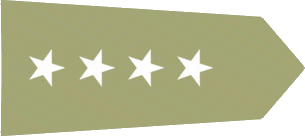
- Kapitan (Captain) – 27 July 1944
- Major (Major) – 1 October 1944
- Podpułkownik (Lieutenant colonel) – 3 November 1944
- Pułkownik (Colonel) – 18 April 1945
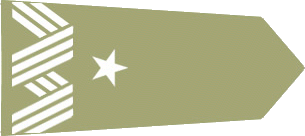
- Generał brygady (Brigadier general) – 15 December 1945
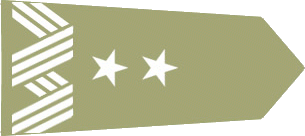
- Generał dywizji (Major general) – 11 November 1950

== Awards and decorations ==
- Polish:
  - Order of the Builders of People's Poland (18 July 1969)
  - Grand Cross of the Order of Polonia Restituta (1979, deprived of in July 1981)
  - Order of the Cross of Grunwald, 1st Class (8 October 1979)
  - Order of the Banner of Labour, 1st Class (1964)
  - Order of the Cross of Grunwald, 2nd Class (12 July 1945)
  - Commander's Cross of the Order of Polonia Restituta (19 July 1946)
  - Order of the Cross of Grunwald, 3rd Class (5 June 1945)
  - Silver Cross of Virtuti Militari (1945)
  - Medal of the 30th Anniversary of People's Poland (1974)
  - Medal for Warsaw 1939–1945 (17 January 1946)
  - Medal for Oder, Neisse and Baltic
  - Medal of Victory and Freedom 1945
  - Medal of the 10th Anniversary of People's Poland (30 December 1954)
  - Medal for Participation in the Battle of Berlin (1966)
  - Golden Medal of Merit for National Defence
  - Silver Medal of Merit for National Defence
  - Bronze Medal of Merit for National Defence
  - Badge of the 1000th Anniversary of the Polish State
  - Golden Badge of the Association of Volunteer Fire Departments (1966)
- Soviet:
  - Order of the October Revolution (1974)
  - Order of Friendship of Peoples (1979)
  - Medal "For the Victory over Germany in the Great Patriotic War 1941–1945"
  - Jubilee Medal "Twenty Years of Victory in the Great Patriotic War 1941–1945" (1972)
  - Jubilee Medal "Thirty Years of Victory in the Great Patriotic War 1941–1945" (1975)
  - Jubilee Medal "In Commemoration of the 100th Anniversary of the Birth of Vladimir Ilyich Lenin" (1969)
- From other countries:
  - Military Order of the White Lion, 1st Class (Czechoslovakia, 1949)
  - Grand Cross of the Order of the White Rose of Finland (Finland, 1974)
  - Grand Cross of the Legion of Honour (France, 1975)
  - Knight Grand Cordon of Order of the Crown (Iran, 1974)
  - Grand Collar of the Order of Prince Henry (Portugal, 1976)
  - Grand Cordon of the Order of Leopold (Belgium, 1977)
  - Grand Cross of the Order of May (Argentina, 1974)
  - Order of José Martí (Cuba, 1979)
  - Order of Georgi Dimitrov (Bulgaria)
  - Order of the Balkan Mountains, 1st Class (Bulgaria, 1979)
  - Medal of 90th Anniversary of the Birth of Georgi Dimitrov (Bulgaria, 1972)

== See also ==
- List of prime ministers of Poland
- List of unsolved murders (1980–1999)

Political offices
Preceded by Józef Cyrankiewicz	Prime Minister of Poland; 1970 – 1980	Succeeded by Edward Babiuch
