= Józef Pińkowski =

Polish Communist politician and economist

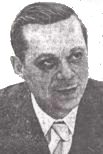

Prime Minister of Poland
- In office 24 August 1980 – 11 February 1981 Serving with Kazimierz Sabbat (in-exile)
- Preceded by: Edward Babiuch
- Succeeded by: Wojciech Jaruzelski

Personal details
- Born: 17 April 1929 Siedlce, Lublin Voivodeship, Poland
- Died: 8 November 2000 (aged 71) Warsaw, Poland
- Party: Polish United Workers' Party

Józef Pińkowski (pronounced [ˈjuzɛf pʲiɲˈkɔfskʲi]; 17 April 1929 – 8 November 2000) was a Polish Communist politician and economist who served as 35th Prime Minister of Poland from 1980 to 1981.

== Career ==
By profession, Pińkowski was an economist. In 1971 he became a member of the central committee of the PZPR. Between 1971 and 1974 he was First Deputy Chairman of the Planning Commission of the Ministerial Council. Between August 1980 and February 1981, during the early years of the Solidarity movement, he served with some success as Prime Minister of Poland under the party leadership of Stanisław Kania.

== Awards and decorations ==
- Order of the Builders of People's Poland (1970)
- Order of the Banner of Labour, 1st Class
- Order of the Banner of Labour, 2nd Class
- Knight's Cross of Order of Polonia Restituta

Political offices
Preceded by Edward Babiuch	Prime Minister of Poland; 1980 – 1981	Succeeded by Wojciech Jaruzelski
