= Aleksander Łuczak =

Polish historian and politician (1943–2023)

Minister of National Education
- In office 26 October 1993 – 6 March 1995
- Preceded by: Zdobysław Flisowski
- Succeeded by: Ryszard Czarny

Chairman of the State Committee for Scientific Research
- In office 7 March 1995 – 31 October 1997
- Preceded by: Witold Karczewski
- Succeeded by: Andrzej Wiszniewski

Personal details
- Born: Aleksander Piotr Łuczak; 10 September 1943 Legionowo, General Government (now Poland)
- Died: 15 March 2023 (aged 79)
- Party: PSL
- Education: University of Warsaw
- Occupation: Historian

Aleksander Piotr Łuczak (10 September 1943 – 15 March 2023) was a Polish historian and politician. A member of the Polish People's Party, he served as Minister of National Education from 1993 to 1995.

Łuczak died on 15 March 2023, at the age of 79.
