= Tadeusz Pyka =

Polish communist politician

Tadeusz Pyka (May 17, 1930 – May 23, 2009) was a former Polish communist politician, who served as a Deputy Prime Minister of Poland. In August 1980, he led a government commission which attempted to end a strike in the Polish city of Gdańsk, but he was replaced on August 21 without an explanation offered by state radio at the time for the change.

== Political career ==
Pyka was educated in the engineering of metallurgy. Pyka was a deputy to the Sejm, the Polish legislative body, for three consecutive terms from 1972 to 1980. In 1974, he became a deputy to the Chairman of the Planning Commission of the Central Committee of the Polish United Workers' Party. He was also a Deputy Prime Minister of Poland from October 23, 1975 to August 24, 1980, and a member of the Central Committee of the Polish United Workers' Party until 1980. In 1980, he was also briefly a deputy to a member of the Politburo of the Polish United Workers' Party. During the period of martial law in Poland in 1981 he was interned for a year and had charges pressed against him.

=== Gdańsk negotiations ===
In August 1980, due to economic difficulties, workers in the Polish city of Gdańsk went on strike. Around the middle of that month, the Polish government declared that it had created a commission that would converse with the strikers. The commission was led by Pyka, who was a relative newcomer to the inner circle of the communist Polish United Workers' Party, and a "junior man" when compared to Poland's other Deputy Prime Ministers. He was described as a "minor Party functionary" and a "close ally of Edward Gierek", the First Secretary of the Central Committee of the Polish United Workers' Party. Pyka stated that he would have "nothing to do" with the Inter-Enterprise Strike Committee, the main representative body of the Gdańsk strikers, especially with members Lech Wałęsa and Andrzej Gwiazda, as well as Anna Walentynowicz. Pyka argued that the Strike Committee was illegal, and that it did not represent the workers it claimed to. He was replaced as leader of the commission with Mieczysław Jagielski on August 21. State Polish Radio at the time gave no explanation as to why Pyka was replaced.

== Post-political career ==
He was a professor of economics at the Górnośląska Wyższa Szkoła Handlowa in Katowice. He died on May 23, 2009.

== See also ==
- Solidarity (Polish trade union)
