= Jerzy Ozdowski =

Polish economist

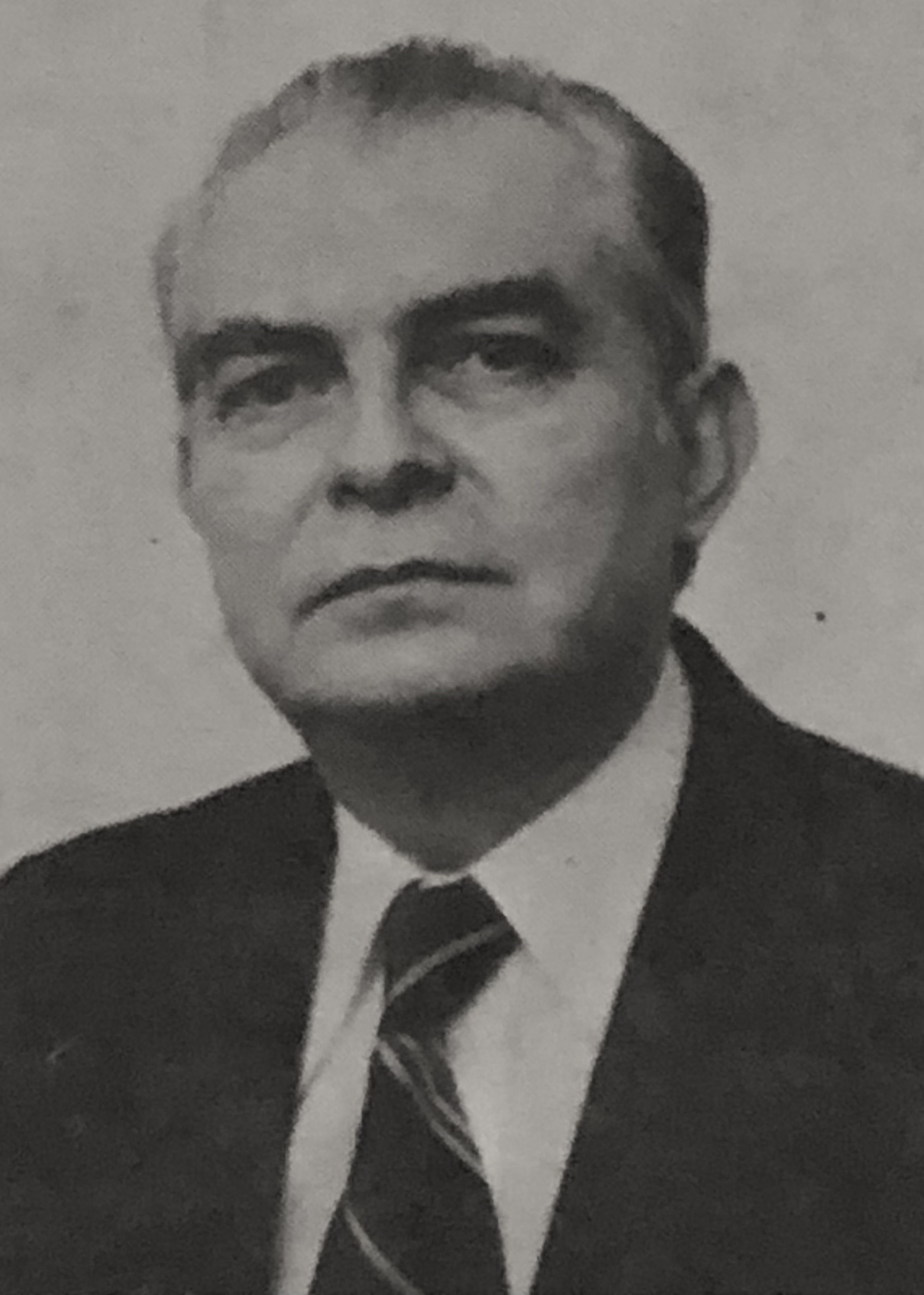
Jerzy Ozdowski

Jerzy Ozdowski (1925–1994) was a Polish economist and politician.
