= Józef Cyrankiewicz =

Polish politician (1911–1989)

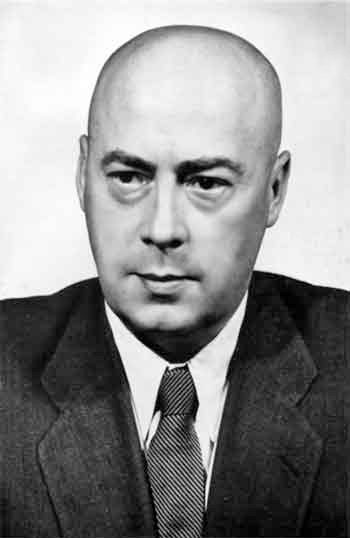

Prime Minister of Poland
- In office 18 March 1954 – 23 December 1970
- Deputy: See list: Jakub Berman Hilary Minc Zenon Nowak Tadeusz Gede Stefan Jędrychowski Konstanty Rokossowski Piotr Jaroszewicz Stanisław Łapot Franciszek Jóźwiak Eugeniusz Stawiński Zenon Nowak Stefan Ignar Eugeniusz Stawiński Zenon Nowak Stefan Ignar Piotr Jaroszewicz Eugeniusz Szyr Julian Tokarski Stefan Ignar Piotr Jaroszewicz Zenon Nowak Eugeniusz Szyr Julian Tokarski Franciszek Waniołka Julian Tokarski Zenon Nowak Eugeniusz Szyr Franciszek Waniołka Stefan Ignar Piotr Jaroszewicz Stanisław Kociołek Marian Olewiński Piotr Jaroszewicz Stanisław Majewski Eugeniusz Szyr Eugeniusz Szyr Zdzisław Tomal Józef Kulesza Mieczysław Jagielski
- Chairman: Aleksander Zawadzki; Edward Ochab; Marian Spychalski
- First Secretary: Bolesław Bierut; Edward Ochab; Władysław Gomułka; Edward Gierek
- Counterparts in-exile: Jerzy Hryniewski; Stanisław Mackiewicz; Hugon Hanke; Antoni Pająk; Aleksander Zawisza; Zygmunt Muchniewski
- Preceded by: Bolesław Bierut
- Succeeded by: Piotr Jaroszewicz
- In office 6 February 1947 – 20 November 1952
- President: Bolesław Bierut
- Deputy: Władysław Gomułka; Antoni Korzycki; Aleksander Zawadzki; Hilary Minc; Hilary Chełchowski; Stefan Jędrychowski; Tadeusz Gede
- First Secretary: Władysław Gomułka; Bolesław Bierut
- Counterparts in-exile: Tomasz Arciszewski; Tadeusz Bór-Komorowski; Tadeusz Tomaszewski; Roman Odzierzyński
- Preceded by: Edward Osóbka-Morawski
- Succeeded by: Bolesław Bierut

4th Chairman of the Council of State of the People's Republic of Poland
- In office 23 December 1970 – 28 March 1972
- Prime Minister: Piotr Jaroszewicz
- First Secretary: Edward Gierek
- President in-exile: August Zaleski; Council of Three
- Preceded by: Marian Spychalski
- Succeeded by: Henryk Jabłoński

Personal details
- Born: 23 April 1911 Tarnów, Austro-Hungary (now Poland)
- Died: 20 January 1989 (aged 77) Warsaw, Polish People's Republic
- Party: PPS (1930s–1948); PZPR (1948–1989)

Józef Adam Zygmunt Cyrankiewicz (Polish: [ˈjuzɛf t͡sɨranˈkʲɛvit͡ʂ]; 23 April 1911 – 20 January 1989) was a Polish Socialist (PPS) and after 1948 Communist politician. He served as premier of the Polish People's Republic between 1947 and 1952, and again for 16 years between 1954 and 1970. He also served as Chairman of the Polish Council of State from 1970 to 1972.

== Early life and education ==
Cyrankiewicz was born in Tarnów in what was then the Austro-Hungarian Empire, to Józef Cyrankiewicz (1881–1939) and Regina née Szlapak (1879–1967). His father was a local activist of the National Democracy as well as a lieutenant in the Polish Armed Forces while his mother owned several sawmills. Cyrankiewicz attended the Jagiellonian University. He became secretary of the Kraków branch of the Polish Socialist Party in 1935.

== World War II ==
Active in the Union of Armed Struggle (Związek Walki Zbrojnej, later renamed to Armia Krajowa), the Polish resistance organisation, from the beginning of Poland's 1939 defeat at the start of World War II, Cyrankiewicz was captured by the Gestapo in the spring of 1941 and, after imprisonment at Montelupich, was sent to the Auschwitz concentration camp. He arrived on 4 September 1942, and received registration number 62,933.

He, along with other Auschwitz prisoners, was eventually transferred to Mauthausen as the Soviet front line approached Auschwitz late in the war. He was eventually liberated by the United States Army.

=== The Auschwitz controversy ===
According to post-war communist era-propaganda, while in Auschwitz, Cyrankiewicz attempted to organize a resistance movement among the other imprisoned socialists and also worked on bringing the various international prisoners' groups together; those claims, used to build up his reputation in post-war Poland, are considered exaggerated by modern historians. Instead, modern historians note that Cyrankiewicz controversially not only refused an appeal of a death sentence by Witold Pilecki, a Home Army resistance fighter who infiltrated Auschwitz and is considered to be the main creator of the resistance there, but suggested that he be treated "harshly, as an enemy of the state".

== Rise to power ==
=== First period in office ===
Following the end of the war, he became secretary-general of the Polish Socialist Party's central executive committee in 1946. However, factional infighting split the Party into two camps: one led by Cyrankiewicz, the other by Edward Osóbka-Morawski, who was also prime minister.

Osóbka-Morawski thought the PPS should join with the other non-communist party in Poland, the Polish Peasant Party, to form a united front against communism. Cyrankiewicz argued that the PPS should support the communists (who held most of the posts in the government) in carrying through a socialist programme, while opposing the imposition of one party rule. The Communist Polish Workers' Party (PPR) played on this division within the PPS, dismissing Osóbka-Morawski and making Cyrankiewicz prime minister.

The PPS merged with the PPR in 1948 to form the Polish United Workers' Party (PZPR). Although the PZPR was the PPR under a new name, Cyrankiewicz remained as prime minister. He was also named a secretary of the PZPR Central Committee.

Cyrankiewicz gave up the prime minister's post in 1952 because party boss Bolesław Bierut wanted the post for himself. He did, however, become a deputy premier under Bierut.

=== Second period in office ===
However, in 1954, after Poland returned to "collective leadership", Cyrankiewicz returned to the premiership, a post he would hold until 1970. By this time, there was little left of Cyrankiewicz the socialist, as evidenced during the 1956 upheaval following Nikita Khrushchev's "secret speech". He tried to repress the rioting that erupted across the country at first, threatening that "any provocateur or lunatic who raises his hand against the people's government may be sure that this hand will be chopped off."

Cyrankiewicz was also responsible for the order to fire on the protesters during the 1970 demonstrations on the coast in which 42 people were killed and more than 1,000 wounded. A few months after these demonstrations, Cyrankiewicz turned over the premiership to his longtime deputy, Piotr Jaroszewicz, and was named chairman of the Council of State — a post equivalent to that of president. Although it was nominally the highest state post in Poland, Cyrankiewicz had gone into semi-retirement. He held this post until he formally retired in 1972.

Cyrankiewicz died in 1989, a few months before the collapse of the communist regime. However, Cyrankiewicz (with others involved in the 1948 show trial) was posthumously charged in 2003 with complicity in Witold Pilecki's judicial murder.

== Honours and awards ==
=== National honours ===
- Order of the Cross of Grunwald, 2nd Class (1946)
- Partisan Cross (1946)
- Grand Cross of the Order of Polonia Restituta (1949)
- Order of the Banner of Labour, 1st Class (1951)
- Order of the Builders of People's Poland (1954)
- Auschwitz Cross (1985)
- Medal of the 30th Anniversary of People's Poland
- Medal of the 40th Anniversary of People's Poland
- Medal of the 10th Anniversary of People's Poland
- Medal of Ludwik Waryński (1986)
- Golden Medal of Merit for National Defence
- Silver Medal of Merit for National Defence
- Bronze Medal of Merit for National Defence
- Badge of the 1000th Anniversary of the Polish State (1963)
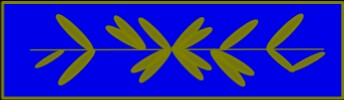
- Honorary Badge of the City of Poznań (1966)

=== Foreign honours ===
- (Czechoslovakia) Order of the White Lion, 1st Class (1947)
- (Socialist Federal Republic of Yugoslavia) Order of People's Liberation (1947)
- (Bulgaria) Order of 9 September 1944, 1st Class (1948)
- (Hungary) Grand Cross of the Hungarian Order of Merit (1948)
- (Romania) Order of the Star of the Romanian People's Republic, 1st Class (1948)
- (North Korea) Order of the National Flag, 1st Class (1957)
- (Mexico) Grand Cross of the Order of the Aztec Eagle (1963)
- Grand Cross of the Order of the White Rose of Finland with Collar (1964)
- (Socialist Federal Republic of Yugoslavia) Order of the Yugoslav Great Star (1964)
- (Italy) Knight Grand Cross of the Order of Merit of the Italian Republic (1965)
- (Iran) Grand Cordon of the Order of the Crown (1966)
- (Bulgaria) Order of Georgi Dimitrov (1967)
- (France) Grand Cross of the Légion d'honneur (1967)
- (Soviet Union) Jubilee Medal "In Commemoration of the 100th Anniversary of the Birth of Vladimir Ilyich Lenin" (1969)

== See also ==
- History of Poland (1945-1989)
- List of honorary citizens of Skopje

Political offices
Preceded by Edward Osóbka-Morawski	Prime Minister of Poland; 1947 – 1952	Succeeded by Bolesław Bierut
Preceded by Bolesław Bierut	Prime Minister of Poland; 1954 – 1970	Succeeded by Piotr Jaroszewicz
Preceded by Marian Spychalski	Chairman of the Polish Council of State; 1970 – 1972	Succeeded by Henryk Jabłoński
