= Order of the Banner of Labour =

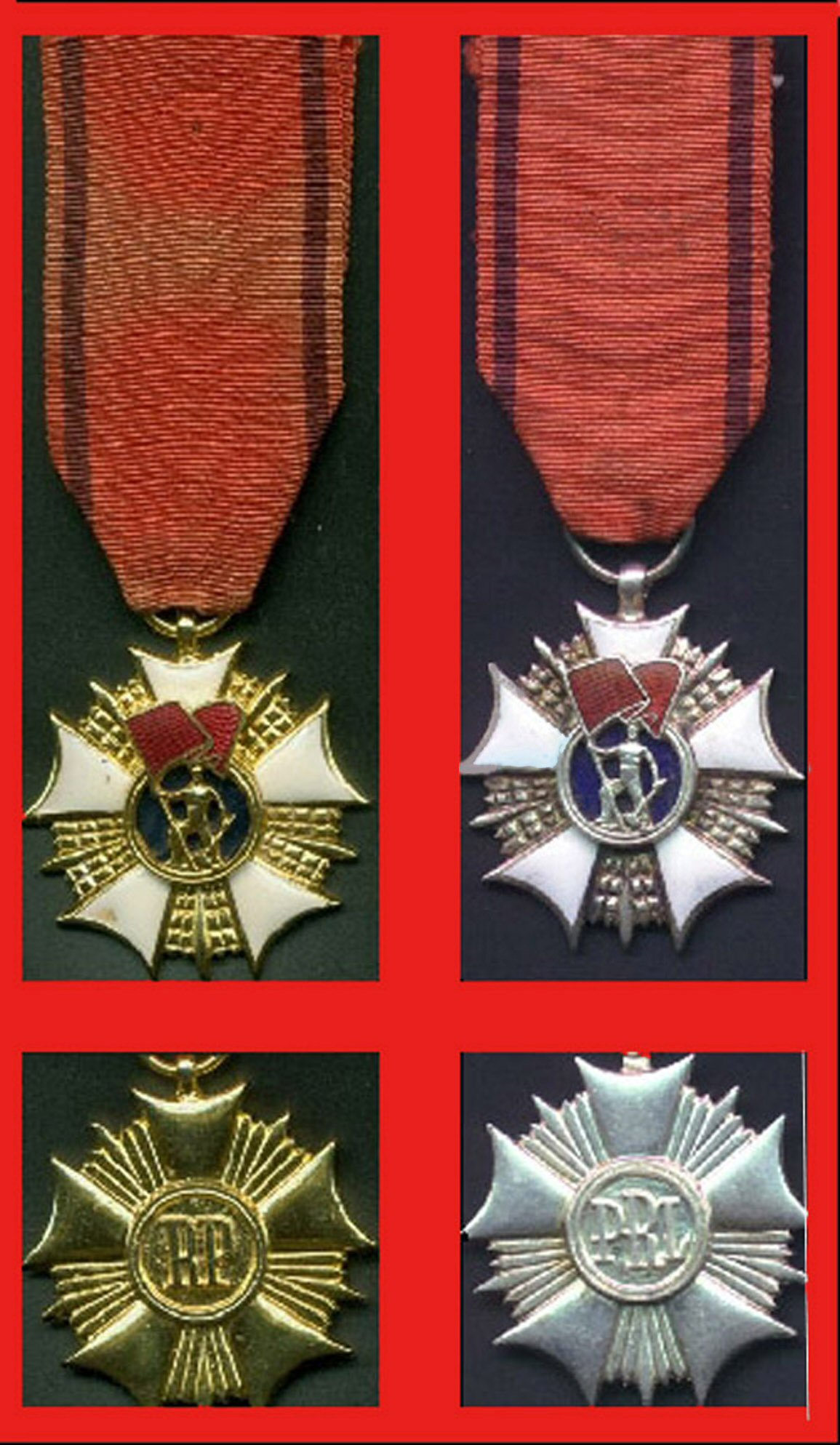
- Type: Medal
- Description: Ø 43 mm
- Country: Poland
- Presented by: President of Poland, later by Polish Council of State
- Eligibility: Civilian award
- Status: No longer awarded
- Established: 2 July 1949
- ribbon bar

The Order of the Banner of Labour (Polish: Order Sztandaru Pracy) was a governmental award in Poland during the 20th-century era of the Polish People's Republic, a former Marxist-Leninist state.

The order was established by the Sejm (a chamber of the Polish parliament) on 2 July 1949. It was given in recognition of "unique achievements for the Nation and the Country". In 1960 the criteria for receiving this award were changed to "special achievements for building socialism in the Polish People's Republic".

The Order was also awarded to institutions and was automatically awarded to miners after 20 years of dedicated labor.

== See also ==
- Order of the Builders of People's Poland
- Order of the Red Banner
