= Members of the 1st Sejm of the Polish People's Republic =

Deputies of the 1st term of the Sejm of the Polish People's Republic were elected during the parliamentary elections, which took place on October 26, 1952.

The first session was held on November 20, 1952, and the last one, the 39th - on November 20, 1956. The term of office of the Sejm lasted from November 20, 1952 to November 20, 1956.

Party composition at the first session of the Sejm of the first term. The regulations of the Sejm did not provide for the functioning of deputies' clubs, but in their place Provincial Deputies' Groups were established.

Political grouping	XI 1952
Polish United Workers' Party	273
United People's Party	90
Alliance of Democrats	25
Unaffiliated	37
Together	425

== Presidium of the Sejm of the 1st term ==
Envoy	Function	Party	Time in office	
Envoy	Function	Party	From	Do
Lucjan Rudnicki	Senior Marshal	Polish United Workers' Party	November 20, 1952	
The Senior Marshal presides over the sessions of the Sejm before the election of the Presidium
Jan Dembowski	Marshal of the Sejm	Nonpartisan	November 20, 1952	November 20, 1956
Franciszek Mazur	Deputy Speaker of the Sejm	Polish United Workers' Party	November 20, 1952	November 20, 1956
Józef Ozga-Michalski	Deputy Speaker of the Sejm	United People's Party	November 20, 1952	November 20, 1956
Stanisław Kulczyński	Deputy Speaker of the Sejm	Democratic Party	November 20, 1952	November 20, 1956

=== As at the end of the term ===
The Deputies of the 1st term were associated in the following Provincial Deputies' Groups:

Parliamentary Group of the Capital City of Warsaw
Leon Adamowski; Jerzy Albrecht; Jakub Berman; Jan Dembowski (biologist)	Franciszek Fiedler; Eugeniusz Kujawski (Member of the Sejm of the Polish People's Republic) (Note: Married on April 23, 1956.); Oskar Lange; Józef Markow	Konstanty Rokossowski; Stanisława Rutkowska; Zygmunt Skibniewski; Zdzisław Skórzyński	Roman Szymański (MP); Antoni Tracikiewicz; Władysław Wicha
Parliamentary Group of the City of Łódź
Władysław Dworakowski; Wanda Gościmińska; Henryk Jabłoński	Jerzy Jodłowski; Kazimierz Mijal; Kornelia Plewińska	Jan Ptasiński; Michalina Tatarkówna-Majkowska; Józefa Ulkowska	Stanisław Urbańczyk (politician)
Provincial Parliamentary Team of the Białystok Voivodeship
Mieczysław Bodalski; Tadeusz Czystohorski; Nikolai Ivanov (worker); Eugenia Krassowska-Jodłowska	Eugeniusz Makowski; Edwarda Orłowska; Paweł Ostasiewicz; Bolesław Podedworny	Stanisław Sadowski (doctor); Włodzimierz Sokorski (Note: Married on April 25, 1953.); Sergius Soroko; Tadeusz Strzałkowski	Jerzy Sztachelski; Grzegorz Wojciechowski (communist activist); Jadwiga Zubrycka; Józef Zychowicz
Provincial Parliamentary Team of the Bydgoszcz Voivodeship
Antoni Alster; Feliks Baranowski; Franciszek Blinowski; Anna Cichańska; Stefan Czarnecki (MP); Eugenia Furmaniak; Tadeusz Gede	Stanisław Jaroszowa; Antoni Korzycki; Władysław Krzyżański; Władysław Kuźniar; Paweł Nahajowski; Franciszek Ochmański; Bronisław Półturzycki	Adam Rapacki (politician); Bronisława Rzytelewska; Franciszek Sawczyk; Wacław Schayer; Jan Skruszewicz; Stanisław Stachacz; Zofia Staros	Ludomir Stasiak; Stanisław Tołwiński; Zofia Wasilkowska; Witold Zacharewicz (chemist)
Provincial Parliamentary Team of the Gdańsk Voivodeship
Antoni Bigus; Romuald Adam Cebertowicz; Leon Chajn; Stanisław Gabryl	Stefan Jędrychowski; Franciszek Królikiewicz; Julianna Leśniak; Franciszek Murawski	Mieczysław Popiel; Stanisław Radkiewicz; Stanisław Sołdek; Zdzisław Studziński (Note: Married on December 18, 1953.)	Stanisław Teisseyre; Jan Trusz; Mieczysław Wągrowski; Czesław Wycech
Provincial Parliamentary Team of the Kielce Voivodeship
Kazimierz Banach; Hilary Chełchowski; Henryk Czajka; Szymon Dulny; Jan Frankowski; Karolina Grzegorczyk; Julian Hochfeld	Mieczysław Hoffmann; Piotr Jaroszewicz; Stanisław Kozubski (Member of the Sejm of the Polish People's Republic); Stanisław Łapot; Antoni Maciejewski; Stanisław Małolepszy; Antoni Matla	Zygmunt Moskwa; Wanda Nawrot; Józef Noga; Józef Ozga-Michalski; Henryk Papiński; Stanisław Pawlak (1907–2001); Jerzy Putrament	Józef Siemieniec; Jan Stelmach; Józef Szydło (Note: March 17, 1955.); Piotr Tomasik (MP); Andrzej Werblan; Augustyn Wiatr; Władysław Wilczyński (Member of the Sejm of the Polish People's Republic)
Provincial Parliamentary Team of the Koszalin Voivodeship
Maciej Elczewski; Tadeusz Janczyk; Helena Jaworska	Zofia Kulińska; Wacław Lewikowski	Zofia Łaszkowska; Stanisław Pingielski	Kazimierz Rynkiewicz; Krystyna Trepa
Provincial Parliamentary Team of the Krakow Voivodeship
Witold Biernawski; Władysław Brzegowy; Tadeusz Bulwan; Jakub Poverty; Stanisław Cieślak (politician); Józef Cyrankiewicz; Bolesław Drobner; Władysława Gut; Maria Iskra	Józef Karweta; Bolesław Kieniewicz; Roman Kosiorowski; Jadwiga Kozłowska (Note: She was married on April 26, 1953.); Anna Krzyżak; Jadwiga Lekczyńska; Stanisław Malik (politician); Teodor Marchlewski; Lucjan Motyka	Tadeusz Mrugacz; Alicja Musiałowa-Afanasjew; Małgorzata Nowicka; Jerzy Pryma; Jan Pypeć; Włodzimierz Reczek; Bolesław Rumiński; Stanisław Skrzeszewski; Jan Szkop	Aniela Tomiak; Jan Wiktor (writer); Stanisław Wojciechowski (MP); Wiktor Woźniak; Zenon Wróblewski; Kazimierz Wyka; Zofia Zemanek; Olga Zwierzyna-Hora
Provincial Parliamentary Team of the Lublin Voivodeship
Stanisław Bieniek; Józef Bień; Józef Czapski (1907–1987); Józef Dechnik; Kazimierz Głębski; Franciszek Jóźwiak; Józef Kalinowski (politician)	Romuald Kisielewski; Jan Klecha; Janina Mazur (politician); Stanisław Mazur; Antoni Mitura; Stefan Mrowicki; Helena Pasierb	Jerzy Popko; Maria Puchacz; Paweł Rybka; Stanisław Sitek (Member of the Sejm of the Polish People's Republic); Franciszek Stopa; Bolesław Strużek; Henryk Świątkowski	Jan Karol Wende; Andrzej Wojtkowski (historian); Władysław Wołczko; Alfred Trawiński; Jan Zamecki; Olga Żebruń
Provincial Parliamentary Team of the Łódź Voivodeship
Wincenty Baranowski; Karol Bąkowski; Celina Budzyńska; Klementyna Chrzanowska; Adam Doliński; Maria Domagalska; Czesław Domagała	Julian Horodecki; Stefan Ignar; Wiktoria Kipigroch; Władysław Kowalski (Marshal of the Sejm); Zygmunt Krzywański; Eugeniusz Kwiatek; Marian Minor	Marian Mrówczyński; Maria Olejniczak (MP); Jadwiga Prawdzicowa; Władysław Rogut; Lucjan Rudnicki; Eugeniusz Stawiński; Tomasz Suszczyński	Anna Szadkowska; Władysław Wałęski; Henryk Wiączek; Józef Zbudniewek
Provincial Parliamentary Team of the Olsztyn Voivodeship
Kazimierz Dubowski; Wacław Gumiński; Jan Aleksander Król	Stanisław Krupa; Juliusz Malewski; Józef Piskorski	Jan Rabanowski; August Rogala; Jan Rotkiewicz	Gerard Shock; Edward Turowski; Paweł Wojas
Provincial Parliamentary Team of the Opole Voivodeship
Józef Baron (politician); Stanisław Chlebda; Tadeusz Dietrich; Ostap Dłuski	Władysław Grabowski (Member of the Sejm of the Polish People's Republic); Jan Kornek; Antoni Maławski; Jan Mrocheń	Roman Nowak; Karol Pordzik; Teofil Socha; Tadeusz Wieczorek (politician)	Paweł Woszek; Zofia Tomczyk
Provincial Parliamentary Team of the Poznań Voivodeship
Wacław Barcikowski; Jan Dąb-Kocioł; Zofia Dembińska; Jan Dobraczyński; Maria Dota; Władysław Hałaburda; Wiktoria Hetmańska; Jarosław Iwaszkiewicz; Jan Izydorczyk	Edward Januchowski; Leon Janczak; Jan Kaj; Our Adolf; Józef Kościelak; Jan Królski; Jan Kulski; Stanisław Lipiński (MP); Stanisław Mazur (1897–1964)	Jerzy Morawski (politician); Władysław Najdek; Marian Nowacki; Józef Pieprzyk; Józef Popielas; Edmund Pszczółkowski; Stefan Ratajczak; Aleksander Rozmiarek; Ignacy Skowroński	Leon Stasiak; Vsevolod Strazewski; Michał Szaroch; Szczepan Szczeniowski; Irena Sztachelska; Józef Tazbir; Helena Wieczorek; Józef Wysocki (Member of the Sejm of the Polish People's Republic); Stefan Żółkiewski
Provincial Parliamentary Team of the Rzeszów Voivodeship
Konstanty Dąbrowski; Irena Domańska; Jan Dumanowski; Paweł Hoffman; Władysław Jagusztyn; Maria Jarochowska	Wojciech Kosiba; Leon Kruczkowski; Arkadiusz Łaszewicz; Helena Michalewicz; Antoni Niemiec; Stanisław Opałka	Marian Ozga; Piotr Pacosz; Helena Pasternak; Wacław Rózga; Włodzimierz Szczepanik; Peter Firefly	Stanisław Tkachev; Julian Tokarski (1903–1977); Walenty Tomaka; Stanisław Wais; Roman Zambrowski; Stanisław Zgórski
Provincial Parliamentary Team of the Stalinogrod Voivodeship
Franciszek Apryas; Stefan Batorski; Alojzy Biłko; Szczepan Błaut; Jerzy Bordziowski; Władysław Bożek; Piotr Brzózka (politician); Bernard Bugdoł; Barbara Bulska; Alicja Chmura; Edward Chromy; Maria Cykman	Marian Czerwiński (PPR politician); Janina Dziadek; Edward Gierek; Dominik Horodyński; Maria Jaszczukowa; Stefan Kalinowski; Marian Karasiński; Józef Kieszczyński; Wiktor Kłosiewicz; Paweł Kocot; Józef Koszutski (1906–1979); Henryk Kowol	Józef Krzysztofik; Jerzy Lamuzga; Jadwiga Lewecka; Stanisław Maciński; Wiktor Markiefka; Władysław Matwin; Hilary Minc; Andrzej Misiaszek; Gustaw Morcinek; Karol Moskwa; Ryszard Nieszporek; Zenon Nowak	Edward Ochab; Władysław Oleś (Note: Married on September 24, 1954.); Józef Olszewski; Eugenia Pragierowa; Stanisław Szerszeń; Eugeniusz Szyr; Karol Wadula; Józef Waliczek; Franciszek Waniołka; Aleksander Zawadzki; Kiejstut Żemaitis
Provincial Parliamentary Team of the Szczecin Voivodeship
Jerzy Andrzejewski; Mikołaj Dachów; Olga Dubik	Jan Jabłoński (politician); Władysław Korczyc	Pelagia Lewińska; Edmund the Ottoman	Władysław Witold Spychalski; Wojciech Wolkiewicz (Note: Married on September 5, 1956.)
Provincial Parliamentary Team of the Warsaw Voivodeship
Janina Balcerzak; Wojciech Brydziński; Helena Boczek; Janina Cabaj; Wincenty Chabura; Janina Chmielewska; Jan Domański (1898–1978); Igor Dziaczkowski; Franciszek Dzięcioł	Michał Gwiazdowicz; Wacław Janikowski; Wanda Jarmułowicz-Podniesińska; Marian Jaworski (politician); Stanisława Jodłowska; Jurek's Honor; Leon Kasman; Władysław Katuszewski; Henryk Korotyński	Eustachy Kuroczko; Władysław Łączyński; Konstanty Łubieński; Leonard Małecki; Stefan Matuszewski; Władysław Nawaduński; Adolf Owczarczyk; Szymon Pietrzak; Maria Stelmach	Ryszard Strzelecki (minister); Mieczysław Różański (politician); Marian Rybicki; Wacław Śliwiński; Jerzy Teliga; Walenty Titkow; Edmund Tomaszewski (MP); Apolinary Wojciechowski; Mieczysław Wysocki
Provincial Parliamentary Team of the Wrocław Voivodeship
Józef Chaba; Bolesław Fietko; Jan Gawełko; Witold Jarosiński; Aleksander Juszkiewicz; Adam Kiewicz; Jan Kijewski; Józef Kiliś	Stanisław Kowalczyk (1910–1992); Stanisław Kulczyński; Antoni Kuligowski; Franciszek Mazur; Edward Miskurka; Zenon Młotkiewicz; Stanisław Nowocień; Roman Piotrowski	Irena Piwowarska; Stanisław Popławski; Janina Pyłka; Jan Rustecki; Michał Rysiński; Tadeusz Rek; Jean Sendek; Bolesław Sinicki	Amelia Szczerba; Anna Tarniewicz; Tadeusz Toczek; Kazimierz Witaszewski; Władysław Wodziński; Tadeusz Zastawnik
Provincial Parliamentary Team of the Zielona Góra Voivodeship
Franciszek Banasik; Franciszek Dębowski; Jerzy Feliksiak	Stanisław Janusz; Stanisław Kaliszewski; Zofia Kręciwilk	Feliks Lorek; Stanisław Mozol; Marian Naszkowski	Andrzej Toczek

=== Members of Parliament whose mandate expired during the first term (12 Members of Parliament) ===
Sejm deputy	Expiration date of the mandate	Cause	Successor
Dorota Kłuszyńska (Note: The mandate expired before taking the oath.)	November 22, 1952	Died in office	Maria Stelmach
Henryk Kołodziejski	April 18, 1953	Died in office	Jadwiga Kozłowska
Marian Stawecki	September 9, 1953	resignation of mandate	Władysław Wilczyński (Member of the Sejm of the Polish People's Republic)
Józef Niećko	November 20, 1953	Died in office	Józef Czapski (1907–1987)
Zygmunt Modzelewski	June 18, 1954	Died in office	Władysław Oleś
Zofia Nałkowska	December 17, 1954	Died in office	Jan Kornek
Grzegorz Bil	March 17, 1955	Died in office	Józef Szydło
Bronisław Marks	September 24, 1955	Died in office	Eugeniusz Kujawski (Member of the Parliament of the Polish People's Republic)
Stanisław Kowalczyk (Member of the Sejm of the Polish People's Republic, 1st term)	October 5, 1955	resignation of mandate	Henryk Wiączek
Bolesław Bierut	March 12, 1956	Died in office	Roman Szymański (MP)
Jan Stachura (politician)	June 18, 1956	Died in office	Wojciech Wolkiewicz
Adam Polewka	October 2, 1956	Died in office	seat left vacant

== See also ==
- 1952 Polish parliamentary election

== Bibliography ==
- "Archive of Data about MPs".
