= Jerzy Albrecht =

Polish economist and communist politician (1914-1992)

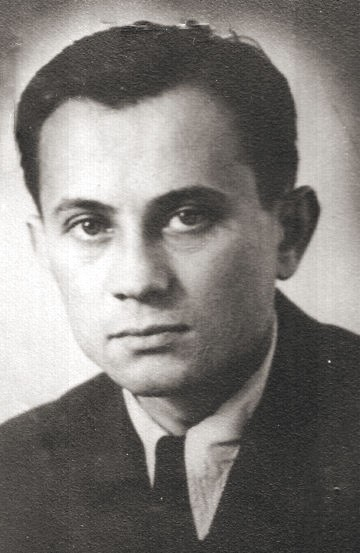

Minister of Finance of Poland
- In office 16 November 1960 – 15 July 1968
- Prime Minister: Józef Cyrankiewicz
- Preceded by: Tadeusz Dietrich
- Succeeded by: Stanisław Majewski

Mayor of Warsaw
- In office 23 May 1950 – 14 May 1956
- Preceded by: Stanisław Tołwiński
- Succeeded by: Janusz Zarzycki

Personal details
- Born: 7 October 1914 Wrzeszczewice, Congress Poland
- Died: 8 September 1992 (aged 77) Warsaw, Poland
- Party: Polish United Workers' Party
- Other political affiliations: Polish Workers' Party
- Education: Academy of Political Sciences

Jerzy Albrecht (born October 7, 1914 in Wrzeszczewice, died September 8, 1992 in Warsaw) was a Polish economist and communist politician, he held the rank of Lieutenant Colonel of the Polish People's Army. Minister of Finance from 1960–1968, member of the Council of State (1955–1960, including deputy chairman from 1957). He served as member of the State National Council, the Legislative Sejm, and the Sejm of the Polish People's Republic of the 1st, 2nd, 3rd, and 4th terms.

== Biography ==
Son of Jan and Natalia, in 1933, he passed his secondary school leaving examination at the Copernicus State Gymnasium in Łódź. From 1933 to 1936, he studied at the Academy of Political Sciences in Warsaw. In 1934, he became a member of the Communist Union of Polish Youth, and in 1938, he joined its Warsaw committee. From 1938 to 1939, he was active in the Democratic Club.

After the September Campaign, he found himself in the Soviet-occupied territory of Lviv. From 1941, he was a member of the Union of Liberation Struggle. In 1942, he joined the Polish Workers' Party (PPR), and from May to August 1942, he served as First Secretary of the PPR Warsaw Committee. He was then arrested by the Gestapo. From 1942 to 1945, he was imprisoned in the German concentration camps at Majdanek, Flossenbürg, and Gross-Rosen.

From June 1945 to November 1948, he again served as First Secretary of the Polish Workers' Party Warsaw Committee. From 1945 to 1948, he was also a member of the Polish Workers' Party Central Committee, and from 1947 to 1948, a member of the PPR Secretariat. From 1948, he was a member of the Organizational Bureau of the Central Committee of the Polish Workers' Party and subsequently headed the Propaganda and Press Department and the Propaganda, Culture, and Education Department of the Central Committee of the PPR. From 1948, he joined the Polish United Workers' Party, remaining head of the Propaganda, Culture, and Education Department, this time of the Central Committee of the PZPR, and also a member of the Organizational Bureau of the Central Committee (until 1954). From 1948 to 1968, he was a member of the Central Committee of the PZPR, and from 1956 to 1961, secretary of the Central Committee. In the 1950s, he was associated with the so-called Puławy faction, and (along with Władysław Matwin) was included in the group of so-called young secretaries. He was a delegate to the 1st, 2nd, 3rd, and 4th Congresses of the PZPR.

From 1945 to 1969, he served as a member of the State National Council, the Legislative Sejm, and the Sejm of the Polish People's Republic (PRL) of the 1st, 2nd, 3rd, and 4th terms. From 1952 to 1956, he chaired the Sejm Committee on Municipal Economy and Housing, and also served as a member of the presidium of the National Front National Committee. From March to August 1956, he served as secretary of the Central Committee of the Polish United Workers' Party, responsible for education. From 1950 to 1956, he served as chairman of the presidium of the Municipal National Council of the Capital City of Warsaw, de-facto of Mayor of Warsaw. From 1955 to 1957, he was a member, and from 1957 to 1961, deputy chairman, of the State Council. From 1960 to 1968, he served as Minister of Finance, after which he retired from political activity.

He was a long-time member of the Supreme Council of the Society of Fighters for Freedom and Democracy. During the 1969–1974 term, he served as vice-president of the Supreme Council. In the 1980s, he served on numerous committees and advisory boards, including: a member of the Commission for Economic Reform, a member of the Citizens' Consultative Convention at the chairman of the National Council of the Capital City of Warsaw (1987), as well as of the Social Council of the Election Fund at the Warsaw Committee of the Polish United Workers' Party before the parliamentary elections in June 1989. From June 1985, he was also a member of the Editorial Committee for the preparation of Władysław Gomułka's Collected Writings. On November 28, 1988, he joined the Honorary Committee for the Celebration of the 40th Anniversary of the PPR-PPS Unification Congress – the establishment of the Polish United Workers' Party.

== Awards ==
- Order of the Banner of Labour, 1st Class (twice, e.g. in 1964)
- Order of the Cross of Grunwald, 2nd Class (15 July 1945)
- Commander's Cross with Star of the Order of Polonia Restituta (8 October 1984)
- Commander's Cross of the Order of Polonia Restituta (19 August 1946)
- Gold Cross of Merit (11 May 1946)
- Medal for Warsaw 1939–1945 (17 January 1946)
- Auschwitz Cross (1985)
- Bronze Medal of Merit for National Defence (1967)
- Ludwik Waryński Medal (1986)
- Badge of the 1000th Anniversary of the Polish State (1966)
- Badge "For Merit to the Union of Fighters for Freedom and Democracy"
- Golden Badge of Honour "For Merit to Warsaw" (1960)
- Honorary Badge of the Pomeranian Griffin (1961)
- Badge of Honor "For Merit to the Development of the Koszalin Voivodeship" (1966)
- Golden Badge "For Merit to the Development of the Katowice Voivodeship" (1964)
- Commemorative Medal on the Occasion of the 40th Anniversary of the State National Council (1983)
- Commemorative Medal "40th Anniversary of the Polish United Workers' Party" (1988)
