= Polish Women's League =

- Liga Kobiet Polskich
- Formation: 1918
- Legal status: Active
- Purpose: Support women's rights
- Official language: Polish

Polish Women's League (Polish: Liga Kobiet Polskich) is a Polish women's organisation. Two organizations with the name Women's League were founded in 1913 and 1915 respectively, which united to become a single national Women's League, active from 1918–1939. The Women's League was re-founded in 2001.

== First Polish Women's League ==
Polish Women's League originated in two separate women's organisations, with similar names: the League of Polish Women of the War Ambulance (Polish: Liga Kobiet Polskich Pogotowia Wojennego), founded in 1913, and the League of Women in Galicia and Silesia (Polish: Liga Kobiet Galicji i Śląska), founded in 1915, both commonly called "Liga Kobiet" or Women's League.

The Women's League of 1913 was founded by Izabela Moszczeńska, Jadwigi Marcinowskiej, Teresy Ciszkiewiczowej and Heleny Ceysingerówny in Warsaw, which was then the Russian part of Poland. It worked to unite Polish women for the nation's independence. In 1914–1916, it created branches all over Poland, with the ambition to function as a national umbrella organisation for women's organisations in a future united Poland. In 1916, it presented a petition to the Polish authorities (Regency Council (Poland)), requesting women's suffrage.

The Women's League of 1915 was founded by a number of small women's groups in Krakow in then Austrian Poland, with the Women's League of 1913 in Russian Poland as its role model, also working for the independence of Poland and supporting the Polish government during the war.

Women's suffrage was introduced when Poland became an independent nation in November 1918, and women were granted equal political rights with men in the new by the Provisional People's Government of the Republic of Poland on 11 November 1918, a reform which was confirmed and implemented by Józef Piłsudski on 28 November.

On 29-31 December 1918, when Austrian Poland and Russian Poland had been united to an independent nation, the two Women's Leagues were merged in to a united national Women's League on a conference in the new capital of Warsaw.

During the Interwar period, notable members of the organisation included Zofia Moraczewska, Dorota Kłuszyńska and Zofia Daszyńska-Golińska. However, the success during the 1920s and 1930s was limited because of the resistance from the Catholic church.

After the foundation of the Polish People's Republic in 1945, it was dissolved and replaced by a state women's organisation with a similar name: the League of Polish Women, also called Liga Kobiet Polskich.

== Second Polish Women's League ==
In 2001, the Polish Women's League was refounded. The present Polish Women's League reference the original Pre-War Polish Women's League as its predecessor.
