= Witold Jedlicki =

Polish journalist

- Born: February 9, 1929; Warsaw, Poland
- Died: September 8, 1995 (aged 66); Jerusalem, Israel
- Education: University of Warsaw
- Occupation: Journalist
- Employers: Polish Scientific Publishers PWN; Institute of Philosophy and Sociology of the Polish Academy of Sciences; University of California
- Organization: Crooked Circle Club
- Notable work: Chamy i Żydy

Witold Jedlicki (born 9 February 1929 in Warsaw; died 8 September 1995 in Jerusalem) was a Polish sociologist and journalist of Jewish descent, activist of the Crooked Circle Club, and author of Chamy i Żydy (Oafs and Jews), in which he described the divisions in the communist Polish United Workers' Party (Polish: PZPR), including between the so-called groups of Natolinians and Puławians.

== See also ==
- 1968 Polish political crisis
- Roman Zambrowski
- Władysław Gomułka
