= Members of the 3rd Sejm of the Polish People's Republic =

Polish parliament members

Deputies to the 3rd Sejm of the Polish People's Republic were elected during the 1961 Polish parliamentary election, which took place on April 16, 1961. The first session was held on May 15, 1961, and the last, the thirty-second, on March 29, 30 and 31, 1965. The term of office of the Sejm lasted from April 16, 1961 to April 16, 1965.

Political party affiliations at the first session of the Sejm of the second term and the status at the end of the term.

Political grouping	3rd Sejm in April 1961	3rd Sejm in April 1965	+/−
Polish United Workers' Party	256 (Note: Including Zbigniew Gertych (PZPR), re-elected on March 17, 1957.)	244	12
United People's Party	117 (Note: Including Wincenty Baranowski (ZSL), elected in the 1957 elections. He died before the beginning of the term.)	115	2
Democratic Party	39	38	1
Znak	5	5	0
Christian Social Association	5	5	0
PAX Association	5	5	0
Unaffiliated (Note: Non-party MPs who did not represent any association.)	37	36	1
Total	460	444	

== Presidium of the Sejm of the 3rd term ==
Member	Title	Party	Time in office	
Member	Title	Party	Took office	Left office
Bolesław Drobner	Senior Marshal	Polish United Workers' Party	May 15, 1961	
The Senior Marshal presides over the sessions of the Sejm before the election of the Presidium
Czesław Wycech	Marshal of the Sejm	United People's Party	May 15, 1961	April 16, 1965
Jerzy Jodłowski	Deputy Speaker of the Sejm	Democratic Party	May 15, 1961	April 16, 1965
Zenon Kliszko	Deputy Speaker of the Sejm	Polish United Workers' Party	May 15, 1961	April 16, 1965

== Party affiliation ==
=== At the end of the second term ===
Deputies of the second term were associated in the following parliamentary parties:

- Polish United Workers' Party - 244 deputies, the party chairman was Zenon Kliszko
- United People's Party - 115 deputies, the party chairman was Bolesław Podedworny
- Democratic Party - 38 MPs, the party chairman was Jerzy Jodłowski
- Znak - 5 MPs, the party chairman was Stanisław Stomma
- Christian Social Association - 3 MPs, the party chairman was Jan Frankowski
- PAX - 3 MPs, the party chairman was Jerzy Hagmajer
- Non-partisan MPs – 36 MPs.

Members of the Polish United Workers' Party
Władysław Adamczyk; Zenon Adamczyk; Władysław Adamiec; Eugeniusz Ajnenkiel; Jerzy Albrecht; Zofia Als-Iwańska; Marian Antczak; Maria Augustyn; Paweł Badura; Metodiusz Bartnik; Władysław Bieńkowski; Franciszek Blinowski; Mieczysław Bodalski; Józefa Boehm; Jan Borowczyk; Leon Brudziński; Piotr Brzóska; Władysław Budzik; Andrzej Burda; Aleksander Burski; Michał Chwiej; Stefan Cichosz; Józef Ciupek; Bronisława Cychańska; Józef Cyrankiewicz; Paweł Dąbek; Konstanty Dąbrowski; Witold Dąbrowski; Janina Doliwa-Taborska; Jerzy Domiński; Wit Drapich; Bolesław Drobner; Teofil Fleischer; Marianna Fornalczyk; Jan Frey-Bielecki; Zdzisław Furmanek; Jan Furmaniak; Piotr Gajewski; Jan Gałązka; Teresa Gąsiorkiewicz; Tadeusz Gede; Janina Geller; Zbigniew Gertych; Edward Gierek; Teofil Głowacki; Władysław Gomułka; Kazimierz Graczyk; Edward Graliński; Zofia Grzebisz; Józef Grzecznarowski; Tadeusz Gutowski; Ryszard Hajduk; Wincenty Hajduk; Henryk Hałas; Wit Hanke; Stanisław Hasiak; Jan Hebda; Mieczysław Hebda; Stanisław Heidner; Ryszard Hill; Maria Hulajew	Bolesław Iwaszkiewicz; Jan Izydorczyk; Henryk Jabłoński; Mieczysław Jagielski; Jan Jagodziński; Zbigniew Jakus; Tadeusz Janczyk; Włodzimierz Janiurek; Witold Jarosiński; Piotr Jaroszewicz; Wojciech Jaruzelski; Helena Jaworska; Marian Jaworski; Stanisław Jędras; Stefan Jędrychowski; Stefan Jędryszczak; Stanisław Juchnicki; Jadwiga Juszczyńska; Zdzisław Kaczmarczyk; Stefan Kamiński; Ludwik Karolczak; Jan Kasiak; Leon Kasman; Józef Kieszczyński; Jan Klecha; Zenon Kliszko; Stanisław Klusek; Stanisław Kołodziński; Zdzisława Konieczna; Grzegorz Korczyński; Henryk Korotyński; Jan Kościelniak; Kazimierz Kotwica; Edmund Kowalski; Władysław Kozdra; Wincenty Kraśko; Stanisław Krauss; Władysław Kruczek; Ryszard Kubalewski; Walenty Kubica; Jan Kulas; Józef Kulesza; Antoni Kuligowski; Józef Kuropieska; Stanisław Kurowski; Alfred Kusiak; Stanisław Kuziński; Kazimierz Kwiatkowski; Józef Kwietniewski; Oskar Lange; Ignacy Loga-Sowiński; Arkadiusz Łaszewicz; Teresa Łukaszczyk; Władysław Machejek; Józef Macichowski; Zbigniew Macura; Juliusz Malewski; Mieczysław Marzec; Władysław Matwin; Władysław Matys; Oskar Mędrzak	Eugenia Mikłaszewicz; Jan Mirek; Marian Miśkiewicz; Jan Mitręga; Mieczysław Moczar; Jerzy Morawski; Lucjan Motyka; Kazimierz Mroczkowski; Alicja Musiałowa; Józef Nagórzański; Ryszard Nieszporek; Tadeusz Nocuń; Roman Nowak; Zenon Nowak; Tadeusz Nowakowski; Kazimierz Nowicki; Edward Ochab; Jan Olszewski; Jerzy Olszewski; Józef Olszewski; Stanisław Opałko; Władysław Orlewski; Stanisław Osiński; Bronisław Ostapczuk; Jan Ozga; Adam Palczak; Władysław Pawlak; Zdzisław Piętka; Anna Piotrowska; Ernest Pischinger; Marian Pluta; Jan Polski; Ryszard Pospieszyński; Stanisław Prüfer; Bogusław Przeczek; Edmund Pszczółkowski; Jan Ptasiński; Adam Rapacki; Marian Renke; Wacław Rózga; Maksym Rudczyk; Bolesław Rumiński; Edward Ruszkowski; Marian Rybicki; Jan Sabik; Ludwik Sanetra; Balbina Semczuk; Maria Serafiniuk; Stefan Siekierski; Aleksy Sieradzki; Henryk Skowron; Jan Słabiak; Marianna Sołtyszewska; Michał Specjał; Józef Spychalski; Marian Spychalski; Roman Stachoń; Artur Starewicz; Eugeniusz Stawiński; Ryszard Strzelecki; Edmund Stuczyński	Zdzisław Studziński; Henryk Szafrański; Franciszek Szałach; Franciszek Szczerbal; Wilhelm Szewczyk; Jan Szostak; Jerzy Sztachelski; Edmund Szumigała; Anna Szumiłowska; Jan Szydlak; Józef Szymański; Władysław Szymczak; Eugeniusz Szyr; Kazimierz Śliwa; Jan Śmigiel; Michalina Tatarkówna-Majkowska; Józef Tejchma; Walenty Titkow; Julian Tokarski; Stanisław Tomaszewski; Józef Trojok; Ryszard Trzcionka; Mieczysław Trześniak; Wacław Tułodziecki; Tadeusz Uchwat; Stanisław Ulicki; Tadeusz Urban; Jerzy Urbański; Zbigniew Uzar; Franciszek Wachowicz; Karol Waduła; Stanisław Wais; Antoni Walaszek; Stanisław Walendowski; Franciszek Waniołka; Paweł Warchoł; Jan Warzecha; Julianna Wasilewska; Jan Wasilkowski; Andrzej Werblan; Bolesław Wicenty; Florian Wichłacz; Feliks Widy-Wirski; Tadeusz Wieczorek; Lucjan Wiśniewski; Szczepan Włodarczak; Jan Wojak; Paweł Wojas; Józef Wołek; Michał Woźniak; Edward Zachajkiewicz; Celina Zadurska; Zofia Zakrzewska; Roman Zambrowski; Janusz Zarzycki; Stanisława Zawadecka; Stanisław Ziarkiewicz; Stanisław Zieliński; Jerzy Ziętek; Edward Żebrowski; Stefan Żółkiewski
Members of the United People's Party
Wincenty Aleksiejczuk; Antoni Andreasik; Kazimierz Banach; Józef Baron; Roman Bartkiewicz; Leon Biliński; Alojzy Biłko; Gertruda Brawańska; Czesław Burski; Władysław Cabaj; Halina Ciesielska; Stanisław Cieślak; Józef Ciuba; Jan Dąb-Kocioł; Maria Dąbrowska; Helena Dąbska; Franciszek Depa; Adam Dominikowski; Bronisław Drzewiecki; Edward Duda; Szymon Dziedzic; Władysław Fołta; Marcin Galek; Władysław Gawlik; Franciszek Gesing; Mieczysław Grad; Franciszek Grochalski; Stanisław Gucwa; Julia Hołdakowska	Julian Horodecki; Czesław Hudowicz; Stefan Ignar; Tadeusz Ilczuk; Władysław Jagusztyn; Ludwika Jakubowska; Leon Janczak; Mieczysław Janisławski; Tadeusz Jędruch; Edwarda Kaczor; Julian Kadlof; Jan Kaj; Bogusław Kajdas; Kazimierz Kaniuga; Wawrzyniec Karaś; Stanisław Karpiński; Ignacy Konkolewski; Andrzej Korczak; Antoni Korzycki; Władysław Kosmowski; Roch Kostrzewa; Teresa Król; Janina Kubani; Aleksander Kubicki; Łukasz Kumor; Sylwester Leczykiewicz; Józef Lempkowski; Maria Lipka; Bolesław Łęczycki	Ferdynand Łukaszek; Franciszek Maj; Kazimierz Maj; Tadeusz Makowski; Tomasz Malinowski; Helena Martyka; Wojciech Mazurek; Franciszek Mleczko; Franciszek Morański; Franciszek Murawski; Konstanty Nadratowski; Władysław Najdek; Józef Noga; Leon Olszewski; Józef Olszyński; Bronisław Owsianik; Józef Ozga-Michalski; Władysław Ozga; Mieczysław Paczkowski; Władysław Piątkowski; Helena Piereśko; Bolesław Podedworny; Leon Poniedziałek; Mieczysław Porzuczek; Walter Późny; Stanisław Romanowski; Antoni Rybak; Jan Ryznar; Tadeusz Rześniowiecki	Czesław Sadowski; Aleksander Schmidt; Jan Schneider; Hieronima Sikorska (Note: She took her vows on May 18, 1961.); Tadeusz Sitek; Feliks Starzec; Ludomir Stasiak; Tadeusz Stefaniak; Zbigniew Strzemiecki; Wanda Sułek; Piotr Szymanek; Franciszek Śliwa; Jan Śliwa; Władysław Tarabasz; Tadeusz Toczek; Zdzisław Tomal; Władysław Tomala; Łucja Tomaszewska; Józef Trzaska; Bronisław Warowny; Jan Wiensek; Tadeusz Wilk; Waldemar Winkiel; Józef Wroniak; Czesław Wycech; Marian Wyka; Marian Wysokiński; Zygmunt Załęski
Members of the Democratic Party
Andrzej Benesz; Stanisława Biskupska; Adam Bugajski; Ryszard Burchacki; Leon Chajn; Stanisław Chlebda; Józef Czapski; Paweł Dubiel; Waleria Fegler; Tadeusz Gierzyński	Michał Grendys; Leonard Hohensee; Stanisław Janeczek; Julian Jaworski; Leon Jezierski; Jerzy Jodłowski; Stanisław Kaliszewski; Maria Kamińska; Józef Kaszewski; Jan Kowal	Eugenia Krassowska-Jodłowska; Stanisław Kulczyński; Witold Lassota; Włodzimierz Lechowicz; Zygmunt Olczak; Józef Piskorski; Jan Pohorski; Józef Raźny; Aleksander Rozmiarek; Jan Serafin	Zdzisław Siedlewski; Zofia Stypułkowska; Czesław Szczepaniak; Edmund Ujma; Jan Wende; Zygmunt Wierzyński; Aleksander Wyrobek; Stanisław Zajączek
Members of Znak
Stefan Kisielewski; Konstanty Łubieński	Tadeusz Mazowiecki	Stanisław Stomma	Jerzy Zawieyski
Circle of Deputies of the Christian Social Association
Zygmunt Filipowicz	Jan Frankowski	Janusz Makowski	
PAX Deputies' Circle
Andrzej Grabski	Jerzy Hagmajer	Józef Knapik	
Non-partisan MPs
Jan Augustyn; Remigiusz Bierzanek; Jerzy Bukowski; Edmund Domerecki; Magdalena Dubiel; Marian Dudek; Stefan Gołębiowski; Józef Górczyński; Maria Honkowicz	Jerzy Hryniewiecki; Jarosław Iwaszkiewicz; Jerzy Jabłkiewicz; Franciszek Jakszewicz; Bronisław Juźków; Wacław Kiełczewski; Kazimierz Kopecki; Jacek Koraszewski; Kazimierz Król	Eleonora Kunik; Wiesława Lenartowicz; Leon Lendzion; Rufina Ludwiczak; Bolesława Maciejewska; Lucyna Malczewska; Łucja Matuszewska; Konstanty Morawski; Zygmunt Piątkowski	Maria Piechotka; Paweł Pytel; Klemens Schroeder; Wiktoria Sienkiewicz; Olga Szwałkiewicz; Maria Świątkowska; Janina Tyrna; Franciszek Wasążnik; Emanuel Wysocki

=== Deputies Whose Terms Ended During the 3rd Term of the Sejm of the Polish People's Republic (16 Deputies) ===
Deputy	Expiry Date of Mandate	Reason for Termination	Successor
Jan Napora	4 August 1961	Deceased	Mandate remained vacant
Władysław Gniewkowski	16 June 1962	Deceased	Mandate remained vacant
Leon Kruczkowski	1 August 1962	Deceased	Mandate remained vacant
Marek Kwiek	19 December 1962	Deceased	Mandate remained vacant
Piotr Pacosz	28 January 1963	Deceased	Mandate remained vacant
Stanisław Miłostan	1 July 1963	Deceased	Mandate remained vacant
Władysław Wilk	15 October 1963	Deceased	Mandate remained vacant
Józef Kwiatek	9 February 1964	Deceased	Mandate remained vacant
Władysław Bartkiewicz	12 February 1964	Deceased	Mandate remained vacant
Ostap Dłuski	12 February 1964	Deceased	Mandate remained vacant
Stanisław Żarek	10 March 1964	Deceased	Mandate remained vacant
Czesław Wójtowicz	22 April 1964	Deceased	Mandate remained vacant
Kazimierz Lepszy	30 May 1964	Deceased	Mandate remained vacant
Franciszek Bartoszek	2 May 1964	Deceased	Mandate remained vacant
Maria Rodak	10 July 1964	Deceased	Mandate remained vacant
Aleksander Zawadzki	7 August 1964	Deceased	Mandate remained vacant

== See also ==
- Sejm of the Polish People's Republic
- Polish United Workers' Party
- United People's Party (Poland)
- Alliance of Democrats (Poland)
- History of Poland (1945–1989)
- People's Republic of Poland
- 1961 Polish parliamentary election

== Bibliography ==
- "Archive of Data about MPs". sejm.gov.pl.
