= Heart of Frédéric Chopin =

Coordinates: 52°14′19.3″N 21°1′01.1″E

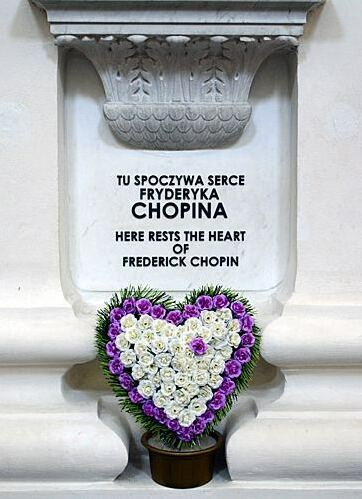
Inscription on the pillar containing Frédéric Chopin's heart in Warsaw's Holy Cross Church

The heart of Frédéric Chopin is preserved in a pillar of Holy Cross Church in Warsaw. After Chopin died in Paris on 17 October 1849 at the age of 39, his heart was removed during an autopsy performed by the physician Jean Cruveilhier. While his body was buried at Père Lachaise Cemetery, the heart was preserved in alcohol (probably cognac) and later taken to Poland by his sister Ludwika Jędrzejewicz in accordance with his wishes.

The heart was placed in the Holy Cross Church and immured in a pillar in 1879. During the Warsaw Uprising it was removed by German authorities but returned after the war. It has been the subject of scientific interest concerning Chopin’s cause of death, traditionally attributed to tuberculosis; a visual inspection in 2014 supported this diagnosis.

== Death and removal of heart ==
Composer Frédéric Chopin suffered from poor health throughout his life, including respiratory problems, chronic diarrhea, and significant weight loss. As an adult, he weighed less than 45 kilograms (99 lb). In 1849, anticipating his death, Chopin made arrangements for his funeral. He had a fear of being buried alive (taphophobia) and asked his sister, Ludwika Jędrzejewicz, to remove his heart and transport it to Warsaw for burial at a local church.

Chopin died in Paris on 17 October 1849. The day before his death, Chopin requested that his physician, Jean Cruveilhier, perform an autopsy. During the procedure, Cruveilhier removed Chopin's heart and submerged it in alcohol, probably cognac. His body was at Père Lachaise Cemetery in Paris, while his heart was placed in a hermetically sealed crystal jar. In early 1850, his sister transported the heart to Poland, where it would eventually be treated as an exceptional artefact within the culture of Poland, afforded the respect usually reserved for saintly relics.

== Smuggling the heart into Poland ==
In early January 1850, Chopin's eldest sister, Ludwika Jędrzejewicz, returned from France by rail to Poland with her daughter and her brother's heart. She carried the heart with her, concealing its container underneath her cloak or skirt as she smuggled it through a customs inspection at the Austrian border and past Russian border agents into Poland. Soviet music historian Igor Boelza wrote about her journey, explaining that Jędrzejewicz had hidden "a small oak trunk under her dress. In it was a casket made of ebony wood, containing a precious vessel holding Chopin's heart".

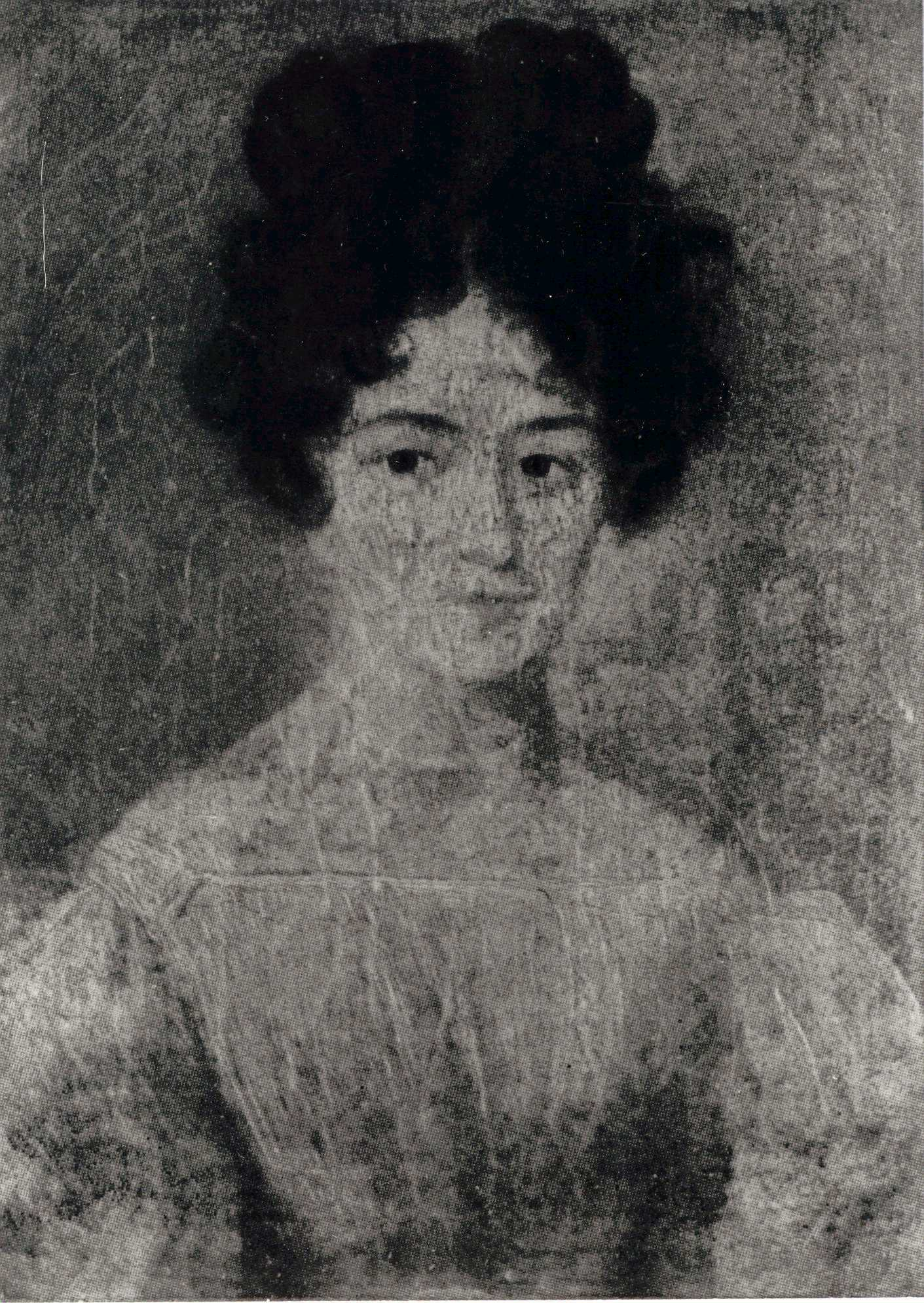
Ludwika Jędrzejewicz smuggled her brother's heart into Poland in 1850.

Chopin's heart arrived in Warsaw and was kept by his sister and mother, resting on top of a dresser at the home of Jędrzejewicz and the Kalasanty family. Prior to Jędrzejewicz's death in 1855, she may have arranged for the transfer of the heart to Warsaw's Holy Cross Church. There was opposition within the church's clergy to having the heart in the upper part of the church, as Chopin was not a saint. Instead, the heart was tucked away in the church's catacombs and lay there undisturbed and unlabeled for over two decades. In 1878, journalist Adam Pług found the heart in a box and wrote about his discovery in a Warsaw journal.

The clergy of the church were persuaded to move the heart in part due to the fact that the heart of novelist Klementyna Hoffmanowa was being kept in the Wawel Cathedral. With the support of apostolic administrator Antoni Ksawery Sotkiewicz, the heart was moved to the upper part of the church on 1 March 1879 and immured in the first pillar on the left, facing towards the church's great nave. The transfer of the heart took place in secret due to fears that Tsarist authorities would seize it. Composer Władysław Żeleński was one of the organizers of the transfer ceremony, which was attended by around a dozen people.

On 29 February 1880, Chopin's heart was consecrated. A tablet carved from Carrara marble by sculptor Leonard Marconi and dedicated to the memory of Chopin was installed on the pillar a week later. A biblical verse from Matthew 6:21 was inscribed onto one of the plaques: "For where your treasure is, there your heart will be also."

For decades, the heart was the sole public monument in Warsaw honoring Chopin that the Tsarist authorities allowed. It drew "covert displays of nationalist fervor". Once Poland achieved independence in 1918, it became an open shrine. In 1926, Archbishop Antoni Szlagowski said of Chopin: "All our past sings in him, all our slavery cries in him, the beating heart of the nation, the great king of sorrows."

== Nazi possession and return ==
After the German Army captured Warsaw in 1939, performances of Chopin's music were banned, the Fryderyk Chopin Institute was shuttered, and the Frédéric Chopin Monument in Łazienki Park was destroyed. During the 1944 Warsaw Uprising, the Holy Cross Church was damaged and captured by the Nazis. A German priest by the name of Schulze requested that the occupying forces be allowed to take possession of Chopin's heart for safekeeping. It was taken by SS officer Heinz Reinefarth and then given to SS commander Erich von dem Bach-Zelewski, who kept it at his headquarters as part of his collection of curios.

As the occupation was drawing to a close, Bach-Zelewski, known for his brutal suppression of the uprising, returned the heart. Polish journalist Andrzej Pettyn, who wrote a definitive account of Chopin's heart, wrote that Bach-Zelewski's gesture "aimed at reducing his own fault and presenting himself to the world in a more favorable light." Bach-Zelewski ordered that Chopin's heart be transferred to the auxiliary bishop of Warsaw Antoni Szlagowski. German officials arranged for a film crew to document the transfer of the heart to Szlagowski as a part of Nazi propaganda. At the moment the urn containing the heart was to be handed over, the spotlights they were using malfunctioned, an event for which Szlagowski said to his colleagues: "Thank the Lord. This time these barbarians will not succeed in their propaganda ploy." Szlagowski had the heart transferred to St. Hedwig Church in Milanówek, escorted by a contingent of German soldiers.

== Milanówek and return to Warsaw ==
Upon the arrival of Chopin's heart in Milanówek, it was hidden out of fear that the Germans would try to repossess it. The heart was briefly kept at the house of a professor named Antoniewicz and the apartment of the pianist Maria Findeisen. Thereafter, the heart was kept by Archbishop Szlagowski, atop a piano, in his private chapel until October 1945. A small wooden casket was created to hold the urn. Bronisław Edward Sydow, a member of the board of the Fryderyk Chopin Institute, approached officials from the Provisional Government of National Unity to arrange a ceremonial return of the heart to the Holy Cross Church, which by that time had been mostly restored. The Executive Committee of the National Celebration of the Return of Chopin's Heart to Warsaw was established on 18 September 1945. Sydow asked to check the condition of the relic and examined the heart in Milanówek. The container was opened and Sydow observed:

The urn consisted of an outer box made of oak, smooth, on a dark bylaid, in which there is a second mahogany box polished with marquetry (porte lines) embellished. Recessed in the lid is a silver plate in the form of a heart, with an engraved inscription containing Frederic Chopin's birth and death dates. This box is surrounded by lead plates for protection from moisture. Inside this box is a large crystal jar hermetically sealed, in which, in transparent alcohol, is Chopin's perfectly preserved heart. What is striking is the size of the heart, for a figure of average height it is immeasurably large. Presumably under the influence of heart disease, which primarily contributed to Chopin's early death, in addition to tuberculosis.

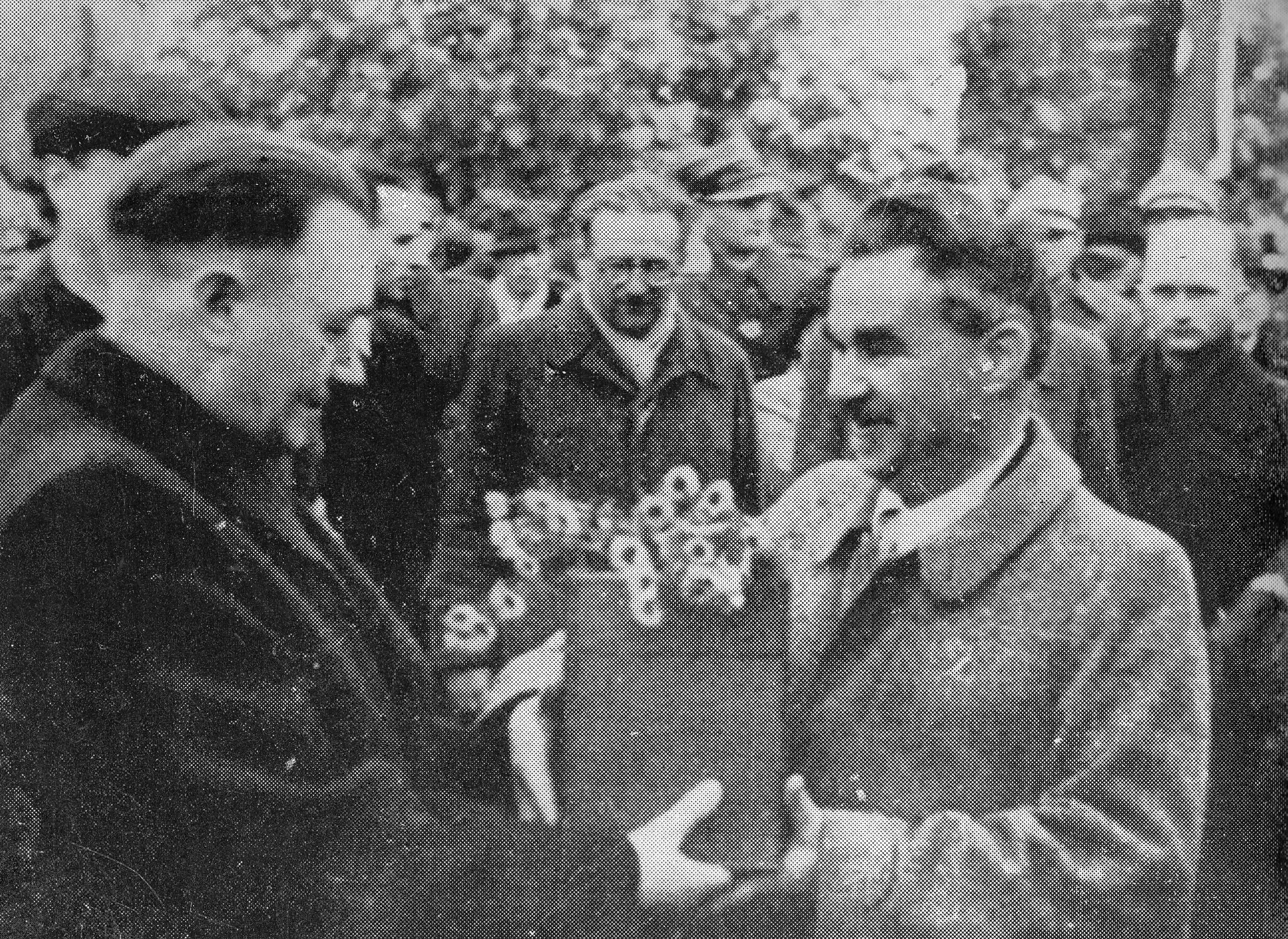
President Bolesław Bierut hands the urn containing Chopin's heart to Warsaw mayor Stanisław Tołwiński in 1945.

On 17 October 1945, the 96th anniversary of Chopin's death, the urn containing his heart was handed over to Leopold Petrzyk in Milanówek in St. Hedwig Church's courtyard. A delegation including pianist Bolesław Woytowicz then transported it by car to Żelazowa Wola, the village where Chopin was born, via a meandering 90-kilometre (56 mi) route taking it through Grodzisk Mazowiecki and Błonie. Crowds lined up along the route, which was adorned with white and red Polish flags. Petrzyk passed the urn along to then-President Bolesław Bierut, who handed it over to Warsaw mayor Stanisław Tołwiński. Following a short concert by pianist Henryk Sztompka, the delegation proceeded to Warsaw. There, Wiktor Grodzicki gave a welcoming speech, saying in part:

This heart first beat 135 years ago, in nearby Żelazowa Wola, and soon began to beat more vividly to the sound of a folk song resounding from peasant huts, and when not many years had passed, the same peasant, Masurian song, amplified a thousandfold by Chopin's heart and genius, was already resounding throughout Europe, and today, 96 years after that heart stopped beating – it resounds throughout the world, bearing witness to the immortal values of our song, our culture and our nation.

After the heart arrived in Warsaw, an afternoon commemorative service at Holy Cross Church was broadcast to the nation, with both the president and the prime minister of Poland in attendance. A eulogy given by musicology professor Hieronim Feicht was described by the newspaper Życie Warszawy as "a profound analysis of the artistic values of Chopin's music". The heart was then returned to the pillar beneath a bust of Chopin created by sculptor Andrzej Pruszyński.

== Secret exhumation and examination ==
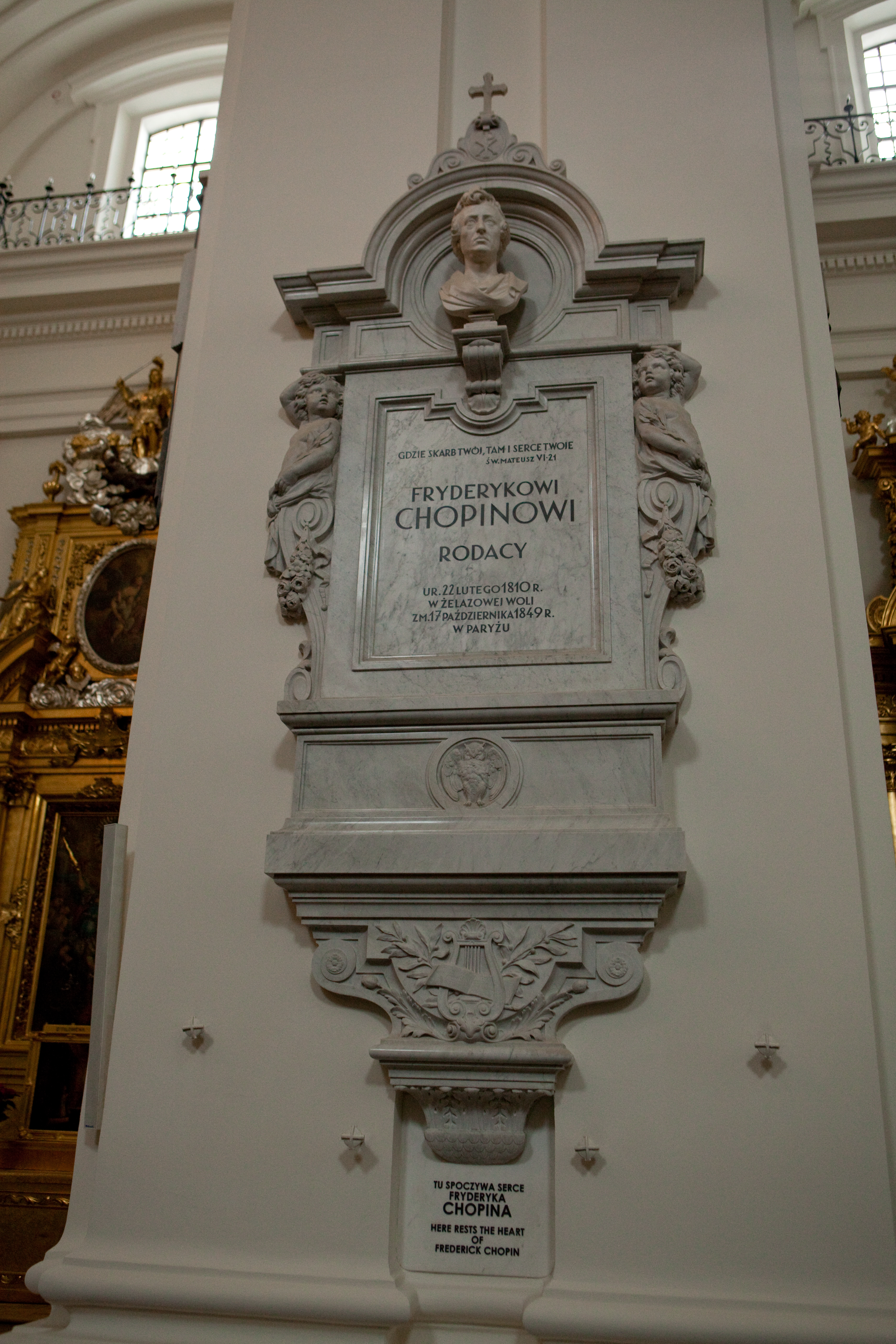
The pillar in Holy Cross Church containing Chopin's heart

Over the years, speculation about the cause of Chopin's death led to calls to examine the heart. In 2008, scholars requested that a DNA analysis of the heart's tissue be conducted to determine if Chopin had died from cystic fibrosis rather than tuberculosis. Cystic fibrosis was unknown during his lifetime and was thought to be a better explanation for his symptoms. The request was refused by the Polish government.

On 14 April 2014, a group of church officials, scientists and representatives from the Fryderyk Chopin Institute disinterred the jar containing Chopin's heart. Researchers examined the heart in secret, though they limited themselves to a visual inspection and did not open the jar. They took photographs, applied sealing wax to the jar, and only revealed that they had made an inspection five months later.

The scientists published their findings in a 2017 article in The American Journal of Medicine. They wrote that the floppy and massively engorged heart appeared to have been removed using the "French method"—pulling it out and severing the aorta and pulmonary artery. The surface of the heart had a frosted appearance, being covered with a "fine, whitish, massive fibrillary coating". Hemorrhagic effusions were observed, as were three small white-glass nodules. The authors of the article concluded that Chopin had pericarditis which was brought on by tuberculosis. A letter to the editor published in the American Journal of Medicine called the diagnosis of tuberculosis into question.

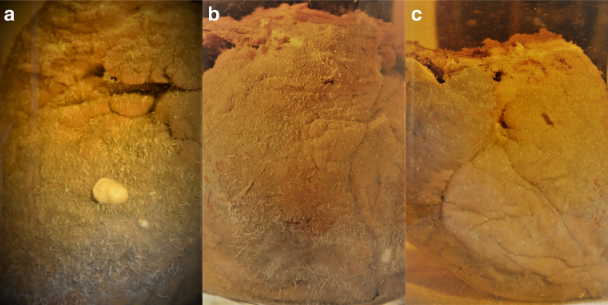
Frédéric Chopin's heart

Another inspection of the heart is not expected to take place until 2064.

== See also ==
- Heart-burial
