= Trybuna =

- Type: Daily newspaper
- Format: Berliner
- Publisher: Ad Novum
- Founded: 12 February 1990
- Ceased publication: 4 December 2009
- Political alignment: Social democracy
- Language: Polish
- Headquarters: Warsaw, Poland
- Circulation: 50,000 (2009)
- ISSN: 0867-0536
- OCLC number: 73601540
- Website: www.trybuna.com.pl

Trybuna (Polish pronunciation: [trɨˈbuna]) was a Polish left-wing newspaper, often seen as the outlet of the post-communist factions (Social Democracy of the Republic of Poland, Democratic Left Alliance).

== Overview ==
Trybuna inherited many traditions, including its name, from Trybuna Ludu, the official newspaper of the Polish United Workers' Party. The publisher of the paper was Ad Novum.

The paper ceased to exist on 7 December 2009 (last issue published on 4 December). The official reason: outstanding liabilities towards cooperators and the Polish national Social Insurance Institution (ZUS). Its last editor-in-chief was Wiesław Dębski.

== Circulation ==
The circulation of Trybuna was 48,509 copies in January–February 2001. Its 2009 circulation was 50,000 copies.

== Editors-in-chief ==
Name	Term began	Term ended
Marek Siwiec	1990	1991
Dariusz Szymczycha	1991	1996
Janusz Rolicki	1996	2000
Andrzej Urbańczyk	2000	2001
Wojciech Pielecki	2001	2004
Marek Barański	2004	2005
Wiesław Dębski	2005	2006
Marek Barański	2006	2007
Wiesław Dębski	2007	2009
