= Holy Cross Church, Warsaw =

Roman Catholic church in Warsaw, Poland

Coordinates: 52°14′19″N 21°1′00″E

Holy Cross Church Kościół św. Krzyża (in Polish)
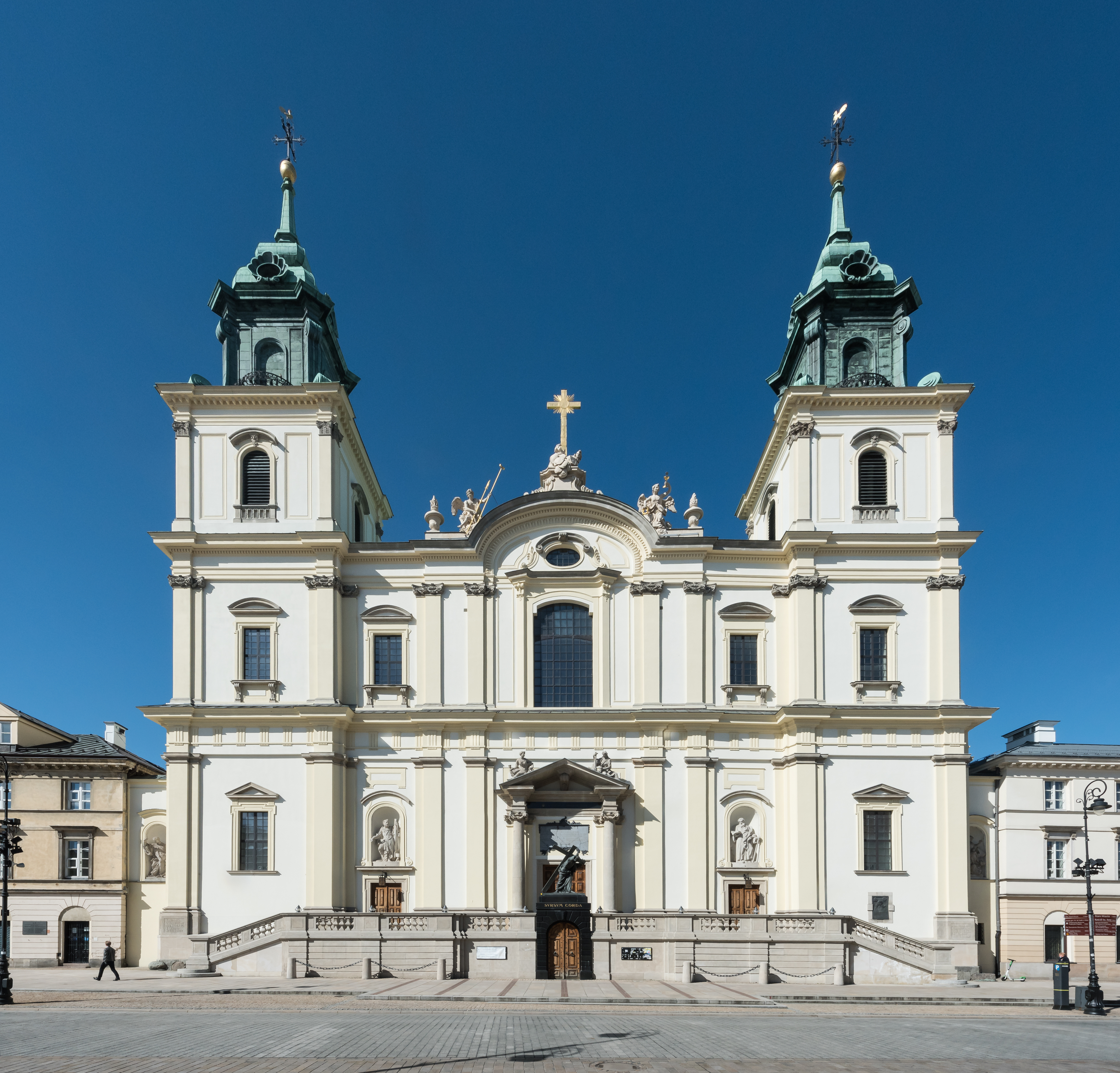
- Church façade (center), 2021.

General information
- Architectural style: Baroque
- Location: Warsaw, Poland
- Construction started: 1682
- Completed: 1757
- Demolished: 1944
- Client: Michał Stefan Radziejowski

Design and construction
- Architect: Józef Fontana

Historic Monument of Poland
- Designated: 1994-09-08
- Part of: Warsaw – historic city center with the Royal Route and Wilanów
- Reference no.: M.P. 1994 nr 50 poz. 423

The Church of the Holy Cross (Polish: Bazylika Świętego Krzyża) is a Roman Catholic church in central Warsaw, Poland. It is located on Krakowskie Przedmieście, opposite the main Warsaw University campus. One of the most notable Baroque churches in Poland's capital, its interior contains the embalmed heart of composer Frédéric Chopin. The Holy Cross Church is currently administered by friars belonging to the Congregation of the Mission of Vincent de Paul.

== History ==
As early as the 15th century, a small wooden chapel of the Holy Cross had been erected here. In 1526 the chapel was demolished, and a newer church was erected. Refurbished and extended by Paweł Zembrzuski in 1615, the church was too small to fill the needs of the growing city. Initially located well outside the city limits, by the 17th century it had become one of the main churches in the southern suburb (przedmieście) of the city that had in 1596 become Poland's capital.

In 1653 Queen Marie Louise Gonzaga gave the church to the French order of Missionary Friars of Vincent de Paul. However, three years later Warsaw was captured by Swedish armies during the Deluge. Pillaged, the church was found to be damaged beyond repair. During the reign of King John III Sobieski the church's remnants were demolished, and it was decided to erect a new shrine. In the 18th century this became the origin of the gorzkie żale (Bitter Lamentations) tradition.

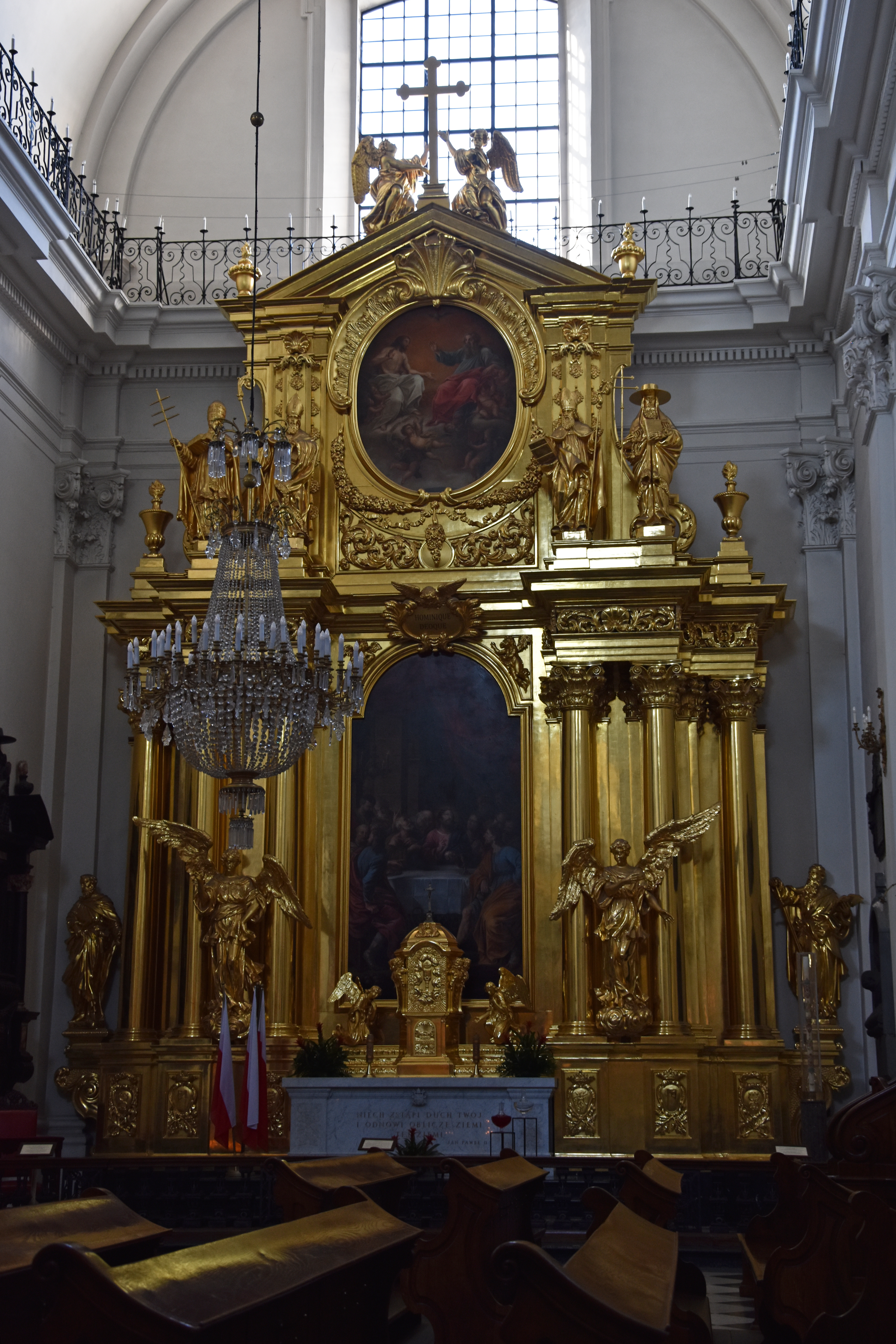
National Altar (Ołtarz Ojczyzny), symbolizing national unity, was built ca. 1700 to a design by Tylman Gamerski.

The main building was constructed between 1679 and 1696. Its main designer was Józef Szymon Bellotti, the royal architect at the Royal Court of Poland. It was financed by abbot Kazimierz Szczuka and the Primate of Poland Michał Stefan Radziejowski. The façade was relatively modest and reminded of Renaissance facades of the nearby churches. The two towers surrounding the façade were initially square-cut. Between 1725 and 1737 two late Baroque headpieces by Józef Fontana. The façade itself was refurbished by Fontana's son, Jakub (in 1756) and ornamented with sculptures by Jan Jerzy Plersch.

From 1765 the church was one of the most attended by Polish King Stanisław II Augustus. It was also there that the King established the Order of St. Stanisław and bestowed it upon loyal servants annually on 8 May. On 3 May 1792 the Polish Diet gathered there on the first anniversary of the 3 May Constitution. During the Warsaw Uprising of 1794, the stairs leading to the main entrance were destroyed and had to be replaced with new ones designed by Chrystian Piotr Aigner.

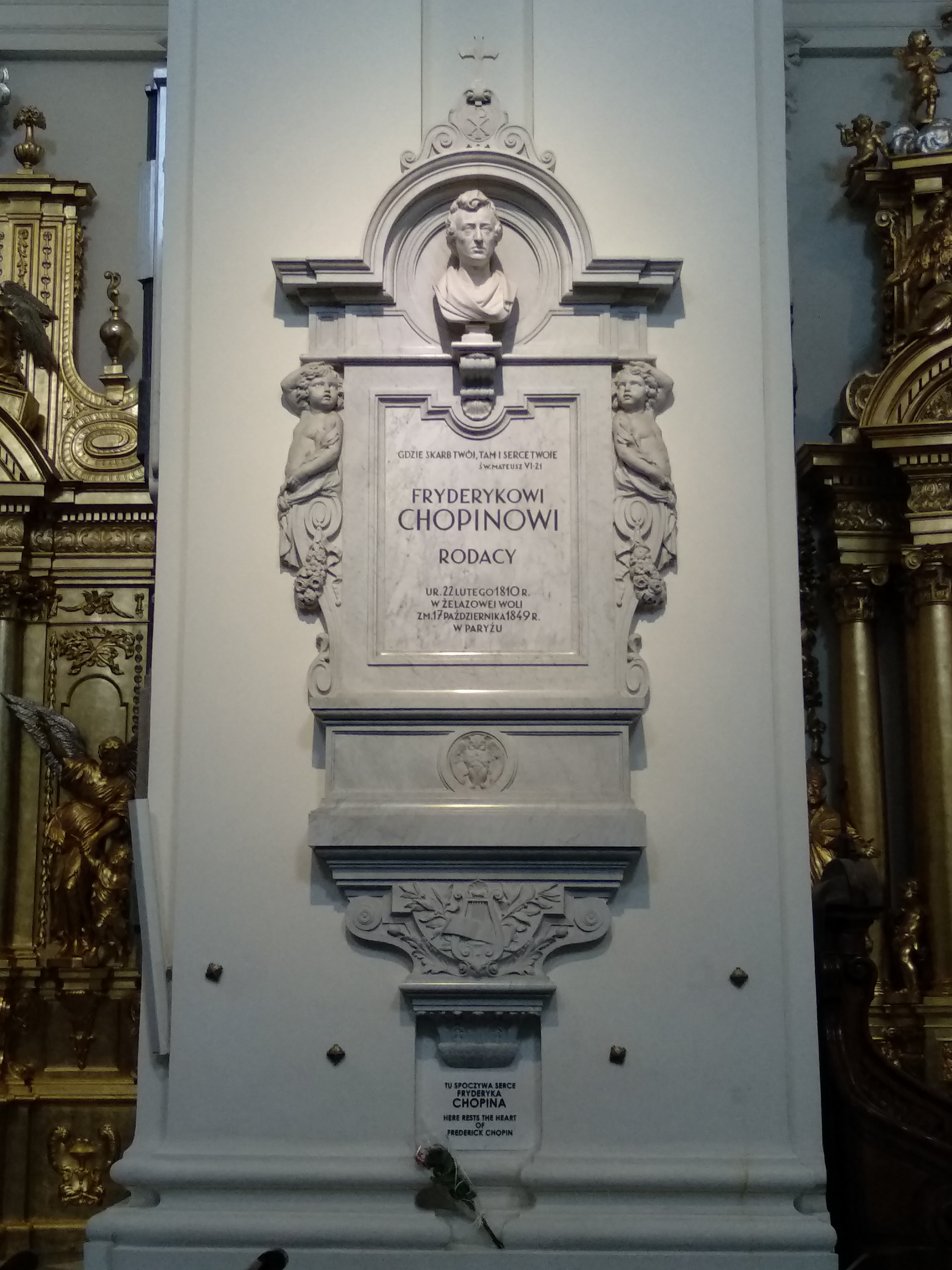
Pillar containing Chopin's heart (just above the bouquet near bottom)

During the Partitions, the church gained much importance, especially after the 1861 demonstration held before it, which was brutally put down by Russian Cossack troops — sparking the January 1863 Uprising.

On Christmas Day 1881, an outbreak of panic following a false alarm of fire in the crowded church caused the stampede deaths of twenty-nine persons. Jews were blamed for starting the panic, and the Warsaw pogrom of 1881 ensued.

In the late 19th century the church interior was slightly refurbished, and in 1882 an urn containing the heart of Frédéric Chopin was immured in a pillar. Some decades later, a similar urn was added with the heart of Władysław Reymont. In 1889 the external staircase leading to the main entrance was reconstructed, and a sculpture of Christ Bearing His Cross by Pius Weloński was added. The sculpture bears the inscription, Sursum Corda ("Lift Up Your Hearts"), signifying the Poles' endurance under the Russian partition. In addition to urns containing the hearts of some of Poland's most renowned artists, there are several epitaphs to other notable Poles of the late 19th and early 20th centuries, including Juliusz Słowacki, Józef Ignacy Kraszewski, Bolesław Prus, and Władysław Sikorski.

=== Destruction and rebuilding ===
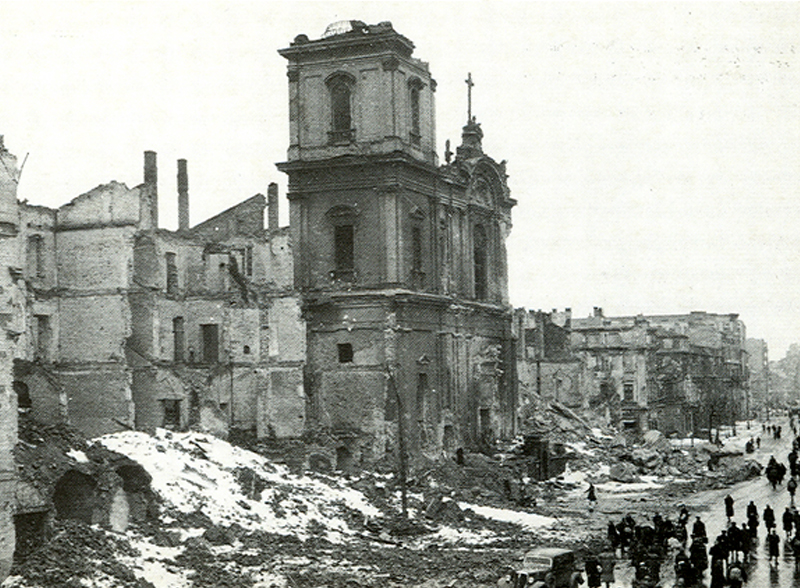
Remains of the Holy Cross Church in 1945

During the 1944 Warsaw Uprising, the church was severely damaged. On 6 September 1944, when the Germans detonated two large Goliath tracked mines in the church (they usually carried 75–100 kg of high explosives) the facade was destroyed, together with many Baroque furnishings, the vaulting, the high altar, and side altars. Afterward the church was blown up by the Germans in January 1945.

After the end of the war in Europe, Polish pianist Henryk Sztompka gave a recital on September 4, 1945, to raise money to rebuild the Holy Cross Church. He played Chopin's Piano Sonata No. 2 (Funeral March) on the composer's own piano, followed by Polonaise in A-flat major, Op. 53. The audience included members of the "Blue Squadron", a group of French Red Cross nurses and ambulance drivers who worked in Poland after the war, including Madeleine Pauliac.

Between 1945 and 1953, the church was rebuilt in a simplified architectural form by B. Zborowski. The interior was reconstructed without the Baroque polychromes and frescos. The main altar was reconstructed between 1960 and 1972.

Traditionally, during the Chopin International Piano Competition on 17 October – the day of Fryderyk Chopin's death – a solemn mass is celebrated in the church, during which Wolfgang Amadeus Mozart's Requiem is performed in accordance with the wishes of the composer.

== Burials ==
Frédéric François Chopin (1810-1849): His heart is interred in the church. His body is buried in Père Lachaise Cemetery, Paris.

== Radio broadcasts ==
Since September 21, 1980, a weekly Mass has been broadcast from here, produced by Polish Radio. On September 19, Cardinal Stefan Wyszyński decided that the Mass would be broadcast from this church and established the Church Editorial Committee for the Broadcast of the Holy Mass at the same location. The choice of the church as the site for the broadcasts was due to its central location in Warsaw, its excellent acoustics, and the fact that radio Masses had already been transmitted from this church between 1930–1939 and 1945–1949. Between 1980 and 1982, the Mass reached listeners via Program II (on medium wave). From 1982 to 1989, it was transmitted on VHF (FM) and longwave through Program IV of Polish Radio, and since 1989, it has been broadcast on longwave via Program I. Following the signing of the Gdańsk Accords between Solidarity and the communist government of the People's Republic of Poland in 1980, it was decided that the Mass would be transmitted nationwide via state-controlled radio. In the protocol of agreement signed on August 31, 1980, between the Government Commission and the Inter-Enterprise Strike Committee in Gdańsk, a clear provision was included:

“The government shall ensure the radio transmission of Sunday Mass, in coordination with the Episcopate.”

Since then, the Mass has been recorded weekly at the church for broadcast. From December 13, 1981, to January 17, 1982, the broadcasting of the Holy Mass was suspended due to the imposition of martial law in Poland. Until 1989, the prepared texts of sermons had to be submitted to state censorship for approval. Today, the Mass can be heard every Sunday at 9:00 a.m. on Program I. In 2020, the Polish Radio website reported that the Holy Mass gathers approximately 5–6 million listeners at their radio receivers each week.

== Images ==
=== Historical ===
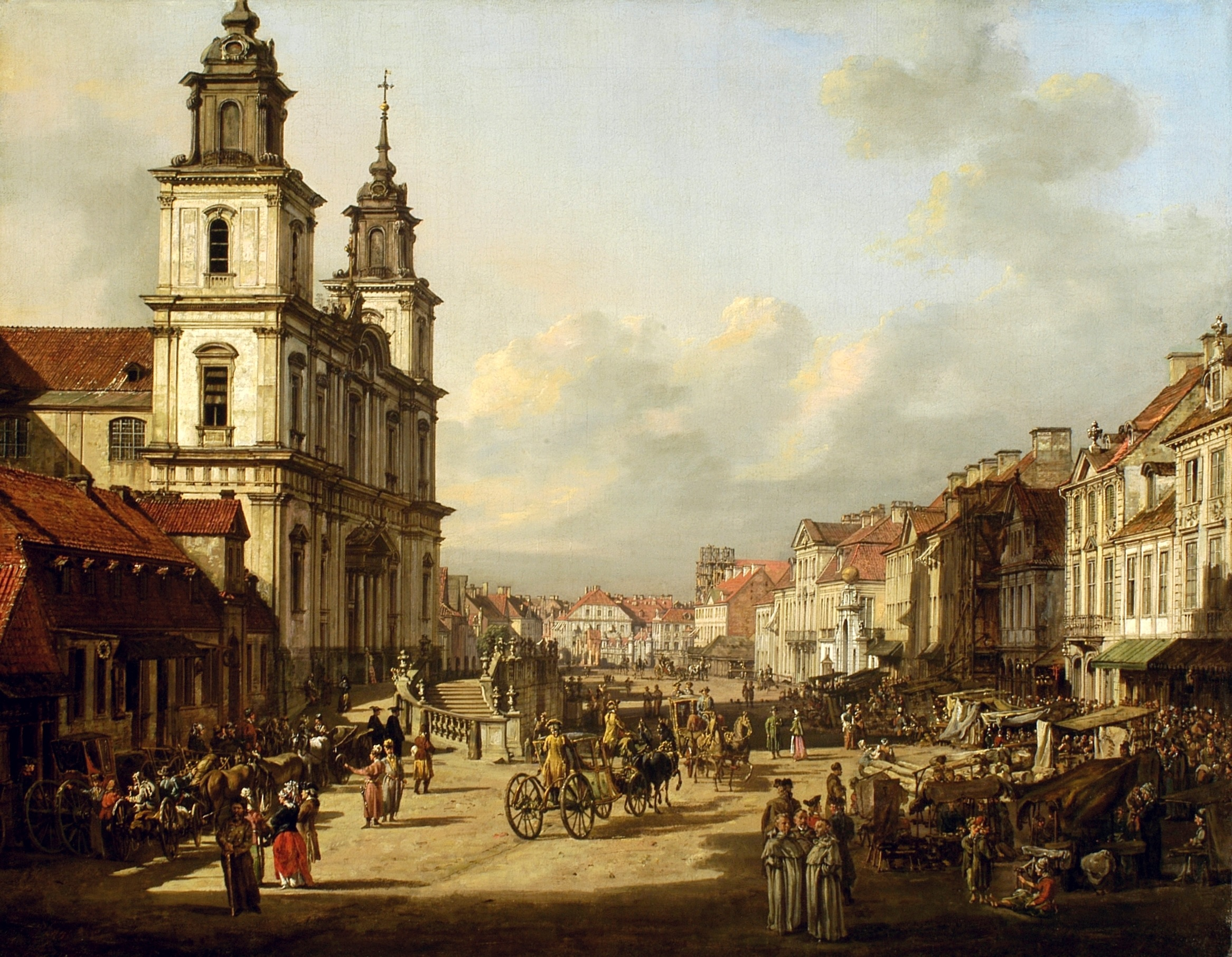
1770s

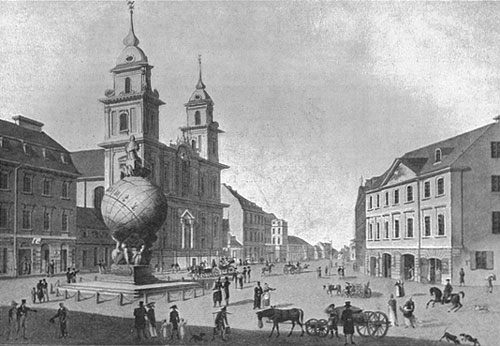
Before 1828

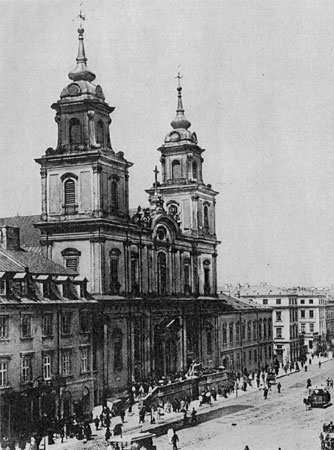
1890s

=== Present day ===
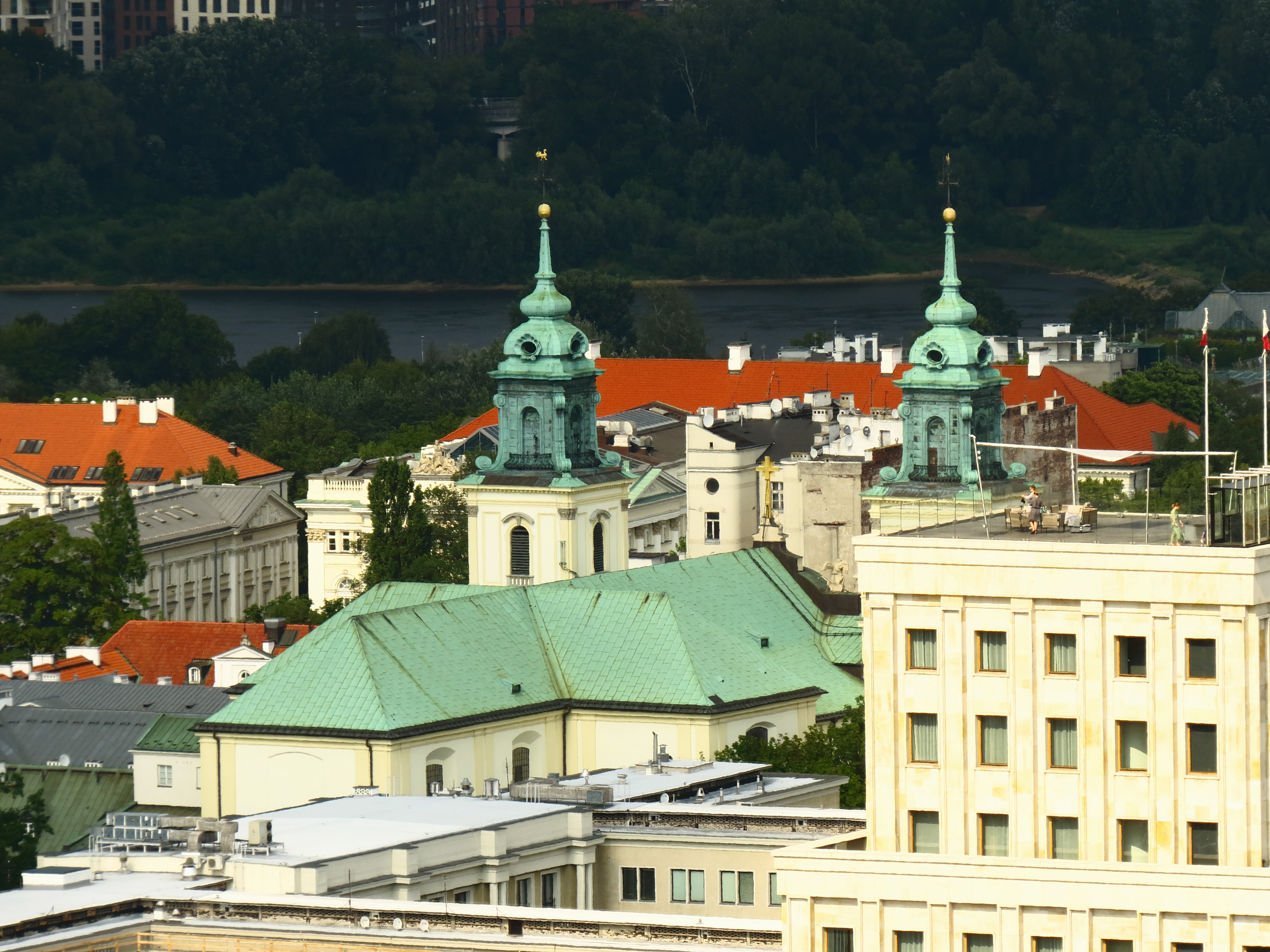
The copper roof and bell towers of the church as seen from the west

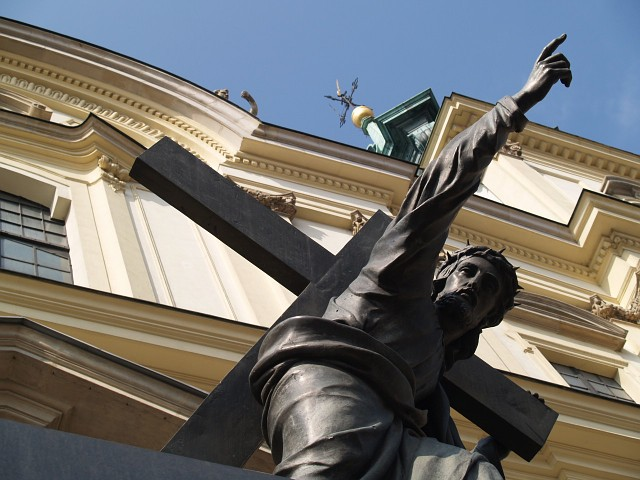
Statue of Christ Christ Bearing His Cross, before the church

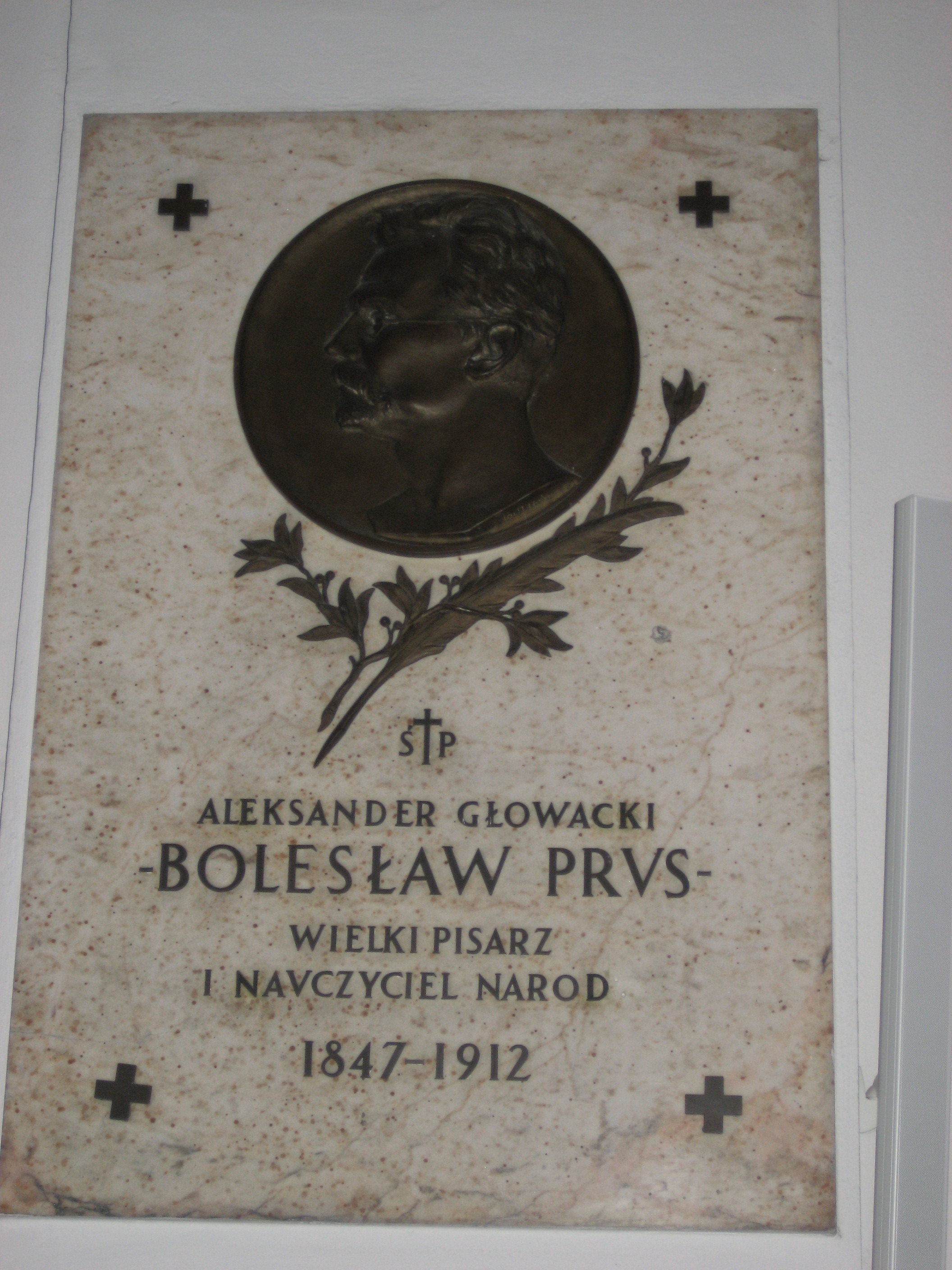
Plaque commemorating Bolesław Prus, "great writer and teacher of the nation, 1847–1912"

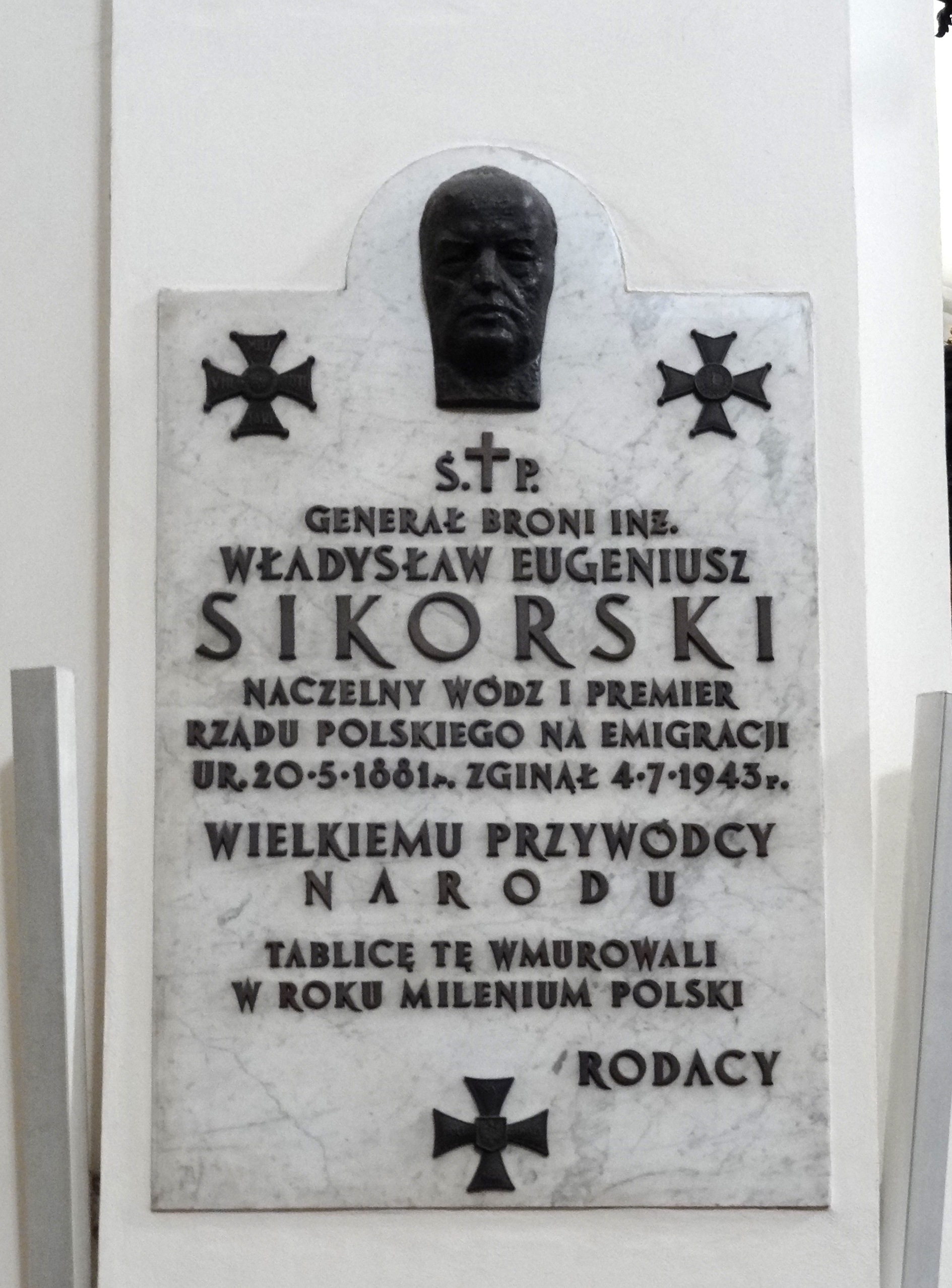
Plaque commemorating Polish general and prime minister Władysław Sikorski

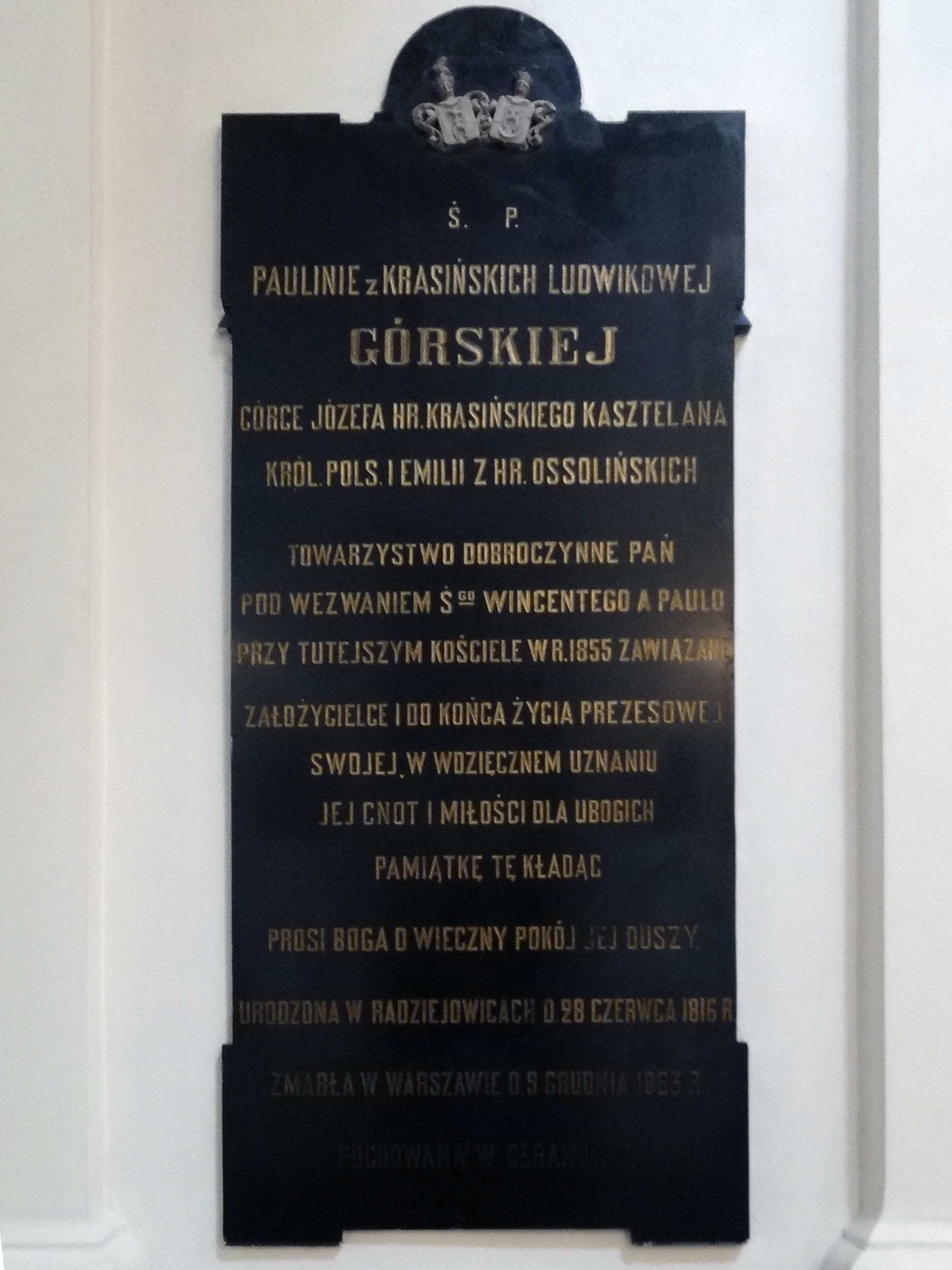
Plaque commemorating Polish duchess, social and charity activist, Paulina Górska née Krasińska (1816-1893)

== See also ==
- St. Casimir's Church
- Marceli Godlewski
- St. Florian's Cathedral
- Visitationist Church

== Notes and references ==
General:

- Franciszek Maksymilian Sobieszczański (November 1863). "Kościół Śto-krzyzki w Warszawie". Tygodnik Ilustrowany (in Polish). VIII (216). Archived from the original on 2015-09-23.
- "kościół pw. św. Krzyża". Architektura Przedwojennej Warszawy (in Polish). Fundacja "WARSZAWA1939.pl". 2005.
