= League of Polish Women =

Liga Kobiet (LK; League of Women) was a state women's organization in Communist Poland between 1945 and 1989. It was originally registered under the name Społeczno-Obywatelskiej Ligi Kobiet (SOLK; Social and Civic League of Women, SCLW) after its founding in 1945 and until 1949. It was called Liga Kobiet between 1949 and 1982, and following 1982, it was henceforth known as Liga Kobiet Polskich (LKP; League of Polish Women).

== Origins and Goals ==
The LK was founded when the Soviet Union installed a communist government in Poland following the end of World War II in 1945. As such, it was a state organization and branch of the Communist Party, the Polish United Workers' Party. It succeeded a pre-war organization founded in 1913 with a similar name, called the Liga Kobiet Polskich (Polish Women's League).

Its initial goals included "helping women cope in the difficult post-war reality" and organizing trainings on employment readiness as women entered the workforce. Over time, however, the goals of the organization evolved. As noted by Polish historian Małgorzata Dajnowicz, who has written many articles focusing specifically on the League, the organization began to emphasize their work on educational and propaganda incentives starting in 1949. In line with the various different groups present in post-war Poland, the League's executive board consisted of members from "trade unions, the Peasant Self-Help Union, military families, youth and social organizations, and cooperatives."

The League published a statute in 1947 that laid out the structure, mission, and governing rules of the organization. Some of their goals included protecting women's rights, supporting families, and providing civic and vocational education. It included outlining a hierarchal system of local and national bodies to coordinate this work, ensuring that the organization was presented as one that was simultaneously women-centered and state-aligned.

== Publication of Women's Magazines ==
Its purpose was to mobilize women in the political ideology of the state, as well as to enforce the party's policy within gender roles and women's rights. It played an important role in the life of women in the state during its existence. The policy of women's rights was progressive, and full legal gender equality was introduced. Although the government supported progressive women's rights, and created full legal gender equality, this agenda was also used to benefit the states. Part of this included the publication of a variety of women's magazines, such as Kobieta (Woman), Kobieta Dzisiejsza (Everyday Woman), and Nasza Praca (Our Work).

The purpose of the magazines was to propagate communist ideology as it pertained specifically to women during the late 1940s and early 1950s, specifically focusing on convincing "readers that the League of Women remained an organization important and useful to Polish women." Additionally, they covered topics such as motherhood, women's labor, and emphasized the relationship between gender equality and professional work.

== Dissolution ==
In 1989, it was dissolved and transformed into a new organization under the name Democratic Union of Women (LK).
