= Trybuna Ludu =

Polish newspaper (1948–1990)

- Headline from 14 December 1981 reporting Martial law in Poland
- Type: Daily newspaper
- Format: Broadsheet
- Owner: Polish United Workers' Party (PZPR)
- Publisher: Warszawa : Central Committee of PZPR
- Founded: 16 December 1948
- Ceased publication: 28 January 1990
- Political alignment: Communist; Socialist
- Language: Polish
- Headquarters: Warsaw, Poland
- Country: Poland
- Circulation: 1,900,000 (1989)
- OCLC number: 2268743

Trybuna Ludu (Polish pronunciation: [trɨˈbuna ˈludu]; People's Tribune) was one of the largest newspapers in communist Poland, which circulated between 1948 and 1990. It was the official media outlet of the Polish United Workers' Party (PZPR) along with the televised news program Dziennik.

== History ==
=== Creation ===
On 16 December 1948, Poland's two largest communist parties, the Polish Socialist Party and the Polish Workers' Party, were combined to form the Polish United Workers' Party. The parties' respective newspapers, Robotnik, and Głos Ludu, were merged as well, forming the Trybuna Ludu.

=== Significance ===
Through the 20th century, the media in Poland were entirely controlled by the PZPR and newspapers were no exception. Trybuna Ludu and its smaller competitors promoted the party line. This newspaper had a significant role in spreading Communism during the communist domination in the Polish People's Republic. It was also responsible for "rewriting history".

As the official party newspaper, Trybuna Luda dominated the market. By the end of 1981, circulation topped 1 million. Despite growing opposition to the party, the number of Trybuna Ludu subscribers continued to grow and reached nearly 1.9 million by the time the communist state was dissolved.

=== Party dissolution and aftermath ===
The break-up of the PZPR began on 28 January 1990, just hours after the final issue of Trybuna Ludu was printed. Despite an attempted relaunch as Trybuna Kongresowa, the paper was unable to survive the fall of communism in Poland.

After 1990, much of its editorial was taken over unofficially by Trybuna, a newly-created left-wing newspaper. Even at its peak, Trybuna had just 50,000 readers, and could not make money. Printing was halted in late 2009.

== Editors-in-chief ==
| Name | Term began | Term ended |
|---|---|---|
| Leon Kasman | 1948 | 1953 |
| Władysław Matwin | 1953 | 1957 (Note: Matwin was absent for a short while in 1956. During that time, Roman Werfel, Jerzy Morawski, and Walenty Titkow served as acting chief editors.) |
| Leon Kasman | 1957 | 1967 |
| Stanisław Mojkowski | 1967 | 1972 |
| Józef Barecki | 1972 | 1980 |
| Wiesław Bek | 1980 | 1985 |
| Jerzy Majka | 1985 | 1990 |

== See also ==
- Eastern Bloc information dissemination
- Sztandar Młodych
- Köhler, Piotr (2016). "Lysenkoist Propaganda in Trybuna Ludu" (PDF). Studies in the History of Biology. 8 (3): 25–42.
- "LC Catalog: Trybuna ludu – organ Komitetu Centralnego Polskiej Zjednoczonej Partii Robotniczej". Washington, DC: Library of Congress.
