= Władysław Matwin =

Polish diplomat (1916–2012)

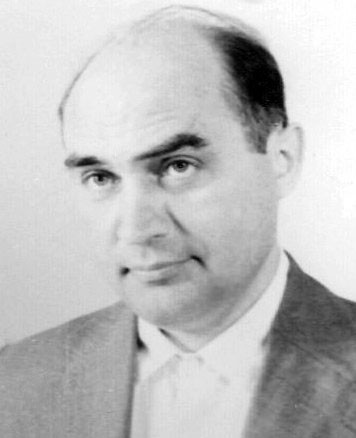
- Władysław Matwin in Trybuna Ludu, 1959

Chairman of the Union of Polish Youth
- In office 1949–1952
- Prime Minister: Bolesław Bierut
- Preceded by: Janusz Zarzycki
- Succeeded by: Stanisław Nowocień

1st Secretary of Warsaw PZPR City Committee
- In office December 1952 – February 1954
- Preceded by: Władysław Wicha
- Succeeded by: Stanisław Pawlak

Editor-in-chief of Trybuna Ludu
- In office 1953–1957
- Preceded by: Leon Kasman
- Succeeded by: Leon Kasman

Personal details
- Born: 17 July 1916 Będzin, Congress Poland, Russian Empire
- Died: 21 October 2012 (aged 96) Warsaw, Poland
- Party: Polish United Workers' Party
- Profession: Politician
- Awards: Order of Polonia Restituta

Władysław Matwin (17 July 1916 – 21 October 2012) was a Polish politician, journalist and mathematician who was one of the pioneers of computer science in Poland.

== Biography ==
After his parents divorced, he and his mother found themselves in Poznań, where he studied economics. At that time he belonged to the Communist Party of Poland and the Young Communist League of Poland (KZMP). He was secretary of the KZMP District Committee. In January 1935, he was arrested for Communist activities and sentenced to three years in prison. After being released, he went to Czechoslovakia, where he studied chemistry in Brno. He returned to Poland in the spring of 1939. He volunteered to join the army, but was considered a dangerous criminal and was banned from serving in the Polish army.

During World War II he stayed on the territory of the Soviet Union. First, he worked as a miner and later studied at the Metallurgy Institute at night. For a short time he was in the Red Army, from which - due to his origin - he was removed. Later he worked in railway construction. He then stayed in Tbilisi. Later he joined First Polish Army army in Ryazan, where he taught politics at the officer's school. In 1944 he belonged to the corps of political and educational officers of the 1st Tadeusz Kościuszko Infantry Division. In 1944 he was sent to Tehran, where the Union of Polish Patriots (in which he was active) created an outpost whose main task was to reach the local Polish community through radio broadcasts and newspapers, and above all the soldiers of Władysław Anders.

In 1945, Władysław Matwin was summoned to Moscow, where he became chargé d'affaires at the Polish embassy. In 1946 he returned to Poland and served as an instructor of the Central Committee. In 1947 and 1948 he was the first secretary of the Provincial Committee of the Polish Workers' Party in Wrocław. He also stayed for a year in Davos, Switzerland, where he had his eyes treated (he was in danger of losing his sight as a result of disease). Together with the PPR, he joined the Polish United Workers' Party, sitting until June 1964 in its Central Committee (he also held the position of the first secretary of the Provincial Committee in Wrocław, which he held until 1949). In the 1950s, he was associated with the Puławy faction.

From 1949 to 1952 he was the chairman of the Main Board of the Union of Polish Youth. From December 1952 to February 1954 he was the first secretary of the Warsaw Committee of the PZPR. From 1954 to March 1956 and again from November 1956 to March 1957 he was editor-in-chief of Trybuna Ludu. From November 1954 to January 1955 he headed the Organizational Department of the Central Committee of the PZPR, and then until November 1963 he was secretary of the Central Committee (until March 1956 responsible for education ). In 1957, he was again sent to Wrocław, where he took the position of the First Secretary of the Provincial Committee of the PZPR, holding the position until his retirement from politics 1963.

In 1963 he began studying mathematics and in 1966 he obtained a diploma in automata theory. The following year, he became the director of the Central Center for Management Staff Improvement, but in 1968 he lost this position for not agreeing to the demand to remove employees of Jewish origin from the institute. He took the job of a senior technologist in Włochy, and in 1970 - at the Institute of Mathematical Machines; in 1973 he became the director of the Department of Electronic Computing Technology. From 1976 to 1991 he worked part-time at the Systems Research Institute of the Polish Academy of Sciences.

Władysław Matwin died in October 2012, being one of the last remaining politicians of the pre-war Polish Communist Party.
