= Puławians =

Puławians Puławianie
- Leader: Roman Zambrowski; Leon Kasman; Mieczysław Rakowski; Władysław Gomułka
- Founded: February 1956; 70 years ago
- Dissolved: October 1956; 69 years ago
- Ideology: Communism; Marxism–Leninism; Anti-Stalinism; Marxist Reformism (soft); Left-wing nationalism; Polish road to socialism; Pro-Thaw
- Political position: Left-wing to far-left
- National affiliation: PZPR

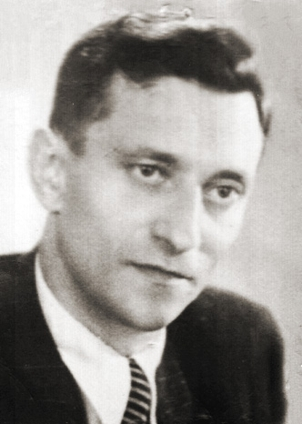
Roman Zambrowski, a leader of the Puławy Street faction

The Puławians, or the Puławy faction (Polish: Puławianie, frakcja puławska), as they came to be informally dubbed, comprised one of two principal communist groupings in Stalinist Poland which – in the spring of 1956, following the death of Bolesław Bierut – vied for power within the leadership of the Polish United Workers' Party (PZPR). The Puławians were known, during Poland's destalinization process, as reformists.

The other – a hardliner – grouping were dubbed the Natolinians (Natolińczycy), or the Natolin faction.

The Puławy faction included many communists of Jewish extraction Among the most prominent were Roman Zambrowski and Leon Kasman. Others included Stefan Staszewski and Adam Schaff. However, the Puławians also included prominent party and state functionaries of Polish ethnicity such as Edward Gierek, Piotr Jaroszewicz, Henryk Jabłoński, Mieczysław Rakowski, Andrzej Werblan, Janusz Zarzycki, Władysław Matwin, Adam Rapacki and Oskar Lange.

The name "Puławy faction" came from the addresses of the Warsaw apartment buildings at Puławska Street 24 and 26, which had survived the Germans' planned destruction of Warsaw in World War II. The apartments were occupied mainly by high communist party officials, including supporters of the Puławy Street faction. The Natolin Palace faction called them, by an uncomplimentary version of the word, “the Jews.”

Witold Jedlicki describes the struggle between the Natolinians and Puławians in his Simpletons and Yids. (Chamy i Żydy)

Some children of Puławians would later be involved in Poland's March 1968 political crisis.

== See also ==
- 1968 Polish political crisis
- Żydokomuna
- Władysław Gomułka
- Mieczysław Moczar
- Natolin faction
- Aleksander Zawadzki
- Endokomuna
