= Leon Kasman =

Polish journalist and politician

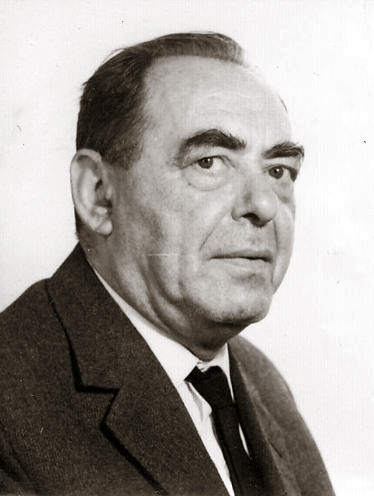

Chief editor of Trybuna Ludu
- In office 8 September 1944 – December 1953

Personal details
- Born: 28 October 1905 Łódź, Congress Poland, Russian Empire (today Poland)
- Died: 12 July 1984 (aged 78) Warsaw, Poland
- Resting place: Powązki Military Cemetery
- Citizenship: Poland
- Party: Polish United Worker's Party

Leon Kasman, pseudonyms "Adam," "Bolek," "Janowski," "Zygmunt" (28 October 1905 – 12 July 1984) was a Polish communist journalist and politician of Jewish descent. Head of the propaganda and agitation department of the Central Committee of the Polish Workers' Party.

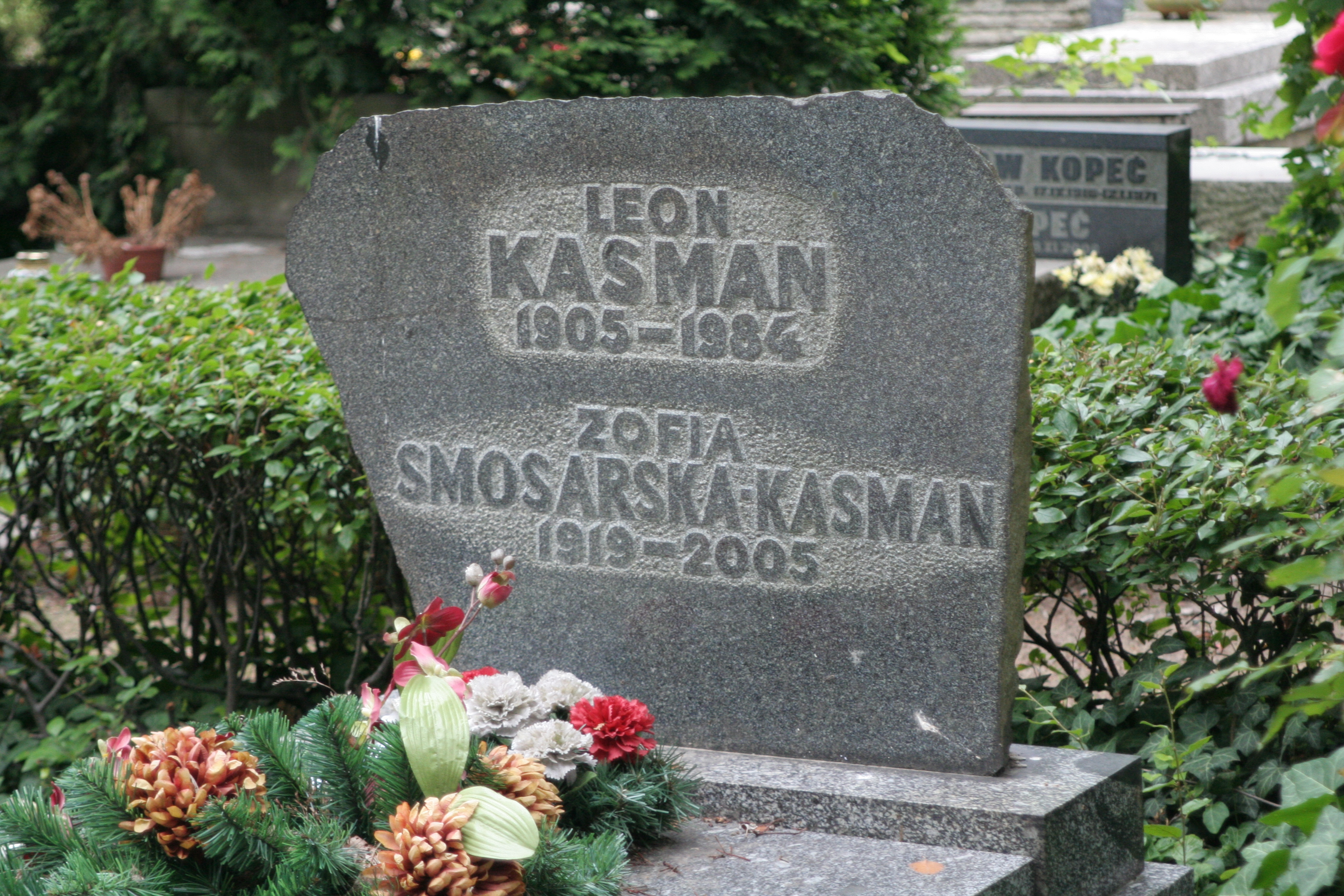
Leon Kasman’s tombstone in Warsaw.

He was a first editor-in-chief of the Trybuna Ludu daily, deputy to the Sejm of the Polish People's Republic. As a result of the conflicts within the communist party, Kasman resigned from this function in December 1953. He was among the “Puławianie" faction in PZPR. Leon Kasman died in 1984 and was buried at the Powązki Military Cemetery in Warsaw.

== See also ==
- Natolinian faction
- 1968 Polish political crisis
- Władysław Gomułka
- Roman Zambrowski
