= Stanisław Tołwiński =

Polish engineer, activist and politician (1895–1969)

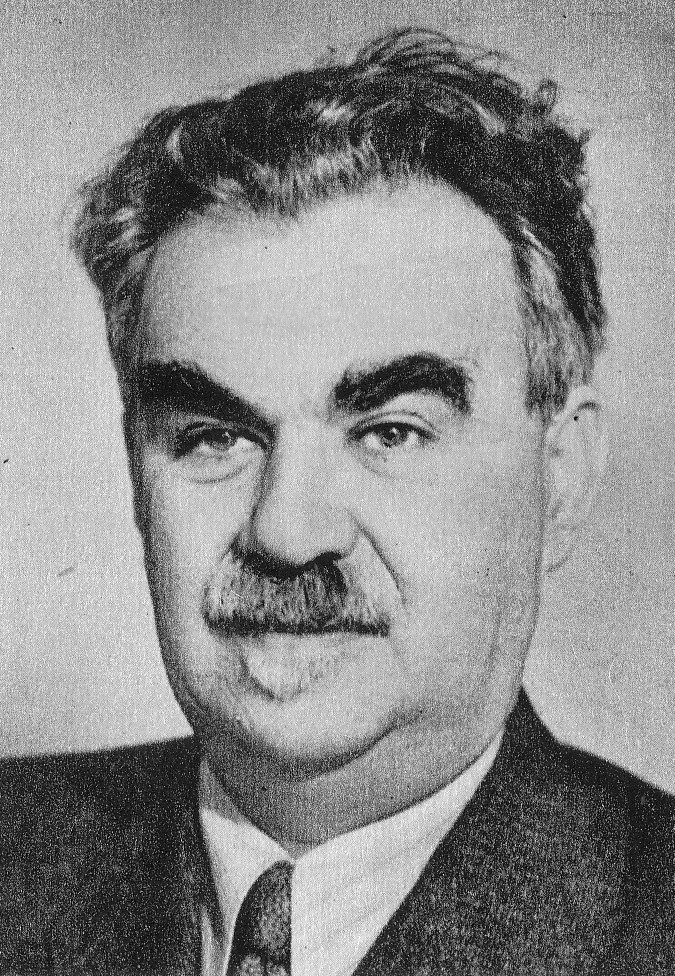

Mayor of Warsaw
- In office 5 March 1945 – 23 May 1950
- Preceded by: Marian Spychalski
- Succeeded by: Jerzy Albrecht

Personal details
- Born: 11 October 1895 Przemyśl, Poland
- Died: 25 February 1969 (aged 73) Warsaw
- Resting place: Powązki Military Cemetery
- Party: PZPR
- Education: Saint Petersburg State Institute of Technology
- Awards: Order of Polonia Restituta; Cross of Merit; Medal for Warsaw 1939–1945; Hungarian Order of Merit; Righteous Among the Nations; Badge of Honour "For Merit to Warsaw"

Stanisław Tołwiński (born October 11, 1895, in Strzemieszyce, died February 25, 1969, in Warsaw) was a Polish engineer, social and cooperative activist and a politician who served as Mayor of Warsaw from 1945 to 1950. He received the title Righteous Among the Nations.

== Biography ==
He was born in 1895. His father's family came from impoverished Podlachia nobility from the Drohiczyn district, where the village of Tołwin was located. His father, Kazimierz, a mechanical engineer, moved with his family to the Donets Basin in search of work, and later to Slaviansk, where Stanisław Tołwiński spent his youth.

From 1912 to 1915, he studied at the Faculty of Mechanical Engineering of the Institute of Technology in St. Petersburg. At that time, he was active in the illegal Union of Progressive-Independence Youth ("Filaretii") and the Polish Socialist Party – Revolutionary Faction, for which he was imprisoned by the tsarist authorities from 1915 to 1917.

He was released from prison just before the outbreak of the February Revolution in Russia in 1917. After returning to Slaviansk, he was active in the Polish Socialist Union and then in the local section of the Polish Socialist Party. During the October Revolution, he participated in the Second Conference of the PPS Section in Kyiv, which supported the Bolshevik coup. He was a member of the Council of Workers' Deputies in Slaviansk and served as commissar for national affairs, providing assistance to war refugees. In April 1918, he left Slaviansk, crossed the front line, and reached Warsaw.

After returning to Poland, he was active in the Polish Socialist Party. At the same time, he was involved in the creation (1919) and activities of the Union of Workers' Cooperative Associations (later the Union of Workers' Consumer Cooperatives). From 1919 to 1921 and 1924, he served as a member of the Union's board. He co-founded the Warsaw Housing Cooperative (WSM) and its associated Social Construction Company (SPB). From 1925 to 1939, he served as a member of the WSM board.M

In October 1923, following the explosion of ammunition warehouses in the Citadel, he was arrested for several days as part of police repression against alleged communist sympathizers.

During the defense of Warsaw in September 1939, following an appeal by Roman Umiastowski, he left the city. Upon his return, he became involved in the Workers' Party of Polish Socialists. In 1940, he led the establishment of the Architectural and Urban Planning Studio at the Warsaw School of Economics. He also participated in the work of the Planning Commission of the underground State National Council. During the Warsaw Uprising, he initiated the establishment of the Żoliborz Residents' Self-Government, chairing its board. He also founded the Żoliborz Republic, which provided assistance to residents and those in need.

During the German occupation, he used his position as director of the SPB to provide assistance to Jews seeking refuge on the "Aryan" side. He employed them at the SPB, obtained "Aryan" identity cards, the required documents certifying professional experience, and found housing. In August 1944, he sent his Jewish employees to the company's branches outside Warsaw.

In 1945, he served as Deputy Minister of Public Administration.

From March 5, 1945, to May 23, 1950, he served as Mayor of Warsaw and simultaneously as Chairman of the National Council of the Capital City of Warsaw (under the Act of March 20, 1950, on Local Bodies of Unitary State Authority, the office of mayor was abolished in favor of a collegial body, the Presidium of the National Council of the Capital City of Warsaw). He was an enthusiast of local government and the decentralization of power in the city. In July 1945, as Mayor of Warsaw, he joined the Warsaw Capital Committee for the Commemoration of the First Anniversary of the August Uprising.

From 1945 to 1947, he served as a member of the State National Council, and subsequently as a member of the Legislative Sejm and the First Term Sejm from the Bydgoszcz Voivodeship.

From 1950 to 1952, he served as Director General for National Councils at the Presidium of the Council of Ministers. From 1953 to 1967, he served as deputy head of the Office of the Council of Ministers.

From 1946, he was a member of the Polish Workers' Party (PPR), later the Polish United Workers' Party (PZPR). He was an activist in the Polish-Swedish Friendship Society, serving for a time as its chairman. He published extensively in specialized journals.

He was buried in the Alley of the Meritorious at the Powązki Military Cemetery (section A2-tuje-18).

His memoirs from the years 1895–1939 were published posthumously in 1970. In April 1997, the Yad Vashem Institute awarded him the title of Righteous Among the Nations.

His daughter Zyta was married to Henryk Podlaski, Deputy Prosecutor General in 1950–1955.
