= Dorota Kłuszyńska =

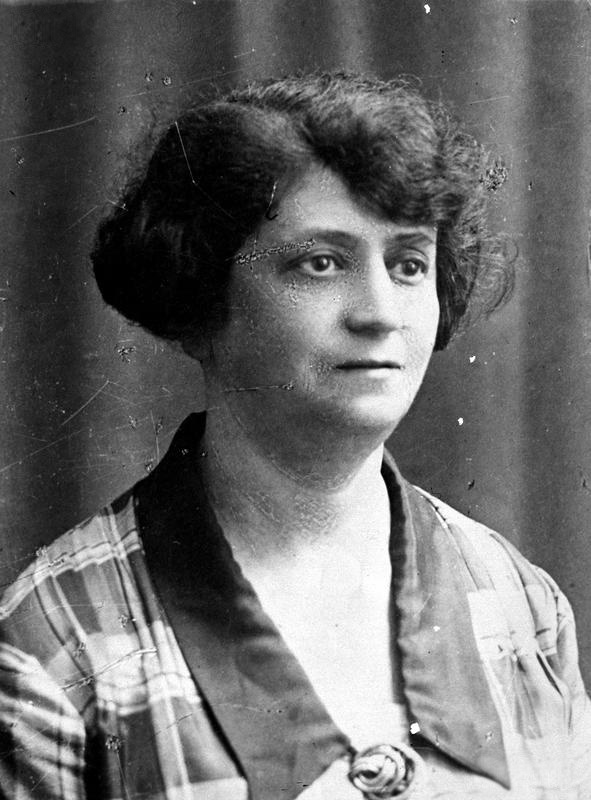
Dorota Kłuszyńska

Dorota (Dora) Kłuszyńska, née Pilcer (1 January 1876 – 22 November 1952), was a Polish socialist politician, activist and feminist. She was a senator during the first, second and third term in 1925–1935, deputy to the Legislative Sejm and the Seym of the People's Republic of Poland in the first term in the years 1947–1952.

== Biography ==
She was born in Tarnów to a Jewish family as Dora Pilcer, daughter of Ignacy Pilcer and Barbara. She graduated from the folk school and then from the faculty school in Tarnów. In the years 1893–1895 she was a student at the Faculty of Economics of the University of Vienna. In 1896, she married Henryk Kłuszyński, a doctor and a socialist activist. In 1900 she joined the Polish Social Democratic Party of Galicia, and in 1911–1919 she was a member of the board and the Central Executive Committee of the party. She organized and spread the socialist women's movement in Poland. She was the editor of Głos Kobiet (1907–1914). In 1908, she organized the first International Women's Day celebrations in Poland. In 1912 participant of the 2nd International Conference of Women Socialists in Copenhagen. She authored the brochure "Why Women Fight for Political Rights" (1912).

During World War I, she was active in the Women's League of Galicia and Silesia from 1915, and in the years 1916–1918 she was a member of its General Board. In the years 1914–1919 she was the chairwoman of the Central Women's Department of the Polish Socialist Party. In the years 1918–1920 she was a member of the National Council of the Duchy of Cieszyn. On January 23, 1919, she participated in the defense of the station in Bogumin against the advancing Czechoslovak army. She also participated in the National Council delegation to the conference in Paris.

In the interwar period, she lived with her husband in Łódź (1921–1927) and Warsaw. She was active in the Polish Socialist Party as a member of the Supreme Council and in the years 1928–1939 as a member of the Central Committee of the Polish Socialist Party. After the split of Rajmund Jaworowski, she rebuilt the Warsaw organization of the PPS. In the years 1919–1939 she was also the president or vice-president of the Central Women's Department of the Polish Socialist Party. She was also an editor of the "Women's Voice" and "Vocational Social Welfare". Kłuszyńska was also active in the international socialist movement - from 1928 as a representative of the Polish Socialist Party in the Second International. She sat in numerous socialist social organizations, including the Society of the Workers' University as a member of the Main Board and chairwoman of the Warsaw branch, the Workers' Society of Friends of Children, and the Workers' Society of Social Service. She also worked together with Justyna Budzińska-Tylicka and Herman Rubinraut at the Conscious Motherhood Clinic founded by Tadeusz Żeleński.

At the outbreak of World War II, she was in Lviv. In 1939 she was briefly arrested by the Soviet authorities. Then she hid until 1942 in Warsaw, and then in the village near Grójec, where she participated in secret teachings. From 1943, she was a member of the Central Leadership of the Movement of the Polish Socialist Party - Freedom, Equality, Independence. In 1945, together with Zygmunt Żuławski, she participated in the creation of the Polish Social and Democratic Party separate from the PPS Lublin.

After an unsuccessful attempt to legalize the latter, it operated in the so-called "Lublin" PPS and above all in the Society of Friends of Children. As a member of the Legislative Sejm (1947–1952), elected in 1947 from District 34 (Gniezno), she sat on the committees of Labor and Social Welfare, Tax and Budgetary Affairs and Foreign Affairs. From 1948 she was a member of the Polish United Workers' Party. She belonged to the Central Committee of the PZPR, but it was a purely formal participation and after her death the Central Committee of the PZPR did not even include an obituary. In 1952 she obtained a parliamentary seat in constituency No. 2 (Pruszków), but she did not take the oath. She died two days after the beginning of her term of office. She was buried at the Powązki Military Cemetery in Warsaw.

== Selected publications ==
- Ważność zagadnień kobiecych (The importance of women's issues), in: Czy kobieta ma być wyzwoloną czy niewolnicą? (Whether woman is to be liberated or a slave?), Warszawa 1937.
- RTPD 1919–1939. Okres pionierski, Warszawa 1947
- Co Polska Ludowa dała kobietom, Warszawa 1950.
- Walkę z alkoholizmem wygramy! : (zarys programu walki z alkoholizmem), Warszawa 1950.
