= Roman Zambrowski =

Polish politician

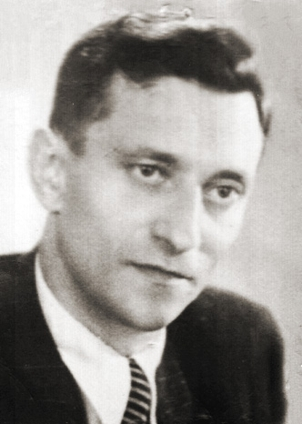

Member of the Politburo of the Polish United Worker's Party
- In office 1948–1963

Minister of State Control
- In office 16 April 1955 – 24 October 1956
- Preceded by: Franciszek Jóźwiak
- Succeeded by: Jan Górecki

Deputy Marshal of the Sejm
- In office 4 February 1947 – 4 August 1952

Personal details
- Born: 23 December 1913 Warsaw, Congress Poland, Russian Empire (today Poland)
- Died: 19 August 1977 (aged 68) Warsaw, Poland
- Resting place: Powązki Military Cemetery
- Citizenship: Poland
- Party: Polish United Worker's Party

Military service
- Allegiance: Polish People's Republic
- Branch/service: Polish People's Army
- Years of service: 1943-1945
- Rank: Pułkownik (Colonel)
- Battles/wars: Second World War

Roman Zambrowski (15 July 1909 – 19 August 1977) was a Polish communist politician.

== Career ==
Zambrowski was born into a Jewish family in Warsaw. He was a member of the Communist Party of Poland (1928–1938) and of the Central Committee of the Young Communist League of Poland (1930–1938). During World War II in the Soviet Union, he was one of the main organisers and leaders of the Union of Polish Patriots (ZPP) from 1943 and of the Central Bureau Communists of Poland (CBKP) in 1944. He was the head of the Political and Educational Leadership of the First Polish Army (1944–1945).

From 1944, Zambrowski was a member and one of the leaders of the Polish Workers' Party (PPR) and then, from 1948 to 1968, of the Polish United Workers' Party (PZPR). He was in the PZPR's Central Committee (1948–1964) and held the office of the secretary of the Central Committee (1948–1954 and 1956–1963). He was in the PZPR's Politburo from 1948 to 1963. In 1956, he was a leader of the faction in the PZPR known as Puławianie. Zambrowski was a deputy in the State National Council (1944–1947) and then in the Sejm (1947–1965), where he was Deputy-marshal of the Sejm (1947–1952). In 1945–1954, he was the chairman of a special commission for combating economically harmful activities and misconduct; in 1963–1968 vice-president of the Supreme Audit Office (NIK).

Zambrowski was accused of inspiring the 1968 Polish political crisis and of Zionist affiliations; in 1968 he was expelled from the PZPR and removed from the vice-presidency of the NIK.

== Later life and legacy ==
He is the father of journalist Antoni Zambrowski. Antoni Zambrowski died in 2019.

A collection of Zambrowski's journals and other writings about Poland and Polska Zjednoczona Partia Robotnicza are held in the collection of the Hoover Institution.

== Awards and decorations ==
- Order of the Banner of Labour, 1st Class (1959)
- Commander's Cross with Star of the Order of Polonia Restituta (22 July 1947)
- Silver Medal for Merit on the Field of Glory (11 November 1943)
- Medal for Warsaw 1939–1945 (17 January 1946)
- Order of the Red Star (USSR, 11 November 1943)

== See also ==
- Puławians
- Leon Kasman
