= Wujec =

Wujec is a surname. Notable people with the surname include:

- Henryk Wujec (1940–2020), Polish politician
- Ludwika Wujec (1941–2024), Polish physicist, teacher, politician, and political activist
- Tom Wujec (born 1959), Canadian author and editor
