= Julian Godlewski =

Polish lawyer (1903–1983)

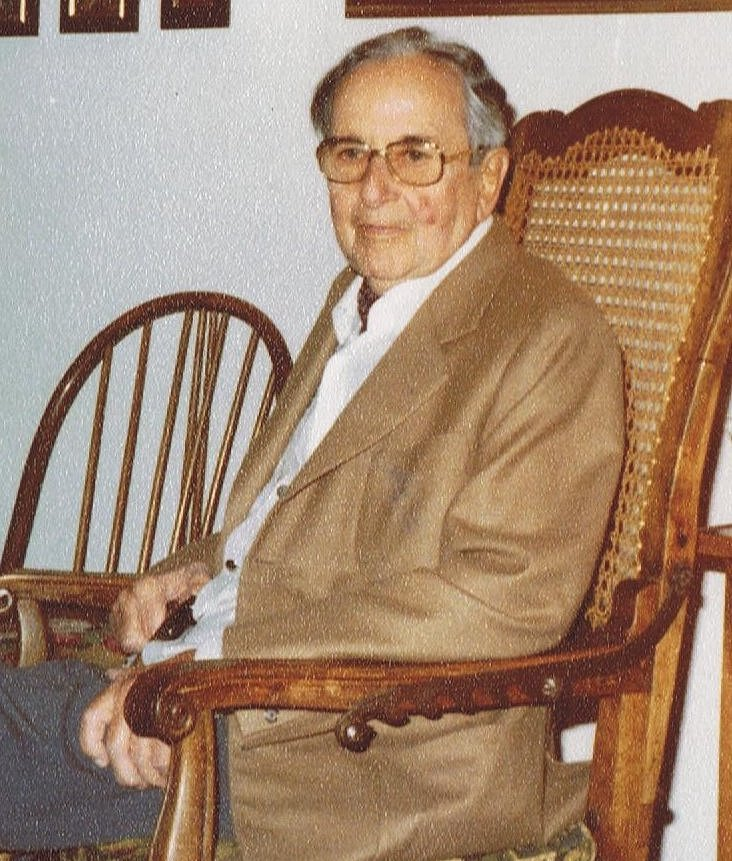
- Julian Godlewski (1982)
- Born: Julian August Godlewski; August 17, 1903; Lviv, Poland
- Died: February 4, 1983 (aged 79); Warsaw, Poland
- Burial place: Powązki Military Cemetery, Warsaw
- Education: Faculty of Law at the University of Lviv
- Occupations: Lawyer; businessman; philanthropist
- Relatives: Julian Zachariewicz (grandfather)

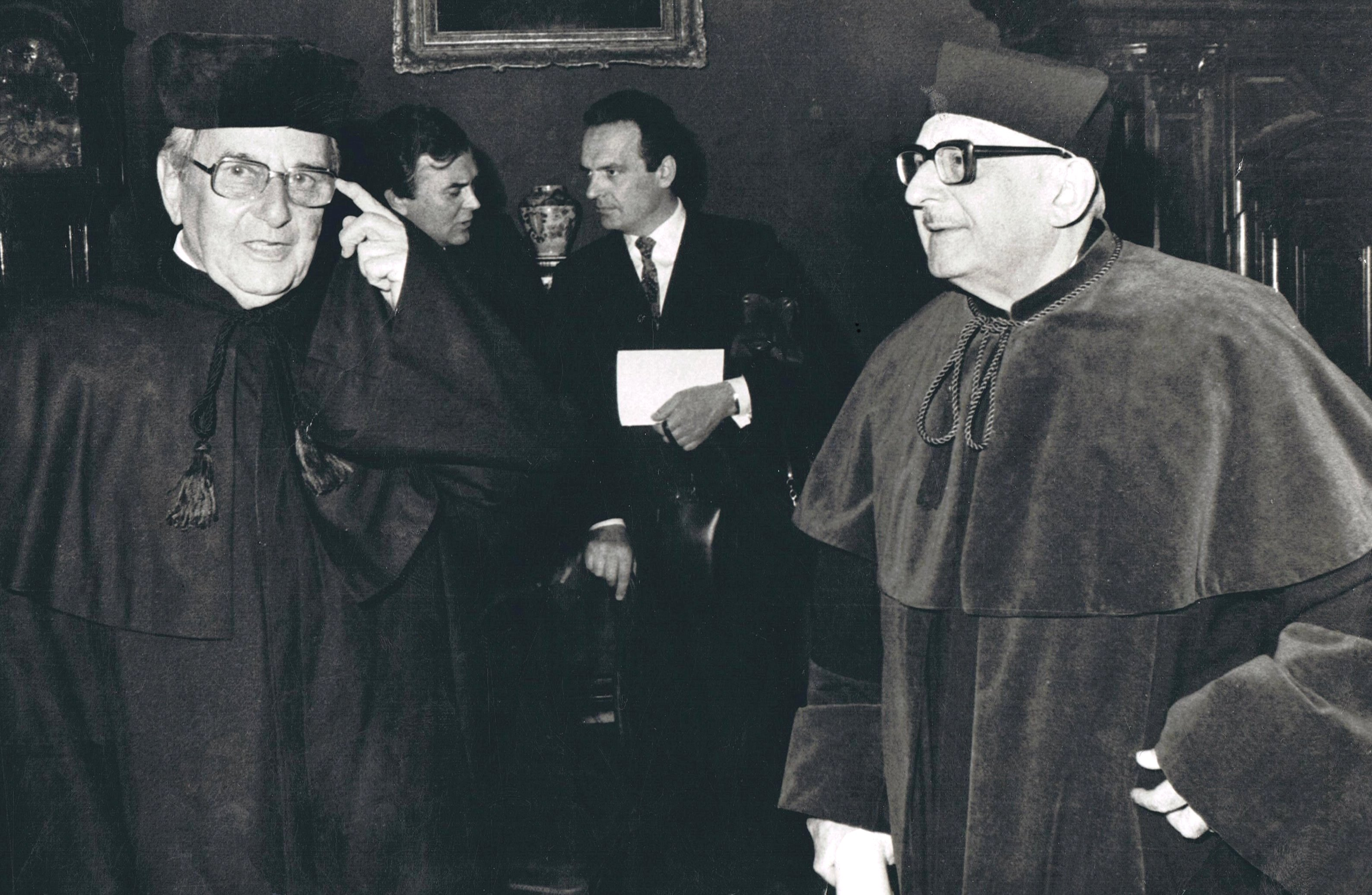
Julian Godlewski and the UJ's professor, Jerzy Szablowski (right), after the ceremony of conferrig an honorary doctorate, 1981

Julian August ″Jul″ Godlewski, (17 August 1903 – 4 February 1983) was a Polish lawyer, patron of the Polish arts, philanthropist, and Polish diaspora activist.

== Biography ==
He was born in a well-known Lviv family of Włodzimierz Godlewski – a president of the Bar Association in Lviv, and Anna Helena Georgina née Zahariewicz (1873–1966). His maternal grandfather, Julian Zachariewicz, was an architect, professor and rector of Lviv Polytechnic University.

In 1920, he took part in the Polish-Bolsheviks War. In 1921, he obtained a certificate from the local Adam Mickiewicz Higher and Real Junior High School and then, continuing the family tradition, he graduated from the Faculty of Law at the Jan Kazimierz University in Lviv. He later obtained a Doctor of Law degree. Before World War II, he was a referendary at the Ministry of Foreign Affairs.

During the war, he was a second lieutenant of the Polish Armed Forces, in the ranks of the 1st Armored Division, commanded by General Stanisław Maczek. In 1944, he was badly wounded in the Battle of Falaise. On 1 January 1946, he was promoted to the rank of lieutenant in the cavalry officer corps.

After the war, he remained abroad. During his stay in the United States, he was for a short period the adjutant and translator of General Tadeusz Bór-Komorowski. Then, he stayed in Argentina, where he obtained citizenship, and returned to Europe soon after. For a long time, he held a high position on the management board of the Thyssen steel company, being a family friend as well. He resided in Lugano, Switzerland, renting an apartment in the ″Splendide Royal″ hotel for almost thirty years He was a member of the Lviv Citizens' Circle in London, England.

From 1962, he regularly came to Poland with annual, several-week visits. Shortly before his death, he returned to Poland and settled in Warsaw. He was buried there at the Powązki Military Cemetery.

== Philanthropy ==
From the 1950s, he supported the Polish Museum in Rapperswil, Switzerland, for several decades, becoming its main sponsor over the years. The Museum's collection of paintings was created largely due to the donated major works of art from his own collection.

He was also a great benefactor of the Wawel Royal Castle in Kraków. Between 1962 and 1977, he purchased several precious items such as the historical portraits of Poland's kings, the Casimir III the Great chalice and the XVIth century tapestry. In recognition of his services to Wawel, a commemorative plaque with his name was placed on one of the castle walls.Furthermore, the Senate of the Jagiellonian University awarded him an honorary doctorate in May 1981.

For many years, he donated the Society for the Care of the Blind in Laski, the Faculty of Philosophy at the Salesian Theological Seminary, functioning at that time in Czerwińsk, and the Polish Alpinism Association. He contributed to the success of several Polish famous Himalayan expeditions in the 1970s and 1980s, incl. the first winter ascent of Mount Everest in 1979/1980. He also provided financial support to building up the Children's Memorial Health Institute in Warsaw and gave many grants to private persons.

To honor his mother's 90th birth anniversary, he founded the Anna Godlewska Literary Award. The laureates were Polish artists working in Poland or on the west side of the Iron Curtain. It was awarded from 1963 to 1973.

== Decorations and awards ==
- Commander of the Order of Merit of the Polish People's Republic
- Cross of Valour
- Gold Cross of Merit with Swords
- Gold Cross of Merit
- Croix de Guerre (France)
- Honorary doctorate from the Jagiellonian University, 1981

== Bibliography ==
- ″2023 marks the 120th anniversary of Julian Godlewski’s birth and the 40th anniversary of his death″, The Polish Museum in Rapperwil
