= Jan Kapela =

Polish politician

Vice-mayor of Warsaw
- In office 1975–1978

Vice-voivode of Warsaw
- In office 1975–1978

Personal details
- Born: 25 April 1931 Bogumiłowice, Poland
- Died: 3 May 1987 (aged 56)
- Party: Polish Workers' Party; Polish United Workers' Party

Jan Kapela (25 April 1931 – 3 May 1987) was a Polish politician. He was the first secretary of the Polish United Workers' Party County Committee in Płońsk, and in the years 1975–1978 was vice-mayor of Warsaw and ex officio vice-voivode of Warsaw.

== Political activity ==
In 1948 he joined the Polish Workers' Party (PPR), then he joined the Polish United Workers' Party (PZPR). In 1951 he completed a course for first secretaries at the PZPR County Committee in Pułtusk. In 1973–1975 he was the first secretary of the PZPR County Committee in Płońsk, and then from 1975 to 1978 he was a member of the executive committee of the Warsaw Committee of the Polish United Workers' Party. From 1975 to 1978 he held the position of the vice-mayor of Warsaw and, ex officio, the vice-voivode of Warsaw. Then, from 1978 to 1979, he was a member of the Warsaw Committee of the Polish United Workers' Party.

== Death ==
He was buried at the Powązki Military Cemetery (B15 / 4/3).

== Honours and awards ==
In 1955 he was awarded the Silver Cross of Merit.
