= Henryk Wujec =

Polish politician (1940–2020)

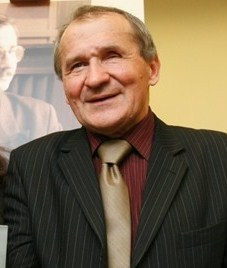
Wujec in 2007

Henryk Wujec (25 December 1940 – 15 August 2020) was a Polish politician who served as a member of the Sejm.

Wujec was born in Podlesie, Biłgoraj County. As a child, he was interned at Majdanek concentration camp. He graduated from Warsaw University with a degree in Physics and went on to study electron technology as a postgraduate in 1970. Wujec also married his wife, physics teacher and dissident Ludwika Wujec (nee Okrent) in 1970 as well.

A physicist by profession, Wujec was an activist in the Solidarity movement of the 1980s. In 1984, he was imprisoned at Białołęka for his political activities.

Wujec was Secretary of State in the Ministry of Agriculture and Rural Development in the government of Jerzy Buzek in 1999-2000. He acted as an advisor to Bronisław Komorowski when the latter became President of Poland in 2010.

He died at the age of 79 on 15 August 2020 after a long illness. He was buried at the Powązki Military Cemetery and posthumously awarded Poland's highest order, the Order of the White Eagle.
