= Powązki Military Cemetery =

Military cemetery in Warsaw, Poland

Coordinates: 52°15′30″N 20°57′11″E

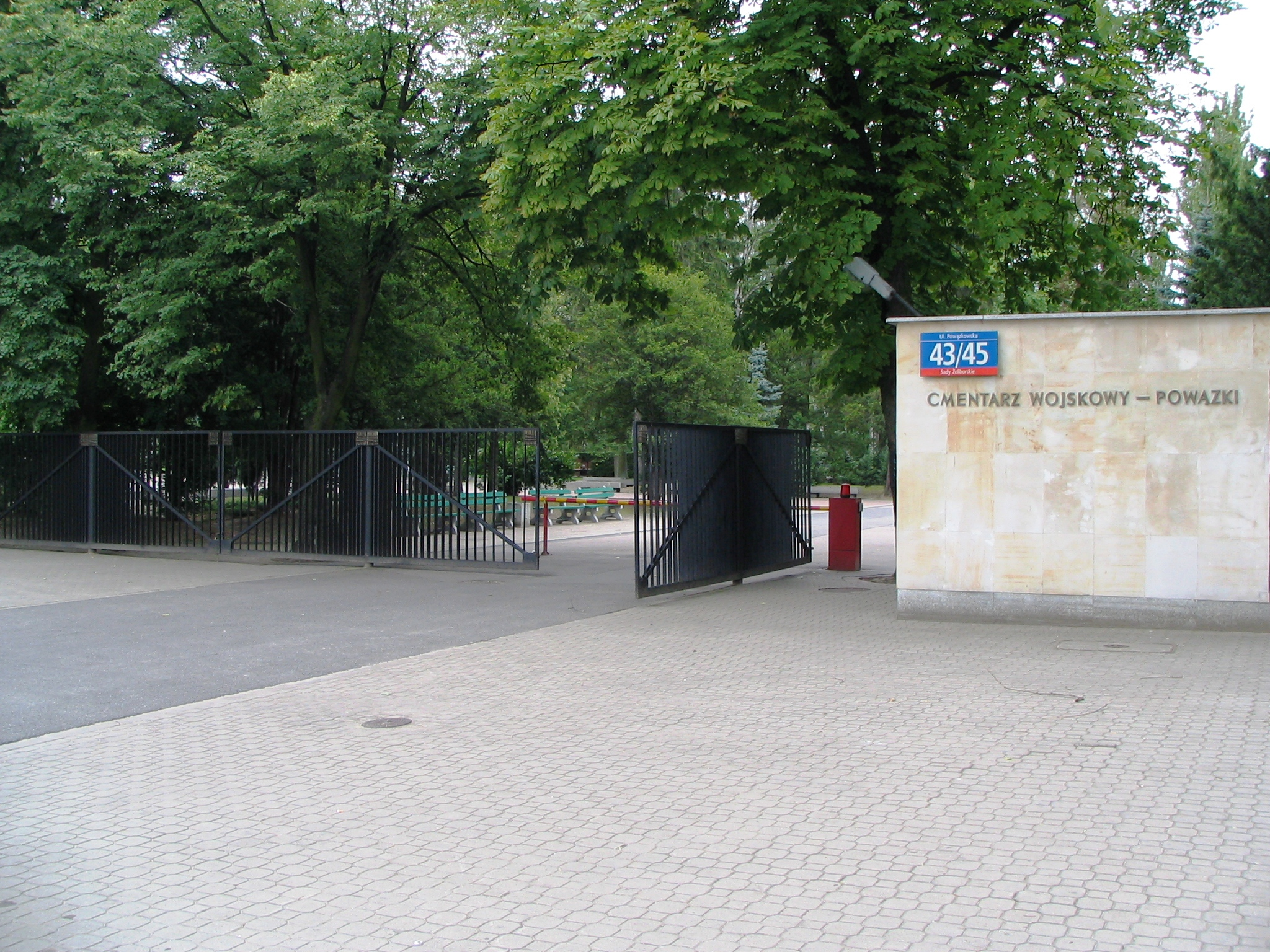
- Entrance to the Powązki Military Cemetery

Details
- Established: 1912
- Location: Warsaw
- Country: Poland
- Type: Public
- Size: 24 ha
- Website: Official website

Powązki Military Cemetery (Polish pronunciation: [pɔˈvɔ̃skʲi]; Polish: Cmentarz Wojskowy na Powązkach) is an old military cemetery located in the Żoliborz district, western part of Warsaw, Poland. The cemetery is often confused with the older Powązki Cemetery, known colloquially as "Old Powązki". The Old Powązki cemetery is located to the south-east of the military cemetery.

The military cemetery holds the graves of many who have fought and died for their country since the early 19th century, including a large number involved in the 1920 Battle of Warsaw, the September 1939 Campaign, and the 1944 Warsaw Uprising against Nazi Germany.

== History ==
It was founded in 1912 as an annex to the Catholic cemetery, but after Poland regained independence in 1918, it became the state cemetery, where some of the most notable people of the period were buried, regardless of their faith.

A large part of the cemetery is occupied by graves of Polish soldiers who died in the Warsaw Uprising. Most of the graves were exhumed between 1945 and 1953 from the streets of Warsaw. In many cases, the names of the soldiers remain unknown, and the graves are marked only by the Polish Red Cross identification number. Until the early 1950s, brothers-in-arms of many dead soldiers organised exhumations of their colleagues on their own, and there are many quarters where soldiers of specific units are buried. Also in the cemetery are several mass graves of (mostly unknown) civilian victims of the German terror during World War II, especially during the Warsaw Uprising. There are mass graves of political prisoners executed during the Stalinist period, which lie under the graves of Communist figures. It took a change in the law to enable researchers to begin the recovery of these remains. As of August 2015, that work was ongoing.

In 1964, communist authorities renamed the cemetery to "Communal Cemetery". The traditional name was restored in 1998.

== Notable burials ==
Those buried at the cemetery include:

- Magdalena Abakanowicz (1930–2017), sculptor
- Henryk Arctowski (1871–1958), geologist and explorer
- Grażyna Bacewicz (1909–1969), composer
- Krzysztof Kamil Baczyński (1921–1944), Home Army soldier and poet
- Władysław Bartoszewski (1922–2015), politician, social activist, journalist, writer and historian
- Józef Beck (1894–1944), politician
- Zygmunt Berling (1896–1980), general and politician
- Bolesław Bierut (1892–1956), Polish President, Prime Minister and communist leader
- Jan Brzechwa (1898–1966), poet
- Jan Bytnar (1921–1943), Home Army soldier and anti-Nazi resistance fighter
- Grzegorz Ciechowski (1957–2001), musician
- Józef Cyrankiewicz (1911–1989), communist leader
- Kazimierz Deyna (1947–1989), footballer
- Xawery Dunikowski (1875–1964), sculptor and painter
- Adolf Dymsza (1900–1975), actor
- Wojciech Fangor (1922–2015), painter and graphic artist
- Emil August Fieldorf (1895–1953), general and WWII hero
- Konstanty Ildefons Gałczyński (1905–1953), poet
- Bronisław Geremek (1932–2008), politician and social historian
- Julian Godlewski (1903-1983), businessman and philanthropist
- Władysław Gomułka (1905–1982), communist leader
- Kazimierz Górski (1921–2006), football coach
- Mirosław Hermaszewski (1941–2022), first Polish cosmonaut
- Leopold Infeld (1898–1968), physicist
- Stefania Jabłońska (1920–2017), scientist
- Alina Janowska (1923–2017), actress
- Wojciech Jaruzelski (1923–2014), communist leader
- Jan Kapela (1931–1987), politician
- Ryszard Kapuściński (1932–2007), journalist
- Joanna Kołaczkowska (1966–2025), cabaret performer
- Leszek Kołakowski (1927–2009), philosopher
- Władysław Komar (1940–1998), athlete
- Tadeusz Konwicki (1926–2015), writer
- Kazimierz Kuratowski (1896–1980), mathematician
- Jacek Kuroń (1934–2004), anti-communist activist
- Stefan Kuryłowicz (1949–2011), architect
- Oskar Lange (1904–1965), economist
- Tadeusz Łomnicki (1927–1992), actor
- Julian Marchlewski (1866-1925), politician and revolutionary activist
- Stanisław Mazur (1905–1981), mathematician
- Grzegorz Miecugow (1955–2017), media personality
- Michalina Mościcka (1871–1932), fourth First Lady of Poland (1926–1932)
- Zofia Nałkowska (1884–1954), novelist
- Jan Olszewski (1930–2019), politician
- Maria Ossowska (1896–1974), sociologist
- Danuta Przeworska-Rolewicz (1931–2012), mathematician and resistance fighter
- Marian Rejewski (1905–1980), mathematician and cryptologist
- Zbigniew Religa (1938–2009), surgeon and politician
- Michał Rola-Żymierski (1890–1989), communist leader and marshal of Poland
- Tadeusz Ross (1938–2021), actor and politician
- Leon Schiller (1887–1954), theatre director
- Kamila Skolimowska (1982–2009), athlete
- Walery Sławek (1879–1939), politician
- Piotr Sobociński (1958–2001), cinematographer
- Stanisław Sosabowski (1892–1967), WWII general
- Tomasz Stańko (1942–2018), jazz musician
- Henryk Stażewski (1894–1988), painter
- Aleksander Sulkiewicz (1867–1916), politician
- Jerzy Szacki (1929–2016), sociologist
- Danuta Szaflarska (1915–2017), actress
- Irena Szewińska (1946–2018), athlete
- Władysław Szpilman (1911–2000), pianist and composer
- Leonid Teliga (1917–1970), sailor
- Izabela Tomaszewska (1955–2010), archeologist, government protocol director
- Julian Tuwim (1894–1953), poet
- Jerzy Urban (1933–2022), journalist, publicist, columnist, writer, spokesman for the Polish People's Republic's government
- Witold Woyda (1939–2008), fencer
- Ludwika Wujec (1941–2024), dissident
- Jan Zumbach (1915–1986), WWII fighter pilot and flying ace

== Gallery ==
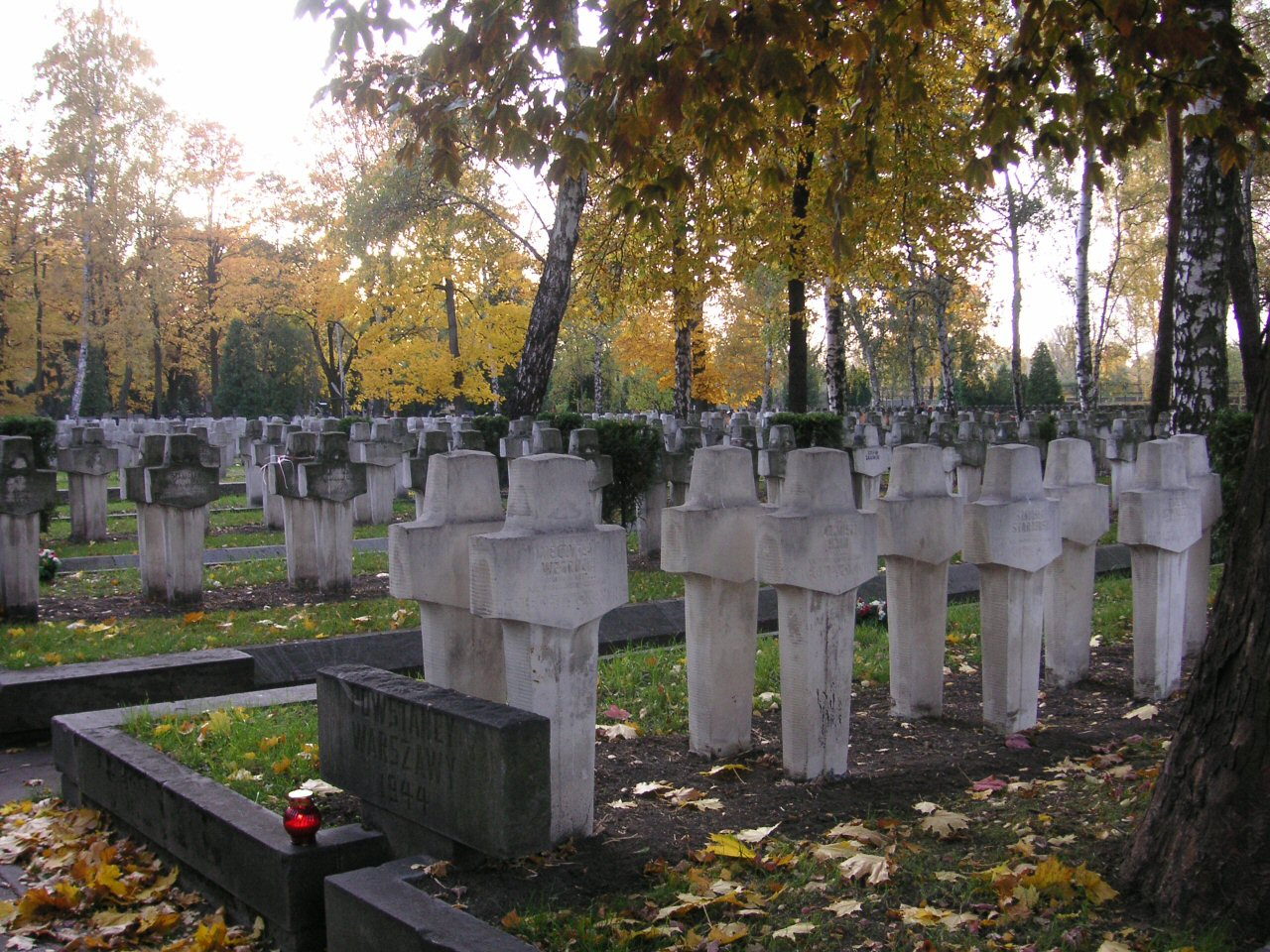
Graves of Polish soldiers who died in the 1944 Warsaw Uprising

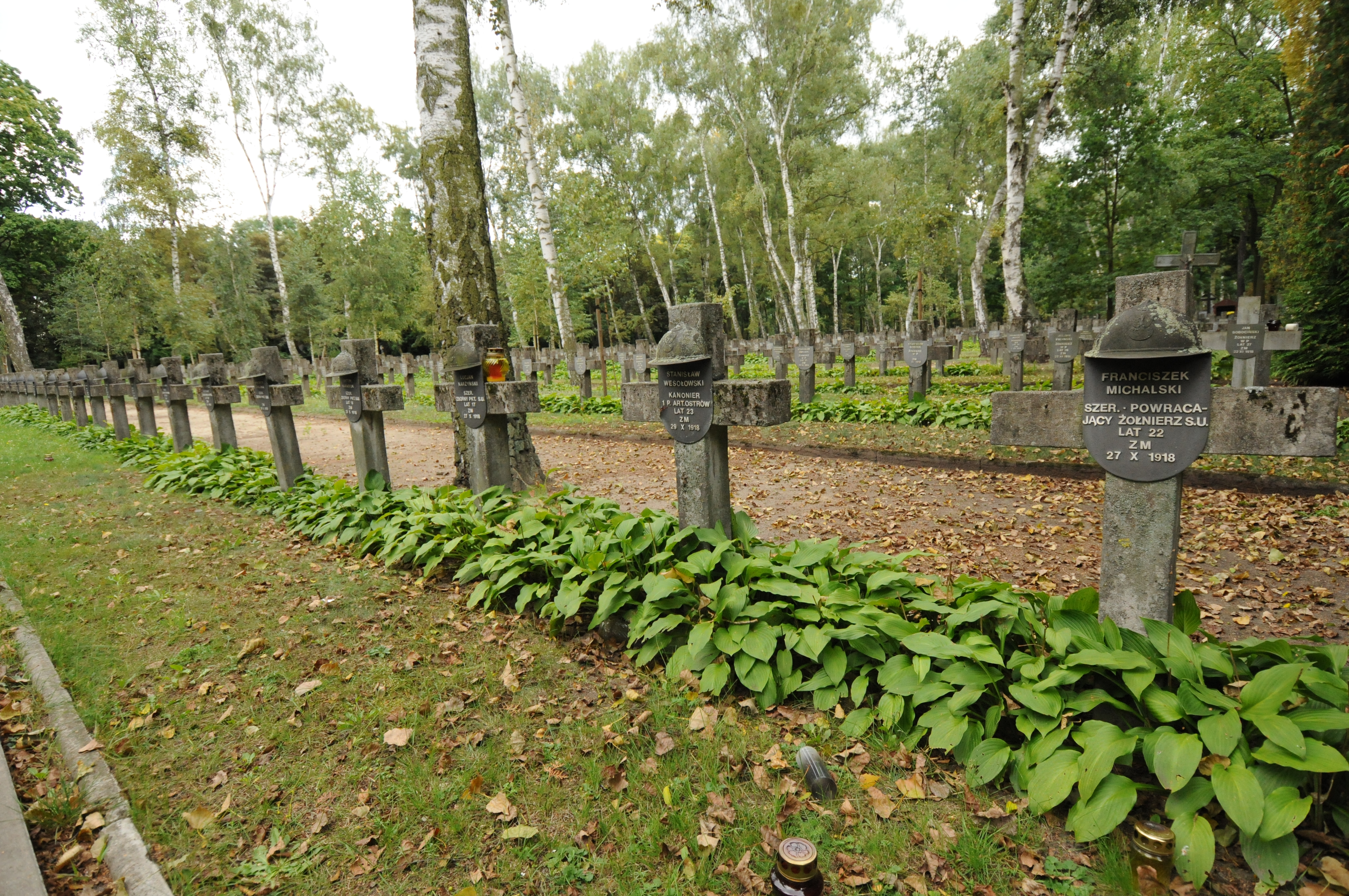
Graves from the Polish-Soviet War

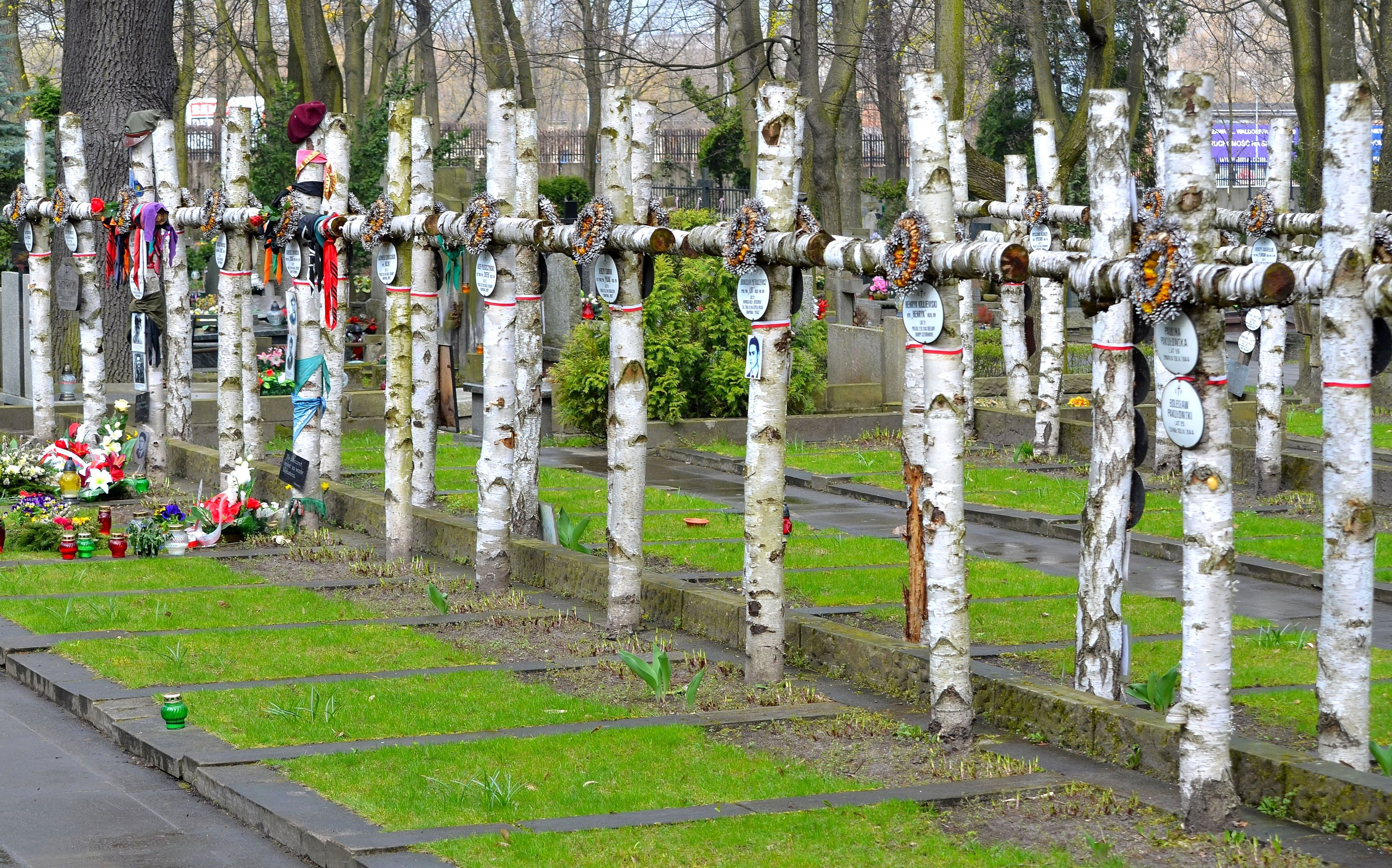
Graves of Gray Ranks members

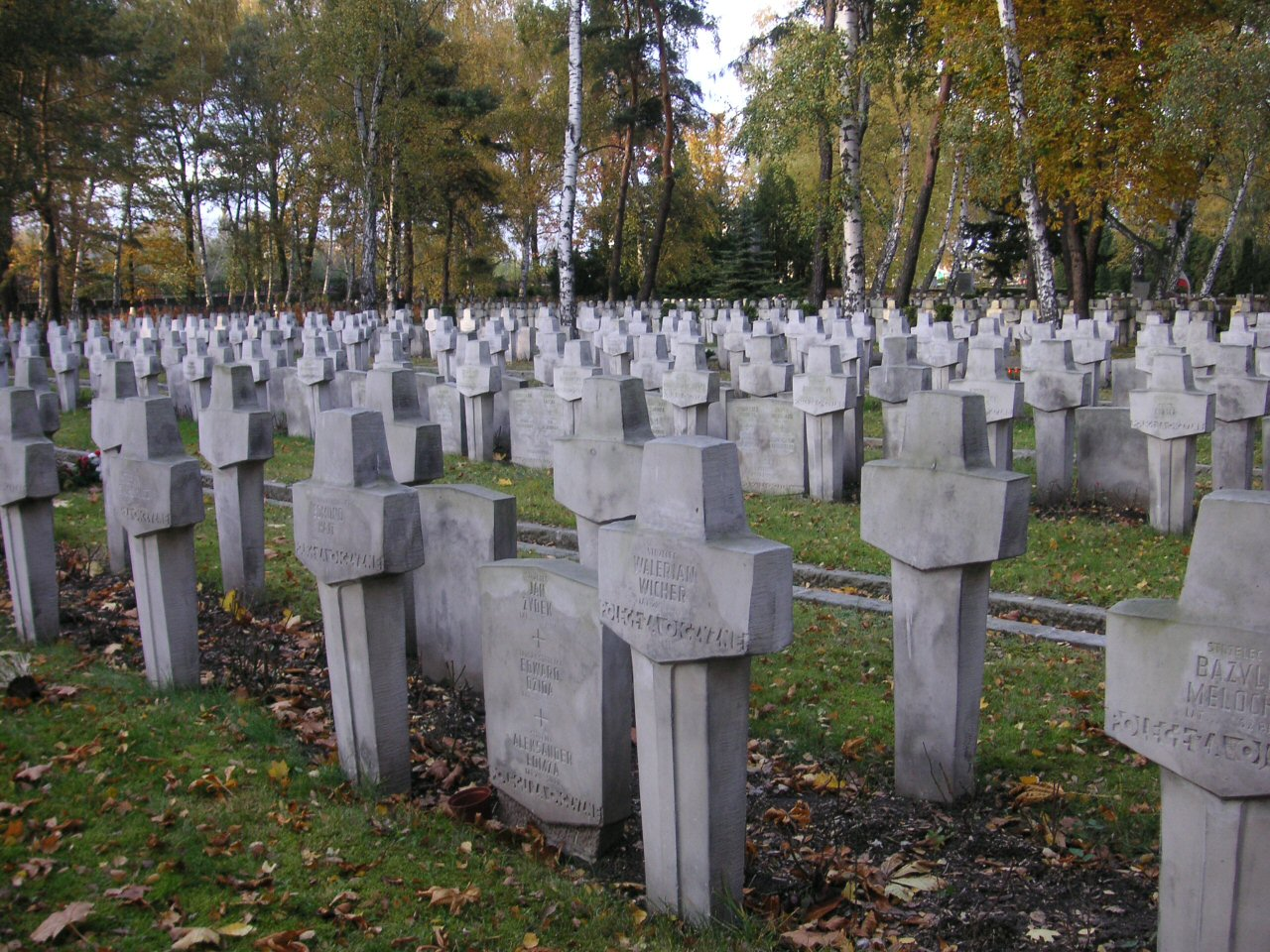
World War II graves

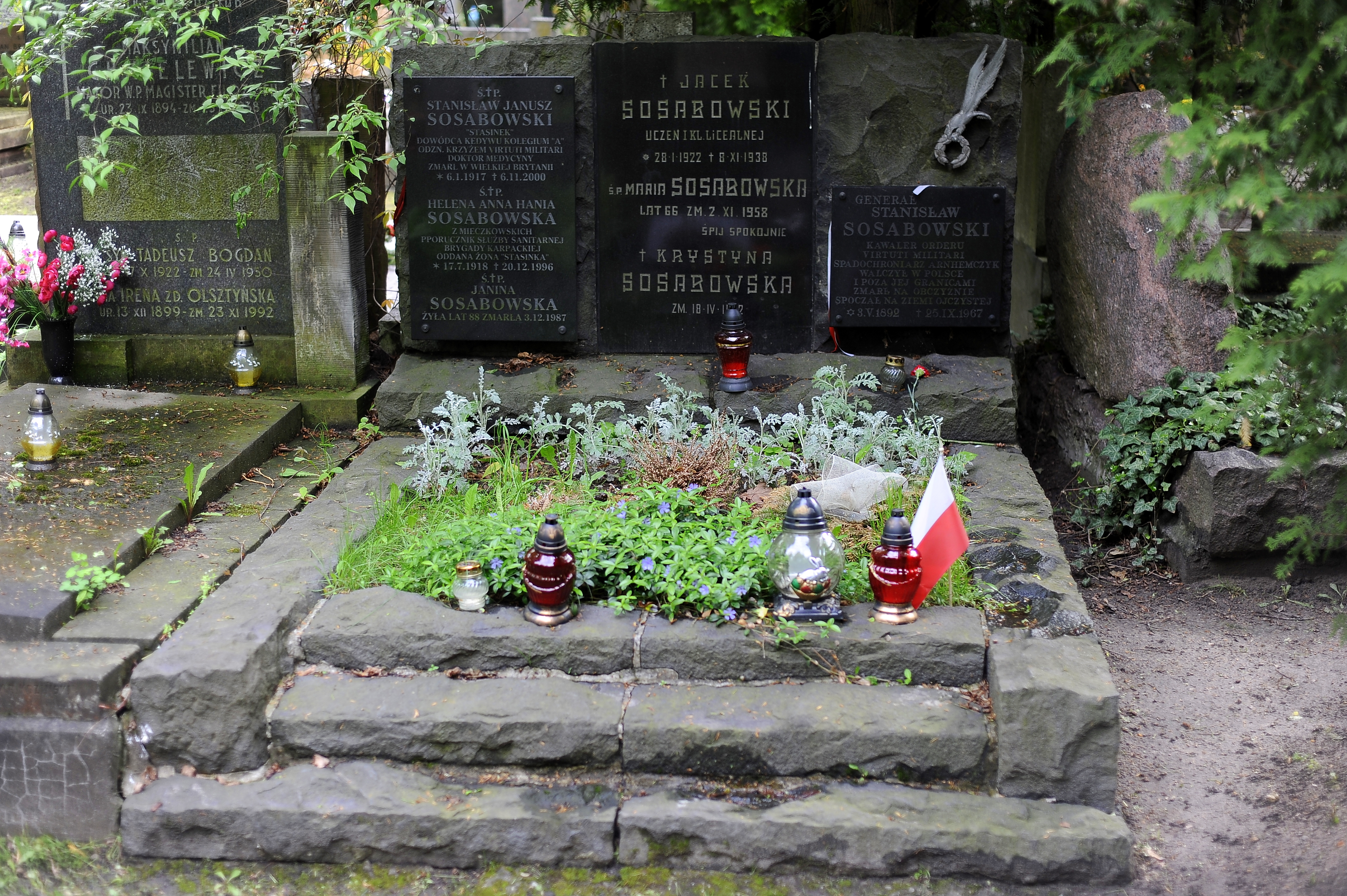
Stanisław Sosabowski's grave

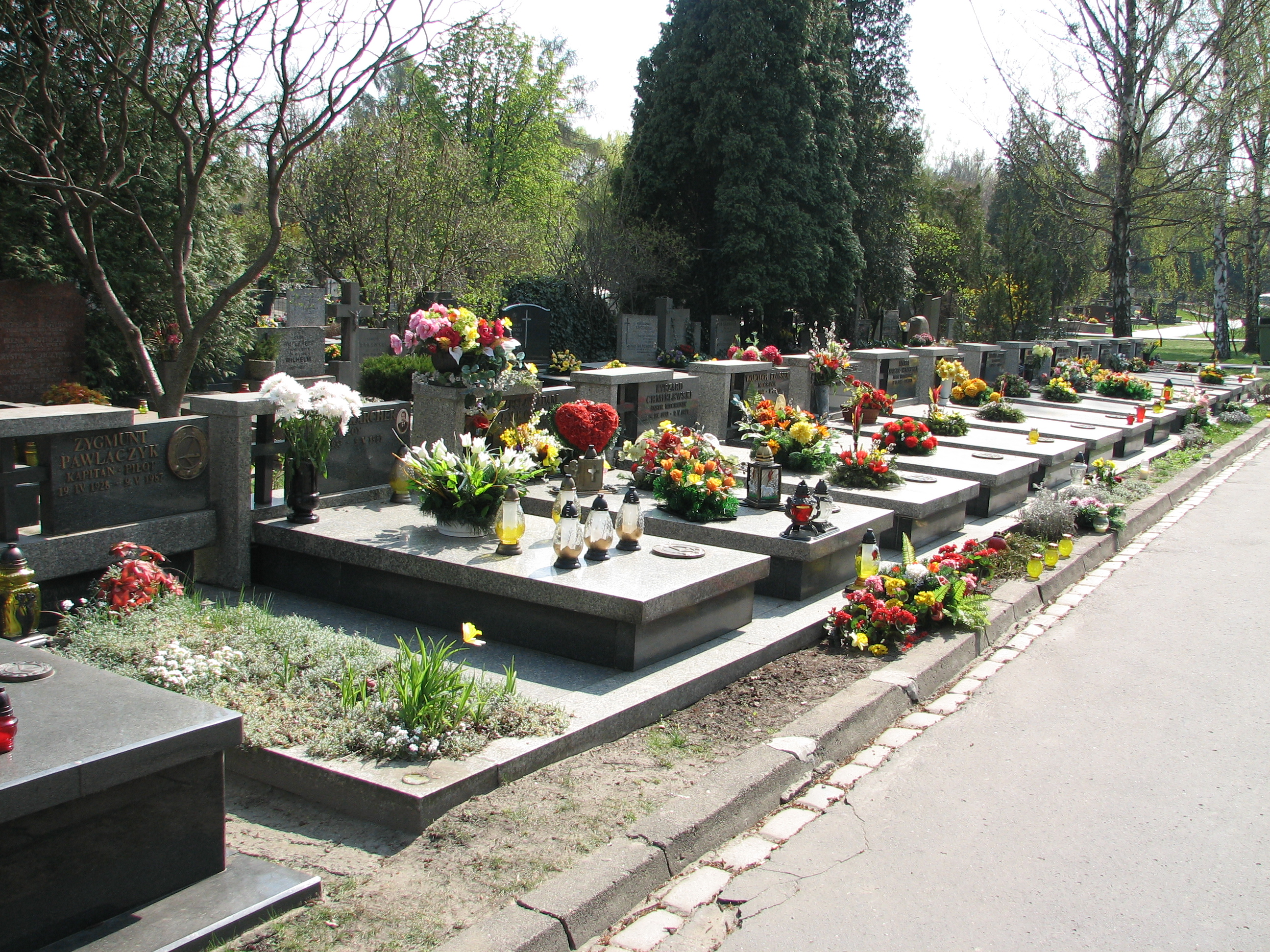
Graves of the victims of the LOT Polish Airlines Flight 5055

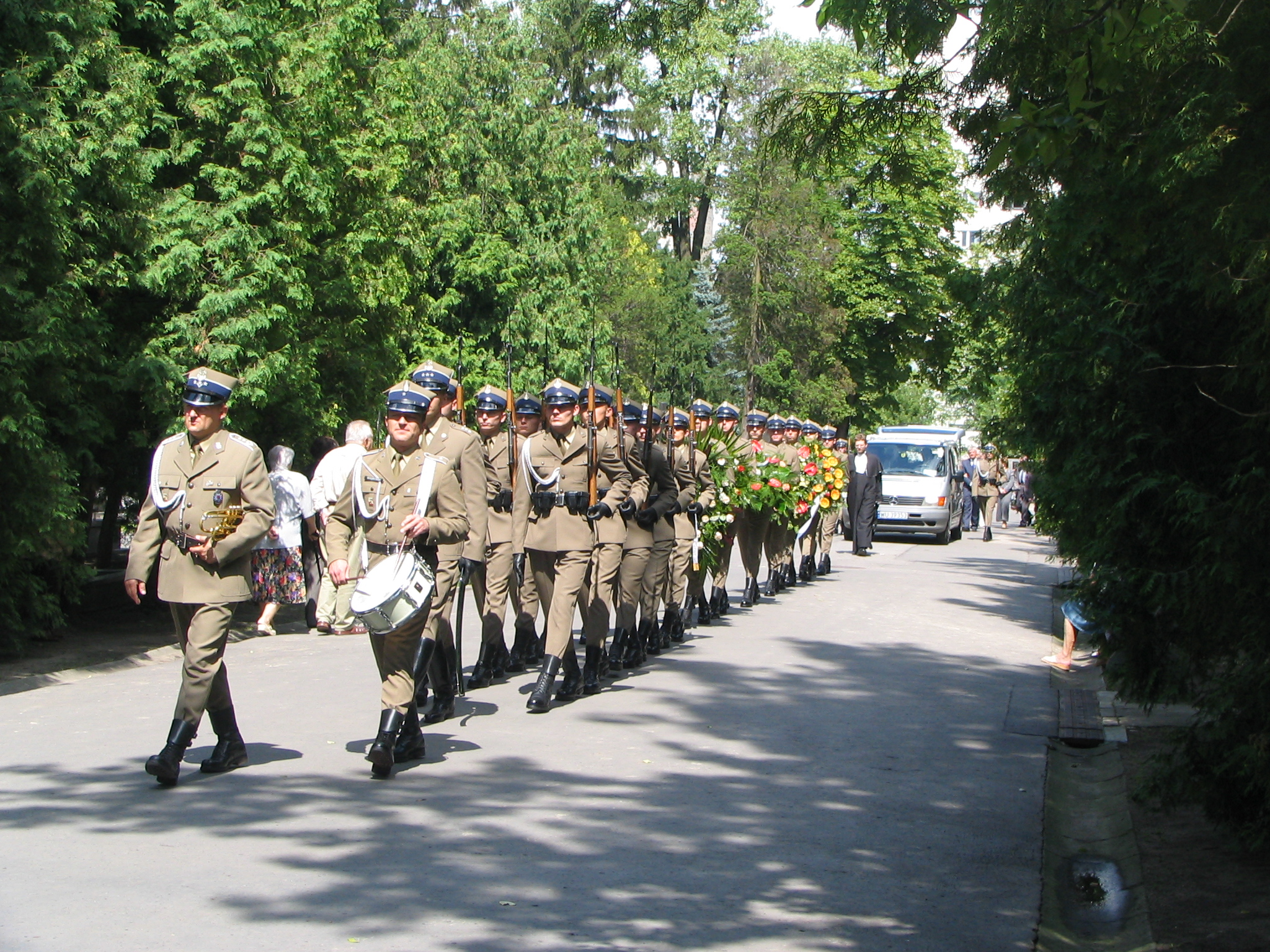
Funeral ceremony at the cemetery

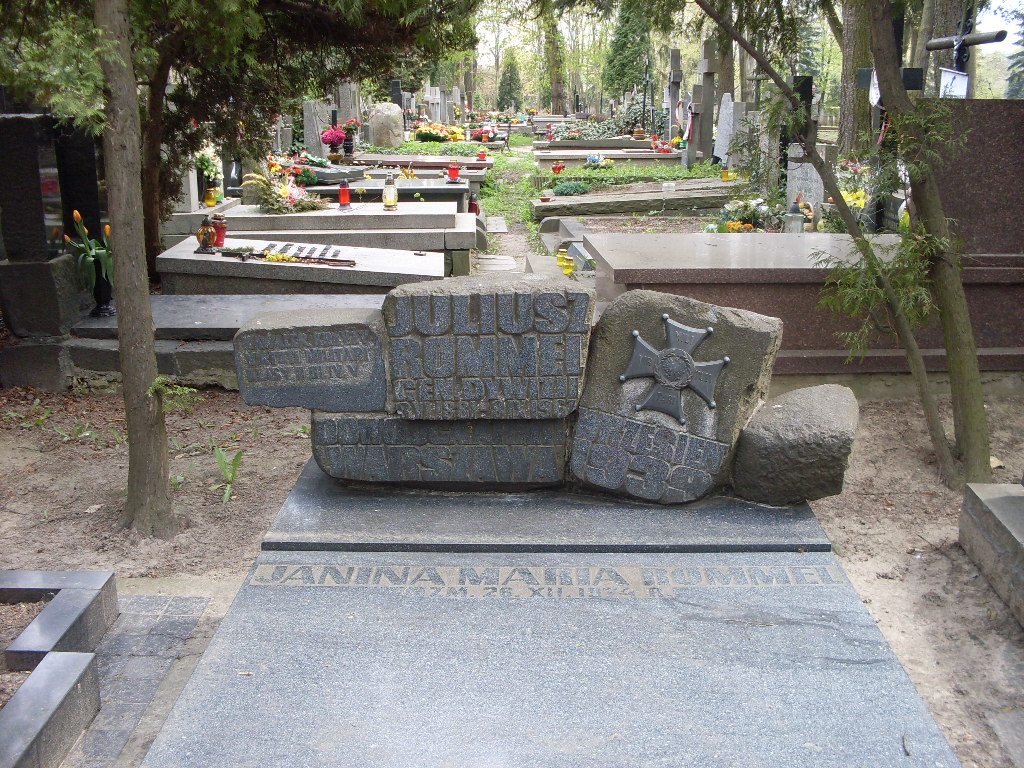
Juliusz Rómmel's grave

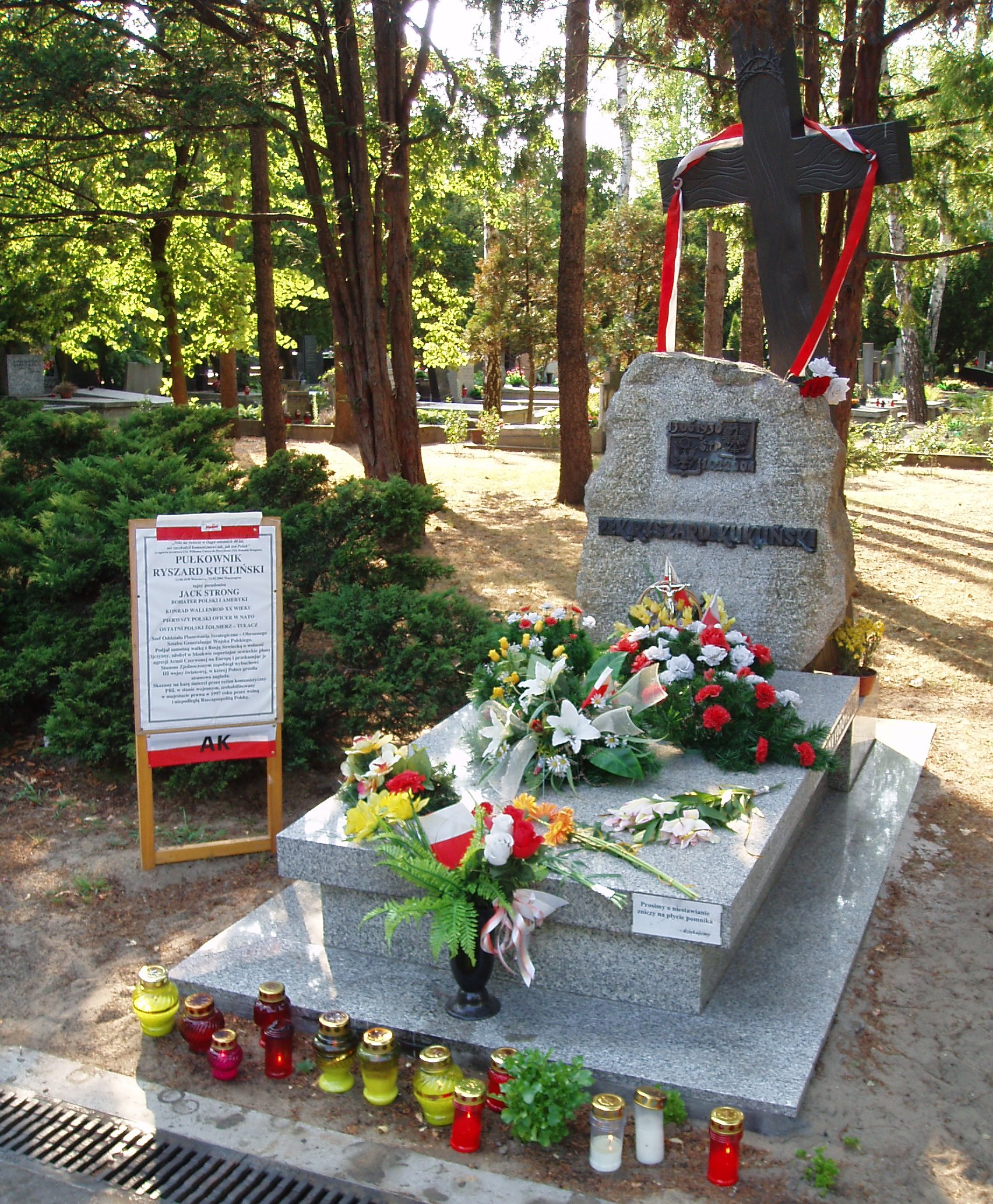
Ryszard Kukliński's grave

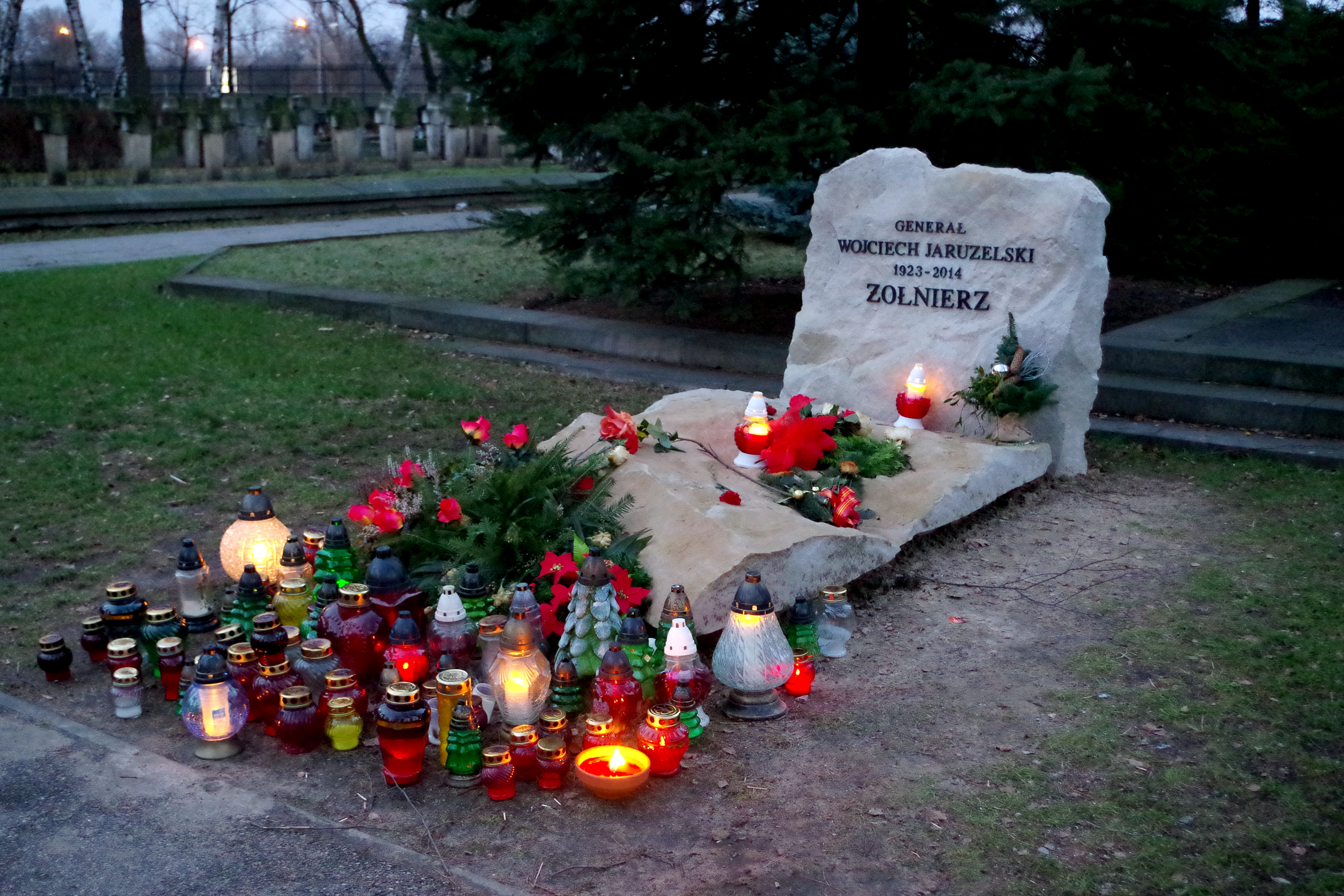
Wojciech Jaruzelski's grave

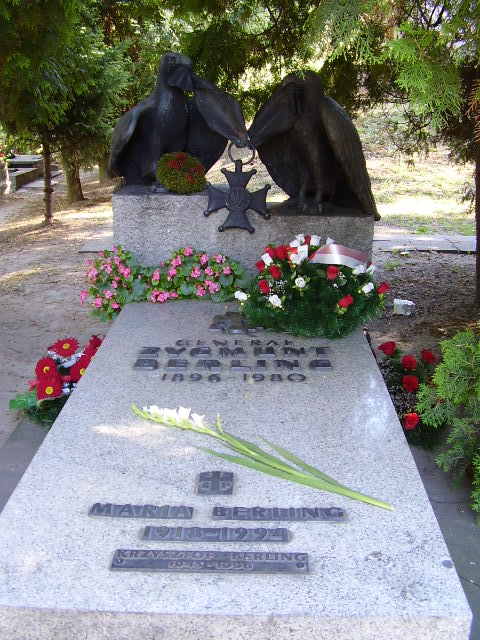
Zygmunt Berling's grave

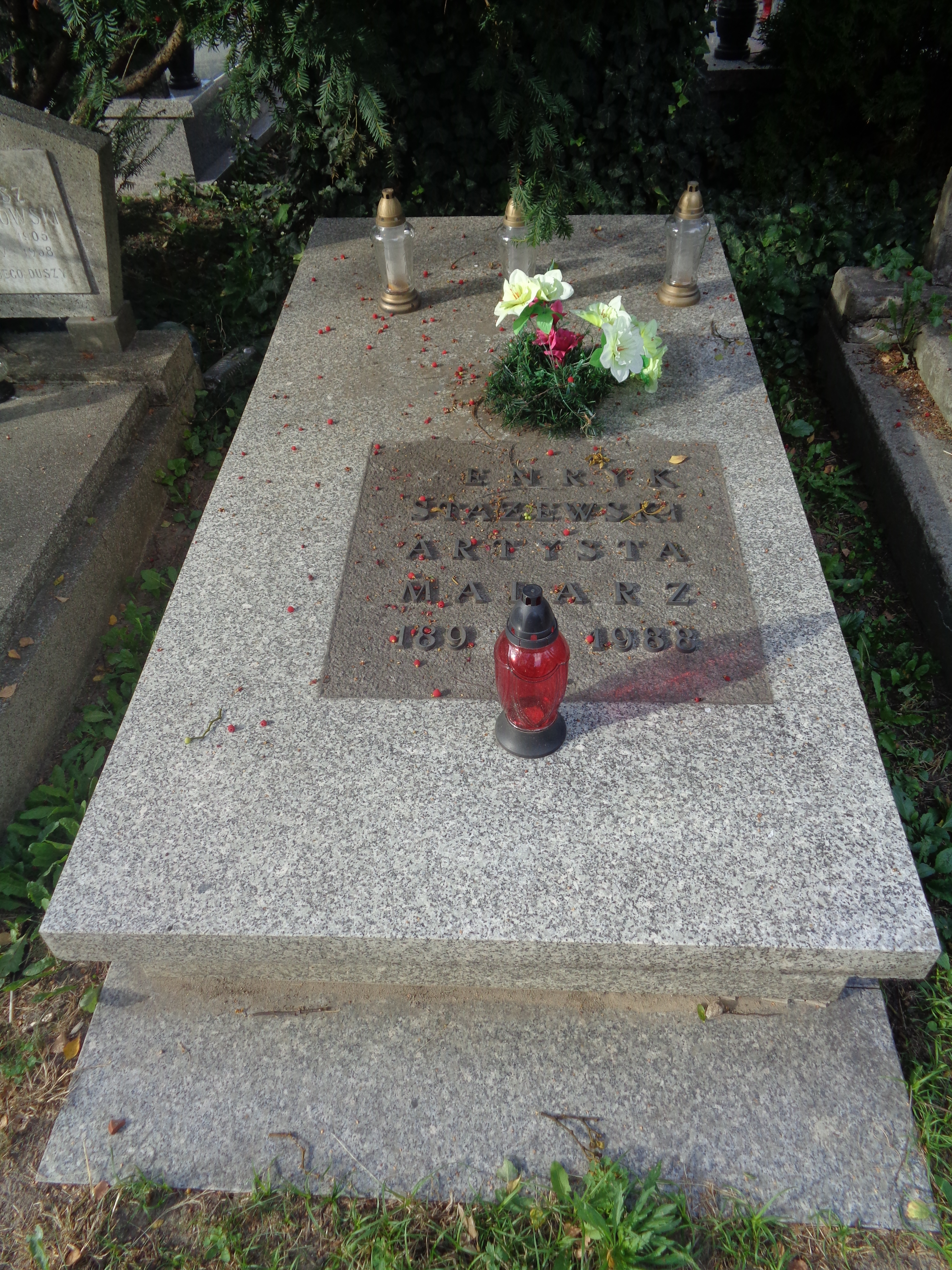
Henryk Stażewski's grave

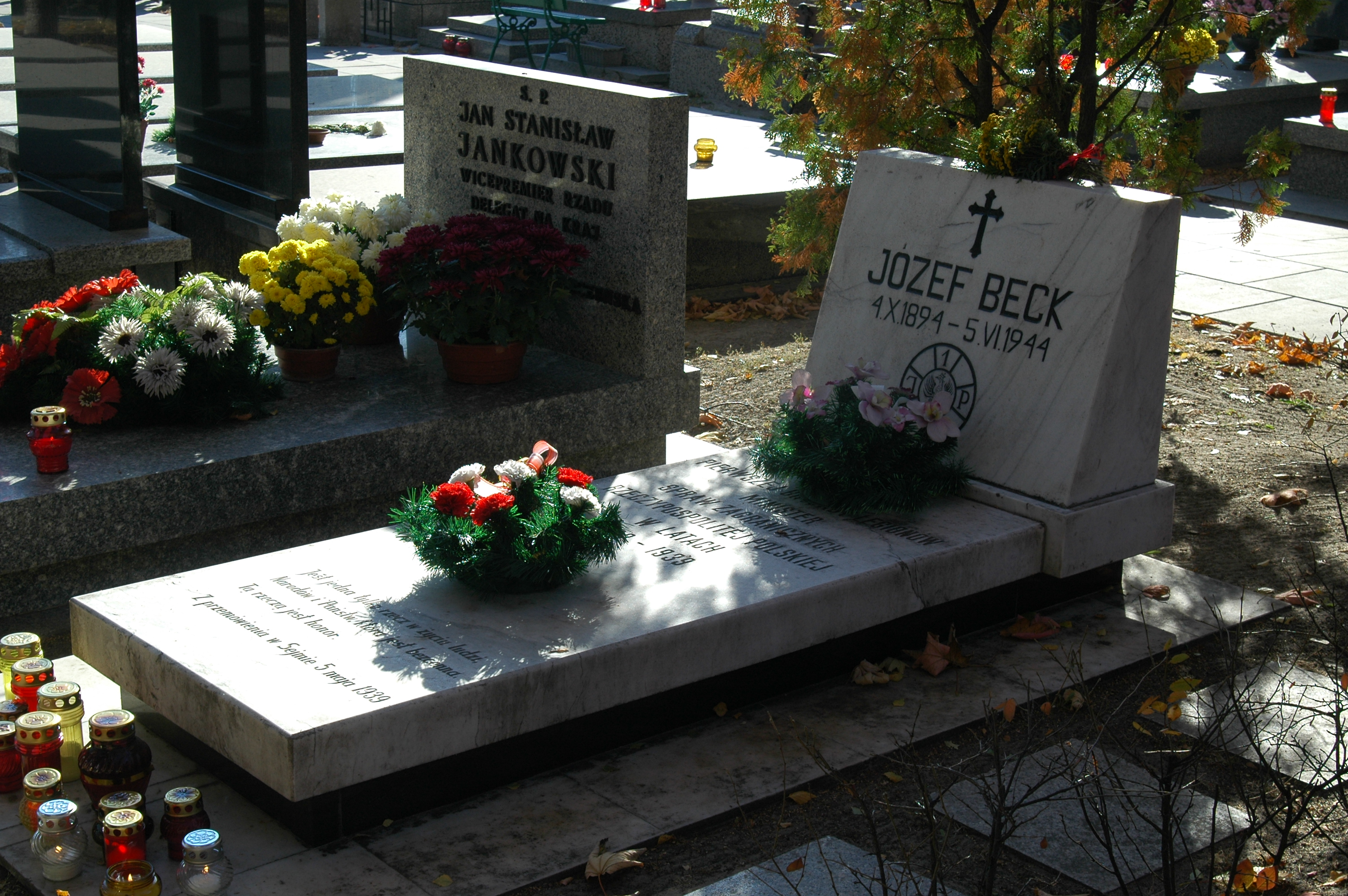
Józef Beck's and Jan Jankowski's graves

== See also ==
- Powązki Cemetery
- Rakowicki Cemetery
- Lychakiv Cemetery
