= Ludwika Wujec =

Polish political activist (1941–2024)

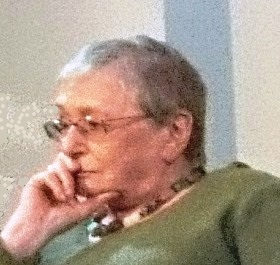
Wujec in 2024

Ludwika Wujec (2 April 1941 – 26 May 2024) was a Polish physicist, teacher, politician, and political activist. Wujec was a member of the pro-democracy dissident movement against the Polish People's Republic during the country's communist era.

== Biography ==
Wujec was born on 2 April 1941, to Jewish parents Oskar and Regina (Burgierman) Okrent, in Soviet-annexed Lviv, in present-day Ukraine. Her parents were tailors. Nazi Germany seized Lviv during Operation Barbarossa in June 1941, just months after her birth. Wujec spent the first years of her life living in the Soviet Union with her mother as a refugee near Stalingrad and the Ural Mountains region. Her father, Oskara, fought in the Second Polish Army, a Polish People's Army unit formed in the Soviet Union, and was killed at the Battle of Dresden in 1945.

Wujec returned to Poland with her mother in 1946 after World War II. She graduated from Juliusza Słowackiego High School in Warsaw received her degree from the Faculty of Mathematics, Physics and Chemistry at the University of Łódź. She initially joined the ruling communist Polish United Workers' Party and became a math and physics teacher during the 1950s and 1960s. In 1970, she married Henryk Wujec, a Polish physicist, politician and social activist. The couple remained together until his death in 2020.

In 1980, Henryk Wujec joined the Solidarity trade union. One year later, Ludwika Wujec joined Solidarity's press and media agency. Wujec was arrested and imprisoned for her affiliation with Solidarity during the period of Martial law in Poland, which lasted from 1981 to 1983.

Wujec became an assistant to Tadeusz Mazowiecki, a prominent Solidarity leader and first post-communist prime minister, during the late 1980s, including during the Polish Round Table Agreement negotiations in 1989. She then served as the deputy director of Lech Wałęsa's Office of the Citizen Committee.

Following the fall of Communism, Wujec entered Warsaw city government. She served as the secretary and governing board member for the now-defunct Warszawa-Centrum commune from 1995 until 2002. In 1998, Wujec was elected to the Warsaw County, which was disestablished in 2002. She retired from elected politics in 2002.

Wujec died on 26 May 2024, at the age of 83. Her death was announced by her son, Paweł Wujec. She was buried with her late husband, Henryk Wujec, in Powązki Military Cemetery in Warsaw on 29 May 2024.

== Awards and decorations ==
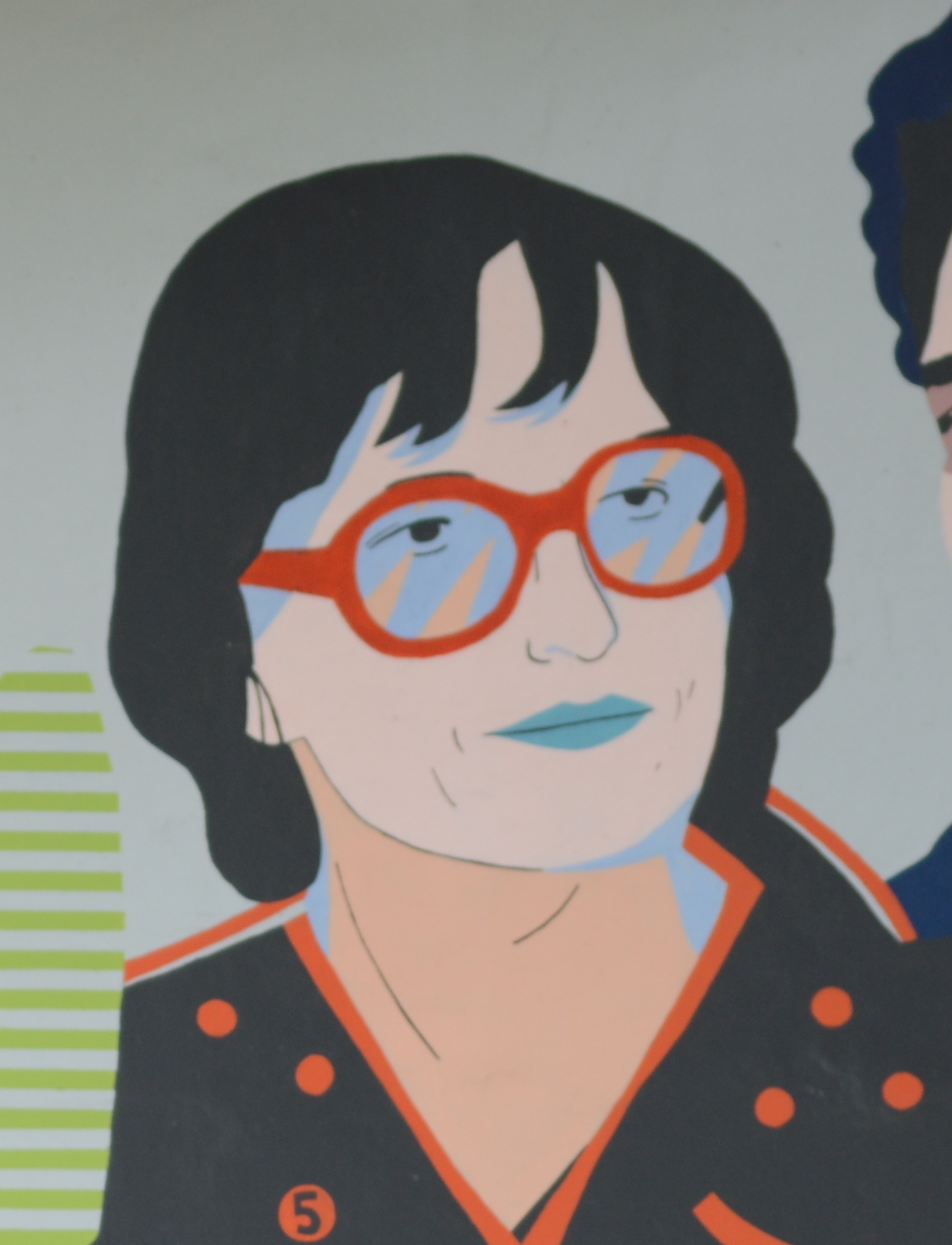
Wujec as depicted in the Kobiety Wolności mural at the Gdańsk Strzyża railway station.

President Lech Kaczyński awarded her the Officer's Cross of the Order of Polonia Restituta in 2006. In 2015, President Bronisław Komorowski further awarded Wujec the Cross of Freedom and Solidarity. Wujec and her husband, Henryk Wujec, were jointly awarded the Professor Zbigniew Hołda Award in 2016.

In 2019, Wujec's image was included on the new "Women of Freedom" (Kobiety Wolności) mural at the Gdańsk Strzyża railway station in Gdańsk, which honors women involved with the anti-Communist dissident movement. Other Polish female activists honored with Wujec in the mural include Anna Walentynowicz and Henryka Krzywonos.
