= Tom Wujec =

Author on business visualization topics

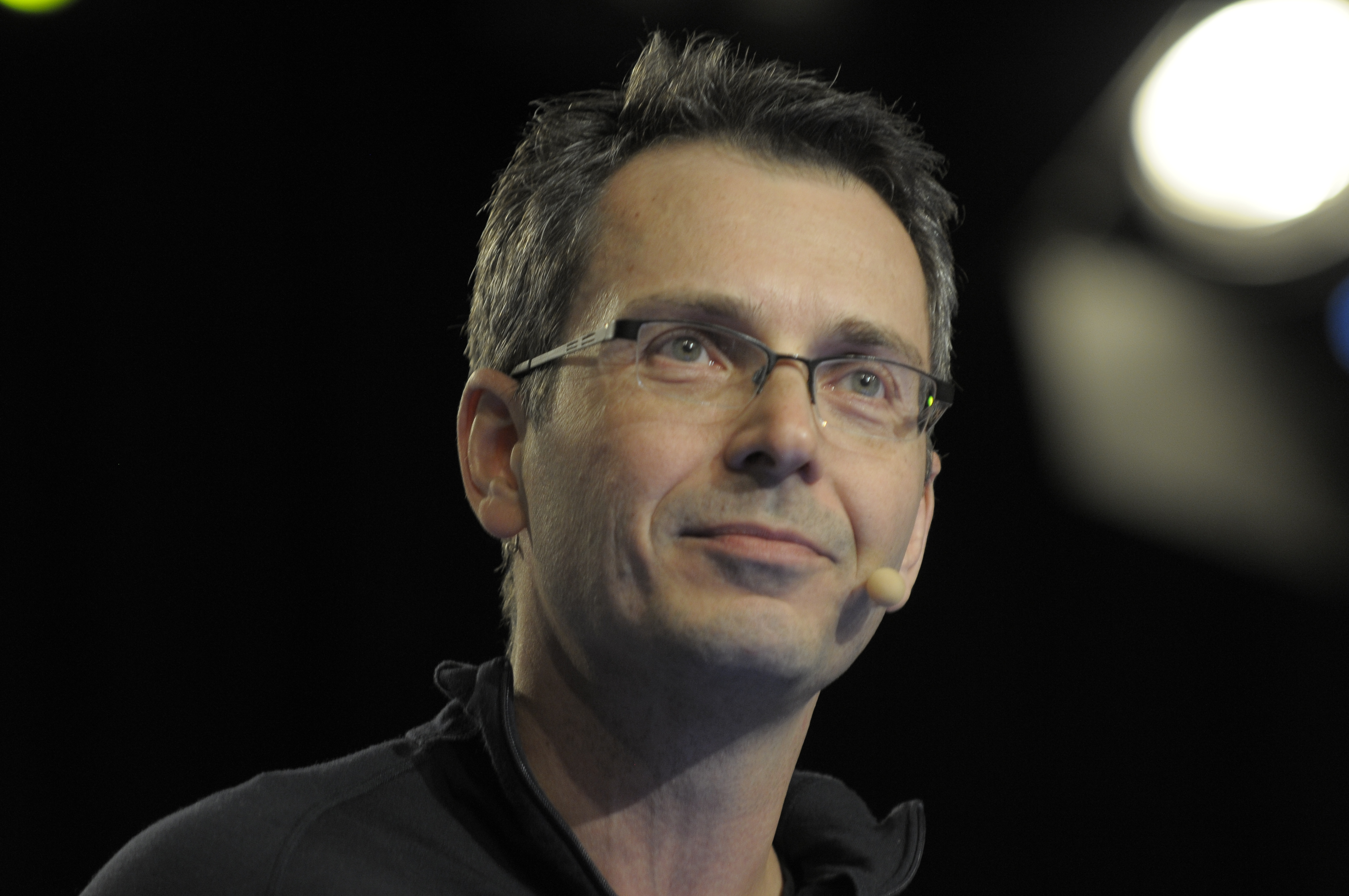
- Wujec in 2010
- Born: July 14, 1959 (age 66); Winnipeg, Manitoba
- Occupation(s): Author, speaker
- Known for: Creativity, innovation, technology, visualization
- Website: tomwujec.com

Tom Wujec (born July 14, 1959) is the author and editor of several books, a fellow at Autodesk, an adjunct professor at Singularity University, a multiple TED Conference speaker and a pioneer in the emerging practice of business visualization.

== Background and career ==
Born in Winnipeg, Manitoba, Canada, Wujec graduated from the University of Toronto with degrees in astronomy and psychology. Starting in 1983, he worked as a writer, lecturer and producer at the McLaughlin Planetarium and in 1989 became a creative director at the Royal Ontario Museum, Canada's largest cultural institution, where he produced a wide variety of large scale interactive exhibits.

After leaving the public sector in 1996, Wujec joined Alias Wavefront, a Canadian computer graphic company to lead a variety of marketing, sales, product management and consulting functions. Wujec helped bring several products to market, including Autodesk Maya and SketchBook Pro.

In 2006, Wujec joined Autodesk as a fellow, where he currently charts long-term strategy, introduces disruptive technologies and facilitates innovation practices internally as well as for leadership teams serving the architecture, engineering, construction, manufacturing and entertainment industries.

Over the past decade, Wujec has delivered over 200 keynote speeches, presentations and workshops to a wide range of organizations on the subjects of innovation, creativity and technology disruption. He has developed a facilitation practice incorporating visualization, rapid prototyping and business mapping and has applied it to the financial, manufacturing, energy and entertainment sectors as well as non-profit organizations.

== Books ==
Wujec is the author, co-author and editor of four books on creativity, design and imagination.

- 1988: Pumping Ions: Games and Exercises to Flex the Mind, Doubleday ISBN 978-0-385-24749-8
- 1995: Five Star Mind: Games and Puzzles to Stimulate the Imagination, Random House ISBN 978-0-385-41462-3
- 2002: Return on Imagination: Realizing the Power of Ideas, co-authored with Sandra Muscat, Financial Times ISBN 978-0-13-062285-3
- 2011: Imagine, Design, Create: How Design, Architects, and Engineers are Transforming our World, Melcher Media ISBN 978-1-59591-066-0

== TED conferences ==
Wujec is a passionate supporter of TED, having participated in over 20 conferences. He has spoken at TED and TEDX events, conducted master classes, produced animations and participated twice as the invited TED artist.

== Singularity University ==
Wujec is a founding professor at Singularity University where he teaches design paradigms, collaboration techniques and exponentially growing design technologies. Frequently, he produces massive wall drawings, sometimes hundreds of feet long, that graphically capture several days of presenters' content, providing visual reference for participants to develop comprehensive business strategies.
