= List of casualties of the Smolensk air disaster =

Casualties of 2010 accident in Russia

First, incomplete published list of passengers (scan of flight manifest in PDF): It has 89 items with #43 for Kruszyńska-Gust whited-over; Pogródka-Węcławek is missing so there are just 8 bodyguards marked with a cross

The Smolensk air disaster included Polish Air Force Flight 101 in 2010 killing all 96 people on board. The Polish delegation was heading to Katyn to attend a ceremony marking the 70th anniversary of the Katyn massacre, in which the Soviet NKVD killed about 22,000 Polish military officers.

Among those killed in the crash of Flight 101 were Polish president Lech Kaczyński, his wife Maria Kaczyńska, former president-in-exile Ryszard Kaczorowski, some of Poland's highest-ranking military officers, lawmakers, heads of the Polish National Bank and other central institutions, presidential aides, bishops and priests of various denominations, relatives of those killed in the Katyn massacre, as well as officers of the presidential security detail and crew members.

Many of the casualties received posthumous recognition and several places were named after them.

== List of fatalities ==
Name	Image	Age	Notes
Joanna Agacka-Indecka		45	President of the Polish Bar Council
Ewa Bąkowska		47	Representative of the Katyn Families
Lt. Gen. Andrzej Błasik		47	Commander of the Air Force
Krystyna Bochenek		56	Deputy Marshal of the Senate (PO)
Anna Maria Borowska		81	Representative of the Katyn Families
Bartosz Borowski		31	Representative of the Katyn Families
Maj. Gen. Tadeusz Buk		49	Commander of the Land Forces
Brig. Gen. Miron Chodakowski		52	Archbishop, Orthodox Ordinary of the Polish Armed Forces
Lt. Col. Czesław Cywiński		84	President of the World Association of Home Army Soldiers
Lt. Col. Zbigniew Dębski		87	Co-founder of the Union of Warsaw Insurgents
Leszek Deptuła		57	Member of the Sejm (PSL)
Grzegorz Dolniak		50	Member of the Sejm (PO)
Katarzyna Doraczyńska		31	Press office staffer at the Chancellery of the President of the Republic of Poland
Edward Duchnowski		80	Secretary General of the Union of Sybiraks
Aleksander Fedorowicz		39	Interpreter at the Chancellery of the President of the Republic of Poland
Janina Fetlińska		57	Senator (PiS)
Lt. Col. Jarosław Florczak		41	Close protection officer
WO1 Artur Francuz		39	Close protection officer
Gen. Franciszek Gągor		58	Chief of the General Staff of the Polish Armed Forces
Grażyna Gęsicka		58	Member of the Sejm, former Minister of Regional Development (PiS)
Brig. Gen. Kazimierz Gilarski		54	Commander of the Warsaw Garrison
Przemysław Gosiewski		45	Member of the Sejm, former Deputy Prime Minister (PiS)
Bronisław Gostomski		61	Personal Roman Catholic chaplain to President Kaczorowski and parish priest of St. Andrew Bobola in Hammersmith, London
Maj. Robert Grzywna		36	Co-pilot
Mariusz Handzlik		44	Undersecretary of State at the Chancellery of the President of the Republic of Poland
Roman Indrzejczyk		78	Personal Roman Catholic chaplain to President Kaczyński
Lt. Paweł Janeczek		37	Close protection officer
Dariusz Jankowski		54	Staffer at the Chancellery of the President of the Republic of Poland
Natalia Januszko		22	Flight attendant
Izabela Jaruga-Nowacka		59	Member of the Sejm, former Deputy Prime Minister (SLD)
Józef Joniec		50	Roman Catholic priest, Piarist father
Ryszard Kaczorowski		90	Former president of the Republic of Poland in exile
Maria Kaczyńska		67	Wife of President Kaczyński
Lech Kaczyński		60	President of the Republic of Poland
Sebastian Karpiniuk		37	Member of the Sejm (PO)
VAdm. Andrzej Karweta		51	Commander of the Navy
Mariusz Kazana		49	Director of Diplomatic Protocol at the Ministry of Foreign Affairs
Janusz Kochanowski		69	Ombudsman for Civil Rights
Brig. Gen. Stanisław Komornicki		85	Chancellor of the Order of Virtuti Militari
Stanisław Komorowski		56	Deputy Minister of National Defence
WO2 Paweł Krajewski		35	Close protection officer
Andrzej Kremer		48	Deputy Minister of Foreign Affairs
Zdzisław Król		74	Roman Catholic priest, member of the Council for the Protection of Struggle and Martyrdom Sites
Janusz Krupski		58	Head of the Office for War Veterans and Victims of Oppression
Janusz Kurtyka		49	President of the Institute of National Remembrance
Andrzej Kwaśnik		53	Roman Catholic police chaplain and chaplain to the Katyn Families
Lt. Gen. Bronisław Kwiatkowski		59	Commander of the Operational Command of the Polish Armed Forces
Col. Wojciech Lubiński		40	Personal physician to President Kaczyński
Tadeusz Lutoborski		83	Representative of the Katyn Families
Barbara Maciejczyk		28	Flight attendant
Barbara Mamińska		52	Director of the Personnel and Decorations Office at the Chancellery of the President of the Republic of Poland
Bożena Mamontowicz-Łojek		72	President of the Polish Katyn Foundation
Stefan Melak		63	Head of the Katyn Committee
Tomasz Merta		44	Deputy Minister of Culture and National Heritage, General Conservator of Monuments
WO2 Andrzej Michalak		36	Flight engineer
Capt. Dariusz Michałowski		35	Close protection officer
Stanisław Mikke		62	Deputy Head of the Council for the Protection of Struggle and Martyrdom Sites
Justyna Moniuszko		24	Flight attendant
Aleksandra Natalli-Świat		51	Member of the Sejm (PiS)
Janina Natusiewicz-Mirer		70	Social activist
2nd Lt. Piotr Nosek		35	Close protection officer
Piotr Nurowski		64	President of the Polish Olympic Committee
Bronisława Orawiec-Löffler		81	Representative of the Katyn Families
Lt. Col. Jan Osiński		35	Roman Catholic priest, Vice-Chancellor of the Curia of the Military Ordinariate
Adam Pilch		44	Lutheran military chaplain
Katarzyna Piskorska		73	Representative of the Katyn Families
Maciej Płażyński		52	Member of the Sejm, former Marshal of the Sejm (independent)
Maj. Gen. Tadeusz Płoski		54	Roman Catholic Bishop of the Military Ordinariate of the Polish Armed Forces
JWO Agnieszka Pogródka–Węcławek		35	Close protection officer
Maj. Gen. Włodzimierz Potasiński		53	Commander of the Special Forces
Capt. Arkadiusz Protasiuk		35	Pilot
Andrzej Przewoźnik		46	Secretary of the Council for the Protection of Struggle and Martyrdom Sites
Krzysztof Putra		52	Deputy Marshal of the Sejm (PiS)
Ryszard Rumianek		62	Roman Catholic priest, Rector of the Card. Wyszyński University
Arkadiusz Rybicki		57	Member of the Sejm (PO)
Andrzej Sariusz-Skąpski		72	President of the Federation of Katyn Families
Wojciech Seweryn		70	Sculptor, author of the Katyn Monument in Chicago
Sławomir Skrzypek		46	President of the National Bank of Poland
Leszek Solski		75	Representative of the Katyn Families
Władysław Stasiak		44	Head of the Chancellery of the President of the Republic of Poland, former Minister of the Interior and Administration
WO2 Jacek Surówka		36	Close protection officer
Aleksander Szczygło		46	Head of the National Security Bureau
Jerzy Szmajdziński		58	Deputy Marshal of the Sejm, former Defence Minister (SLD)
Jolanta Szymanek-Deresz		55	Member of the Sejm, former Head of the Chancellery of the President of the Republic of Poland (SLD)
Izabela Tomaszewska		54	Head of the Protocolar Unit at the Chancellery of the President of the Republic of Poland
WO2 Marek Uleryk		35	Close protection officer
Anna Walentynowicz		80	Co-founder of the Solidarity trade union
Teresa Walewska-Przyjałkowska		72	Deputy President of the Golgotha of the East Foundation
Zbigniew Wassermann		60	Member of the Sejm, former Minister for Intelligence Coördination (PiS)
Wiesław Woda		63	Member of the Sejm (PSL)
Edward Wojtas		55	Member of the Sejm (PSL)
Paweł Wypych		42	Secretary of State at the Chancellery of the President of the Republic of Poland, former President of the Social Insurance Institution
Stanisław Zając		60	Senator (PiS)
Janusz Zakrzeński		74	Theatrical and film actor, member of the Program Board of the Union of Piłsudskiites
Lt. Artur Ziętek		31	Navigator
Gabriela Zych		68	Representative of the Katyn Families

== Posthumous recognition ==
Name	Image	Promotion	Decoration
Joanna Agacka-Indecka			Officer's Cross of the Order of Polonia Restituta
Ewa Bąkowska			Knight's Cross of the Order of Polonia Restituta
Lt. Gen. Andrzej Błasik		General (NATO code OF-9)	Commander's Cross of the Order of Polonia Restituta
Krystyna Bochenek			Commander's Cross with Star of the Order of Polonia Restituta
Anna Maria Borowska			Knight's Cross of the Order of Polonia Restituta
Bartosz Borowski			Knight's Cross of the Order of Polonia Restituta
Maj. Gen. Tadeusz Buk		Lieutenant General (NATO code OF-8)	Commander's Cross of the Order of Polonia Restituta
Brig. Gen. Miron Chodakowski		Major General (NATO code OF-7)	Commander's Cross of the Order of Polonia Restituta
Lt. Col. Czesław Cywiński		Colonel	Grand Cross of the Order of Polonia Restituta
Lt. Col. Zbigniew Dębski		Colonel	Commander's Cross with Star of the Order of Polonia Restituta
Leszek Deptuła			Commander's Cross of the Order of Polonia Restituta
Grzegorz Dolniak			Commander's Cross of the Order of Polonia Restituta
Katarzyna Doraczyńska			Knight's Cross of the Order of Polonia Restituta
Edward Duchnowski			Commander's Cross with Star of the Order of Polonia Restituta
Aleksander Fedorowicz			Knight's Cross of the Order of Polonia Restituta
Janina Fetlińska			Commander's Cross of the Order of Polonia Restituta
Lt. Col. Jarosław Florczak		Colonel	Knight's Cross of the Order of Polonia Restituta
WO1 Artur Francuz		Second Lieutenant	Knight's Cross of the Order of Polonia Restituta
Gen. Franciszek Gągor			Grand Cross of the Order of Polonia Restituta
Grażyna Gęsicka			Commander's Cross of the Order of Polonia Restituta
Brig. Gen. Kazimierz Gilarski		Major General (NATO code OF-7)	Commander's Cross of the Order of Polonia Restituta
Przemysław Gosiewski			Commander's Cross with Star of the Order of Polonia Restituta
Bronisław Gostomski			Commander's Cross of the Order of Polonia Restituta
Maj. Robert Grzywna		Lieutenant Colonel	Knight's Cross of the Order of Polonia Restituta
Mariusz Handzlik			Commander's Cross of the Order of Polonia Restituta
Roman Indrzejczyk			Commander's Cross with Star of the Order of Polonia Restituta
Lt. Paweł Janeczek		Captain	Officer's Cross of the Order of Polonia Restituta
Dariusz Jankowski			Knight's Cross of the Order of Polonia Restituta
Natalia Januszko			Knight's Cross of the Order of Polonia Restituta
Izabela Jaruga-Nowacka			Commander's Cross with Star of the Order of Polonia Restituta
Józef Joniec			Officer's Cross of the Order of Polonia Restituta
Maria Kaczyńska			Grand Cross of the Order of Polonia Restituta
Lech Kaczyński			Order of the National Hero of Georgia
Sebastian Karpiniuk			Commander's Cross with Star of the Order of Polonia Restituta
RAdm. Andrzej Karweta		Admiral (NATO code OF-9)	Commander's Cross with Star of the Order of Polonia Restituta
Mariusz Kazana			Officer's Cross of the Order of Polonia Restituta "Bene Merito" Honour Badge
Janusz Kochanowski			Commander's Cross with Star of the Order of Polonia Restituta
Brig. Gen. Stanisław Komornicki		Major General (NATO code OF-7)	Commander's Cross of the Order of Polonia Restituta
WO2 Paweł Krajewski		Second Lieutenant	Commander's Cross of the Order of Polonia Restituta
Andrzej Kremer			Commander's Cross of the Order of Polonia Restituta "Bene Merito" Honour Badge
Zdzisław Król			Officer's Cross of the Order of Polonia Restituta
Janusz Krupski			Grand Cross of the Order of Polonia Restituta
Janusz Kurtyka			Grand Cross of the Order of Polonia Restituta
Andrzej Kwaśnik			Officer's Cross of the Order of Polonia Restituta
Lt. Gen. Bronisław Kwiatkowski		General (NATO code OF-9)	Commander's Cross of the Order of Polonia Restituta
Col. Wojciech Lubiński		Brigadier General	Officer's Cross of the Order of Polonia Restituta
Tadeusz Lutoborski			Knight's Cross of the Order of Polonia Restituta
Barbara Maciejczyk			Knight's Cross of the Order of Polonia Restituta
Barbara Mamińska			Officer's Cross of the Order of Polonia Restituta
Zenona Mamontowicz-Łojek			Officer's Cross of the Order of Polonia Restituta
Stefan Melak			Commander's Cross with Star of the Order of Polonia Restituta
Tomasz Merta			Commander's Cross with Star of the Order of Polonia Restituta
WO2 Andrzej Michalak		Second Lieutenant	Knight's Cross of the Order of Polonia Restituta
Capt. Dariusz Michałowski		Major	Knight's Cross of the Order of Polonia Restituta
Stanisław Mikke			Commander's Cross with Star of the Order of Polonia Restituta
Justyna Moniuszko			Knight's Cross of the Order of Polonia Restituta
Aleksandra Natalli-Świat			Commander's Cross with Star of the Order of Polonia Restituta
Janina Natusiewicz-Mirer			Knight's Cross of the Order of Polonia Restituta
2nd Lt. Piotr Nosek		Lieutenant	Knight's Cross of the Order of Polonia Restituta
Piotr Nurowski			Commander's Cross with Star of the Order of Polonia Restituta
Bronisława Orawiec-Löffler			Knight's Cross of the Order of Polonia Restituta
Lt. Col. Jan Osiński		Colonel	Knight's Cross of the Order of Polonia Restituta
Col. Adam Pilch		Brigadier General	Officer's Cross of the Order of Polonia Restituta
Katarzyna Piskorska			Knight's Cross of the Order of Polonia Restituta
Maciej Płażyński			Grand Cross of the Order of Polonia Restituta
Maj. Gen. Tadeusz Płoski		Lieutenant General (NATO code OF-8)	Commander's Cross of the Order of Polonia Restituta
JWO Agnieszka Pogródka–Węcławek		Second Lieutenant	Knight's Cross of the Order of Polonia Restituta
Maj. Gen. Włodzimierz Potasiński		Lieutenant General (NATO code OF-8)	Commander's Cross of the Order of Polonia Restituta
Capt. Arkadiusz Protasiuk		Major	Knight's Cross of the Order of Polonia Restituta
Andrzej Przewoźnik			Grand Cross of the Order of Polonia Restituta
Krzysztof Putra			Commander's Cross with Star of the Order of Polonia Restituta
Ryszard Rumianek			Commander's Cross of the Order of Polonia Restituta
Arkadiusz Rybicki			Grand Cross of the Order of Polonia Restituta
Andrzej Sariusz-Skąpski			Officer's Cross of the Order of Polonia Restituta
Wojciech Seweryn			Commander's Cross of the Order of Polonia Restituta
Sławomir Skrzypek			Commander's Cross with Star of the Order of Polonia Restituta
Leszek Solski			Knight's Cross of the Order of Polonia Restituta
Władysław Stasiak			Commander's Cross with Star of the Order of Polonia Restituta
WO2 Jacek Surówka		Second Lieutenant	Knight's Cross of the Order of Polonia Restituta
Aleksander Szczygło			Commander's Cross with Star of the Order of Polonia Restituta
Jerzy Szmajdziński			Commander's Cross with Star of the Order of Polonia Restituta
Jolanta Szymanek-Deresz			Commander's Cross with Star of the Order of Polonia Restituta
Izabela Tomaszewska			Officer's Cross of the Order of Polonia Restituta
WO2 Marek Uleryk		Second Lieutenant	Knight's Cross of the Order of Polonia Restituta
Teresa Walewska-Przyjałkowska			Knight's Cross of the Order of Polonia Restituta
Zbigniew Wassermann			Commander's Cross of the Order of Polonia Restituta
Wiesław Woda			Commander's Cross of the Order of Polonia Restituta
Edward Wojtas			Commander's Cross of the Order of Polonia Restituta
Paweł Wypych			Commander's Cross of the Order of Polonia Restituta
Stanisław Zając			Commander's Cross with Star of the Order of Polonia Restituta
Janusz Zakrzeński			Commander's Cross of the Order of Polonia Restituta
Lt. Artur Ziętek		Captain	Knight's Cross of the Order of Polonia Restituta
Gabriela Zych			Knight's Cross of the Order of Polonia Restituta

== Not on board ==
Some early reports were wrong about the number or composition as the official list of victims was corrected in stages; most notably because the flight manifest of passengers only, without names of the crew, lacked the name of the only female member of the nine Biuro Ochrony Rządu (Government Protection Bureau bodyguards), Agnieszka Pogródka-Węcławek. She was listed incorrectly among the stewardesses. Also, a female presidential aide, Zofia Kruszyńska-Gust, was supposed to fly but did not do so due to illness. Additionally, Michael Schudrich, the Chief Rabbi of Poland, was invited but did not board the flight due to its conflict with the Jewish Sabbath, which prohibits flight on Saturday.
