= Anna Borowska =

Anna Borowska may refer to:

- Anna Kuczera (born 1994), née Borowska, Polish judoka
- Anna Maria Borowska (1928–2010), Polish activist
