= List of places named after casualties of the Smolensk air disaster =

This is a list of places named after casualties of the 2010 Polish Air Force Tu-154 crash. This list includes only name changes that were accepted, e.g. by city councils.

== Streets ==
=== Georgia ===
- Lech Kaczyński Street (Georgian: ლეხ კაჩინსკის ქუჩა – Lekh Kachinskis Kucha) in Tbilisi 41.68842°N 44.83353°E
- Lech and Maria Kaczyński Street (Georgian: ლეხ და მარია კაჩინსკების ქუჩა – Lekh da Maria Kachinskebis Kucha) in Batumi 41.62487°N 41.59710°E
- Lech and Maria Kaczyński Street (Georgian: ლეხ და მარია კაჩინსკების ქუჩა – Lekh da Maria Kachinskebis Kucha) in Gori 41.99283°N 44.10572°E

=== Lithuania ===
- Lech Kaczynski Street (Lithuanian: Lecho Kačinskio gatvė) in Vilnius

=== Moldova ===
- Lech Kaczyński Street (Romanian: Strada Lech Kaczynski) in Chişinau 47.00142°N 28.80982°E

=== Poland ===
- Maciej Płażyński Roundabout (Rondo Płażyńskiego) in Sopot
- President Ryszard Kaczorowski Street (Ulica Prezydenta Ryszarda Kaczorowskiego), in Kielce
- Ryszard Kaczorowski Roundabout (Rondo Ryszarda Kaczorowskiego) in Piastow
- Ryszard Kaczorowski Street (Ulica Ryszarda Kaczorowskiego) in Białystok
- Ryszard Kaczorowski Street (Ulica Ryszarda Kaczorowskiego) in Siedlce

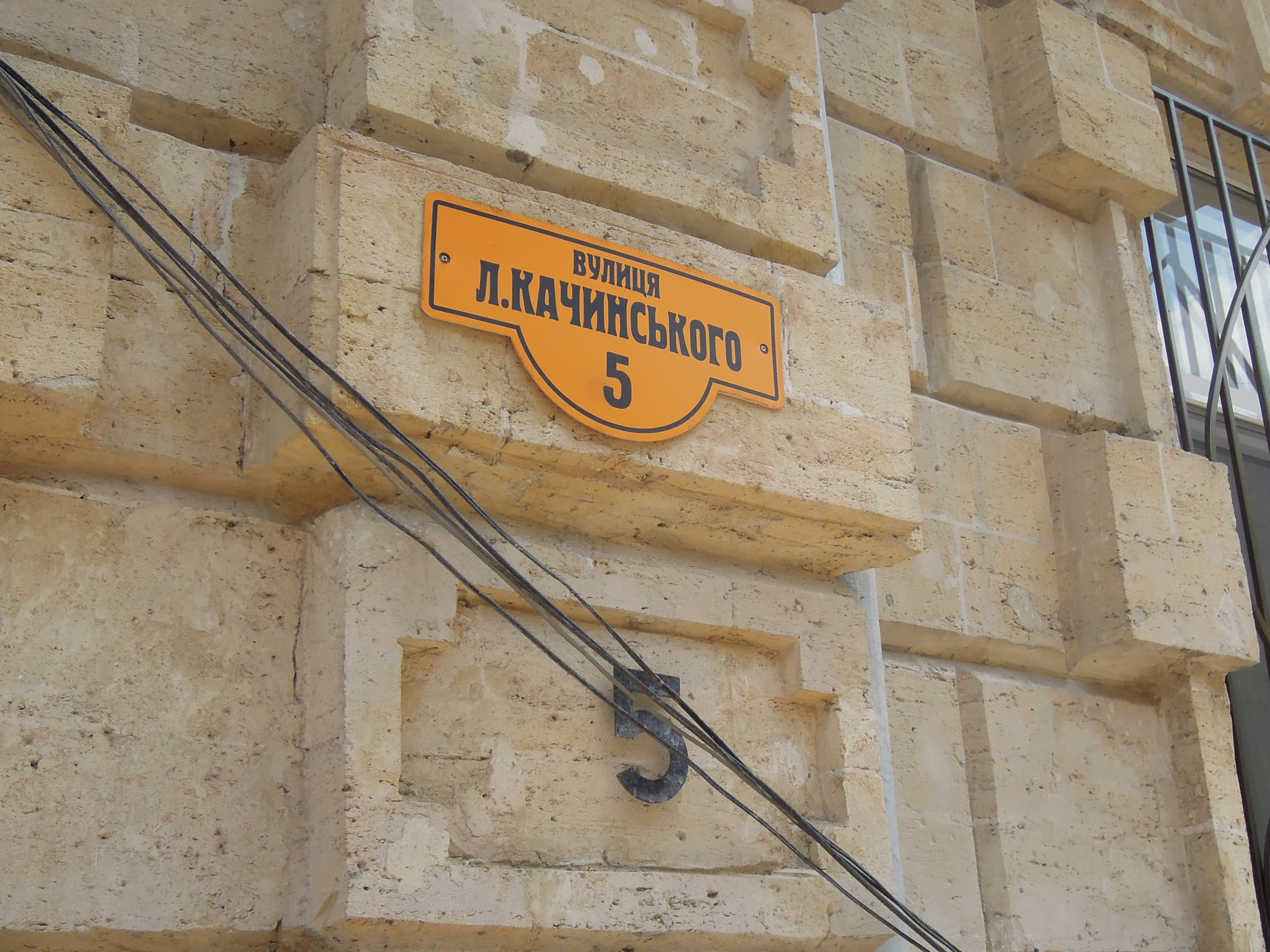
Lech Kaczyński street sign in Odesa

- Lech Kaczyński Avenue (Aleja Lecha Kaczyńskiego) in Lubin
- Lech Kaczyński Roundabout (Rondo Lecha Kaczyńskiego) in Starachowice
- Lech Kaczyński Street (Ulica Lecha Kaczyńskiego) in Siedlce
- Lech and Maria Kaczyńscy roundabout in Tomaszów Mazowiecki
- Lech Kaczyński Street (Ulica Lecha Kaczyńskiego) in Tomaszow Lubelski
- Maria and Lech Kaczyński Boulevard (Bulwar Marii i Lecha Kacyńskich) in Wrocław
- President Lech Kaczyński Street (Ulica Prezydenta Lecha Kaczyńskiego) in Kielce
- Tunnel of the Presidential Couple Lech and Maria Kaczyński (Tunel Pary Prezydenckiej Lecha i Marii Kaczyńskich) on the S7 expressway in Jordanów municipality

==== Former ====
- Lech Kaczyński Street (Ulica Lecha Kaczyńskiego) in Warsaw (given this name in 2017 but reverted to former name of Aleja Armii Ludowiej in 2018)

=== Ukraine ===
- Lech Kaczyński Street (Ukrainian: Вулиця Леха Качинського – Vulitsa Lekha Kachyns'koho) in Odesa 46.48293°N 30.74493°E
- Lech Kaczyński Street (Ukrainian: Вулиця Леха Качинського – Vulitsa Lekha Kachyns'koho) in Khmelnytskyi 49.42711°N 26.94987°E
- Lech Kaczyński Street (Ukrainian: Вулиця Леха Качинського – Vulitsa Lekha Kachyns'koho) in Zhytomyr 50.2494°N 28.6560°E
- Lech Kaczyński Street (Ukrainian: Вулиця Леха Качинського – Vulitsa Lekha Kachyns'koho) in Bucha 50.5605°N 30.2071°E

== Bridges ==
=== Poland ===
- President Lech Kaczyński Bridge (Most im. Prezydenta RP Lecha Kaczyńskiego) in Bydgoszcz

== Squares and parks ==
=== Georgia ===
- Lech Kaczyński Park (Georgian: ლეხ კაჩინსკის სკვერი – Lekh Kachinskis Skveri) in Tbilisi 41.68952°N 44.83380°E

=== Poland ===
- Lech and Maria Kaczyński Park (Park im. Lecha i Marii Kaczyńskich) in Sopot
- Arkadiusz Rybicki Square (Skwer im. Arkadiusza Rybickiego) in Sopot
