= Roman Indrzejczyk =

Polish Catholic priest (1931–2010)

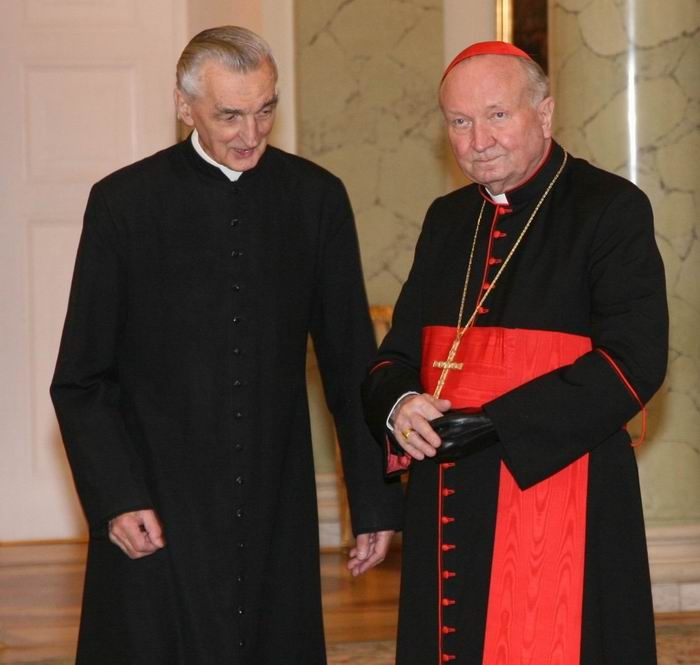
Roman Indrzejczyk (left)

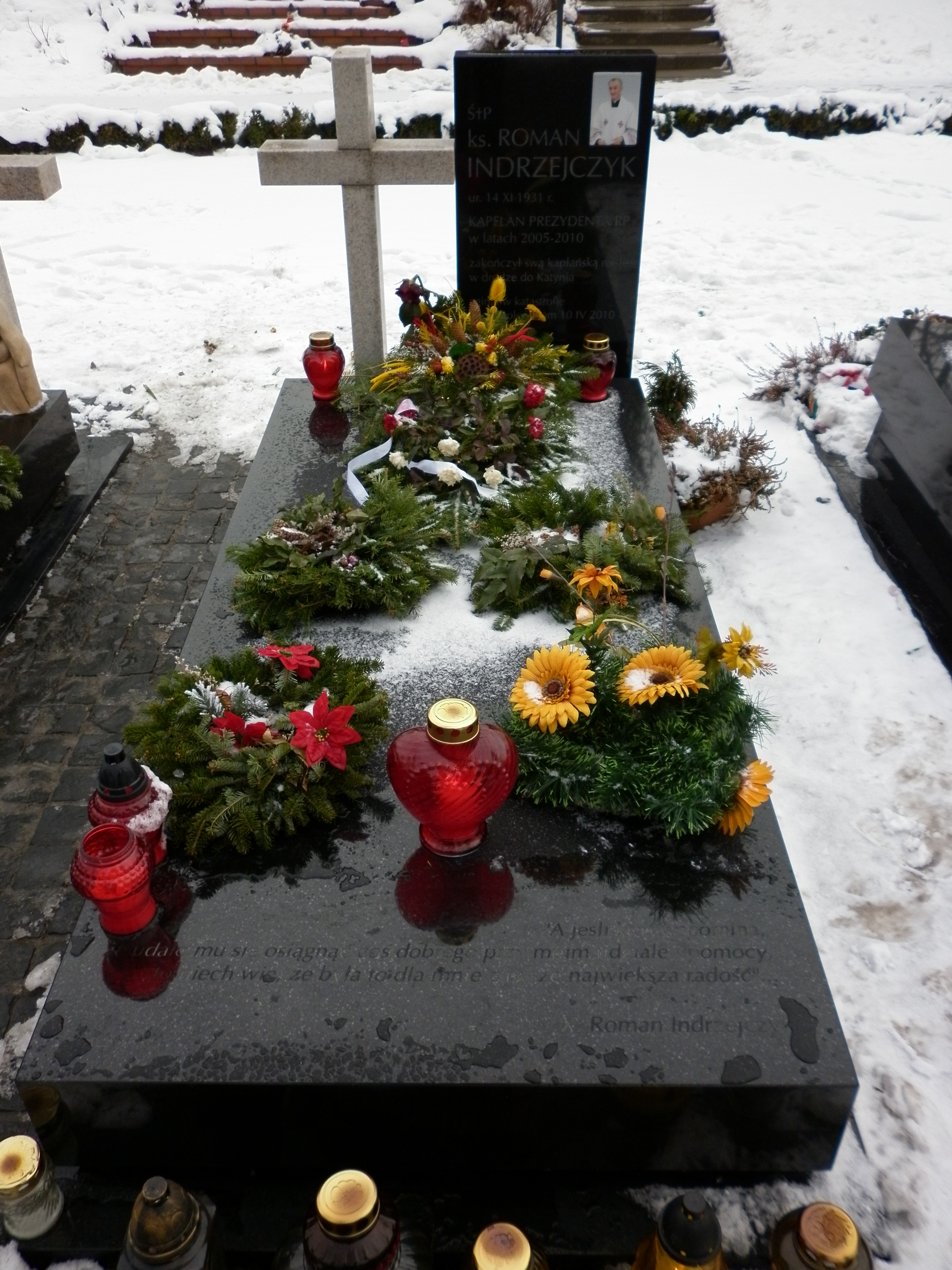
The tomb of Roman Indrzejczyk

Roman Indrzejczyk (14 November 1931 – 10 April 2010) was a Polish Catholic priest, from 2005 to 2010 he was chaplain of the Polish President, Lech Kaczyński.

== Life ==
Roman Indrzejczyk was born in Żychlin. In 1951 he graduated at the Lyceum of Adam Mickiewicz in Żychlin. Indrzejczyk was ordained to the priesthood on 8 December 1956 by Bishop Stefan Wyszyński. First he was the vicar in Drwalew and Grodzisk Mazowiecki, then in St. Alexander's Church in Warsaw, St. Mary's Church in Warsaw New Town and Church of Our Lady of Loreto in Warsaw. From 1964 to 1986, he was the rector of St. Edward's Church in Pruszków and priest of the Hospital in Tworki. From 1986 to 2004, he was the rector of Infant Jesus Church in Żoliborz, district of Warsaw. He was a teacher at the National Music School in Warsaw. In the years 1961–1976 and 1989–1994, chaplain of the health service. From 22 December 2005 until his death, he was a Roman Catholic Chaplain of the Polish President, Lech Kaczyński.

He died on 10 April 2010, in the 2010 Polish Air Force Tu-154 crash in Smolensk, Russia.

== Honours and awards ==
Commander's Cross with Star of the Order of Polonia Restituta - 2010, posthumously
Medal of Merit for Tolerance "- 1998
Commander of the Order of Merit - 2008, Portugal

== Works ==
- Rozważania o człowieczeństwie (zasłyszane w parafii). Warszawa: MATREK Jerzy Pusiak, 2003.
- I niech tak zostanie... niektóre myśli sercem wysłuchane. Warszawa: MATREK Jerzy Pusiak, 2005.
- Człowiek dla człowieka. Rozmowy z ludźmi i...historią. Warszawa: MATREK Jerzy Pusiak, 2006.
- Mądrym być człowiekiem. Warszawa: Jerzy Pusiak, 2007.
- Wiersze wybrane. Rozważania o człowieczeństwie. Warszawa: Towarzystwo Przyjaźni Polsko-Francuskiej, 2008.
- W pamięci zapisane. Warszawa: Jerzy Pusiak, 2008.
- Tak różni jesteśmy.... Warszawa: Jerzy Pusiak, 2009.
- Myśli zebrane 1961-2010 Warszawa: 2011, Anna Pawlak i Lucyna Gulazdowska, ISBN 978-83-62761-24-1
