= Sebastian Karpiniuk =

Polish politician (1972–2010)

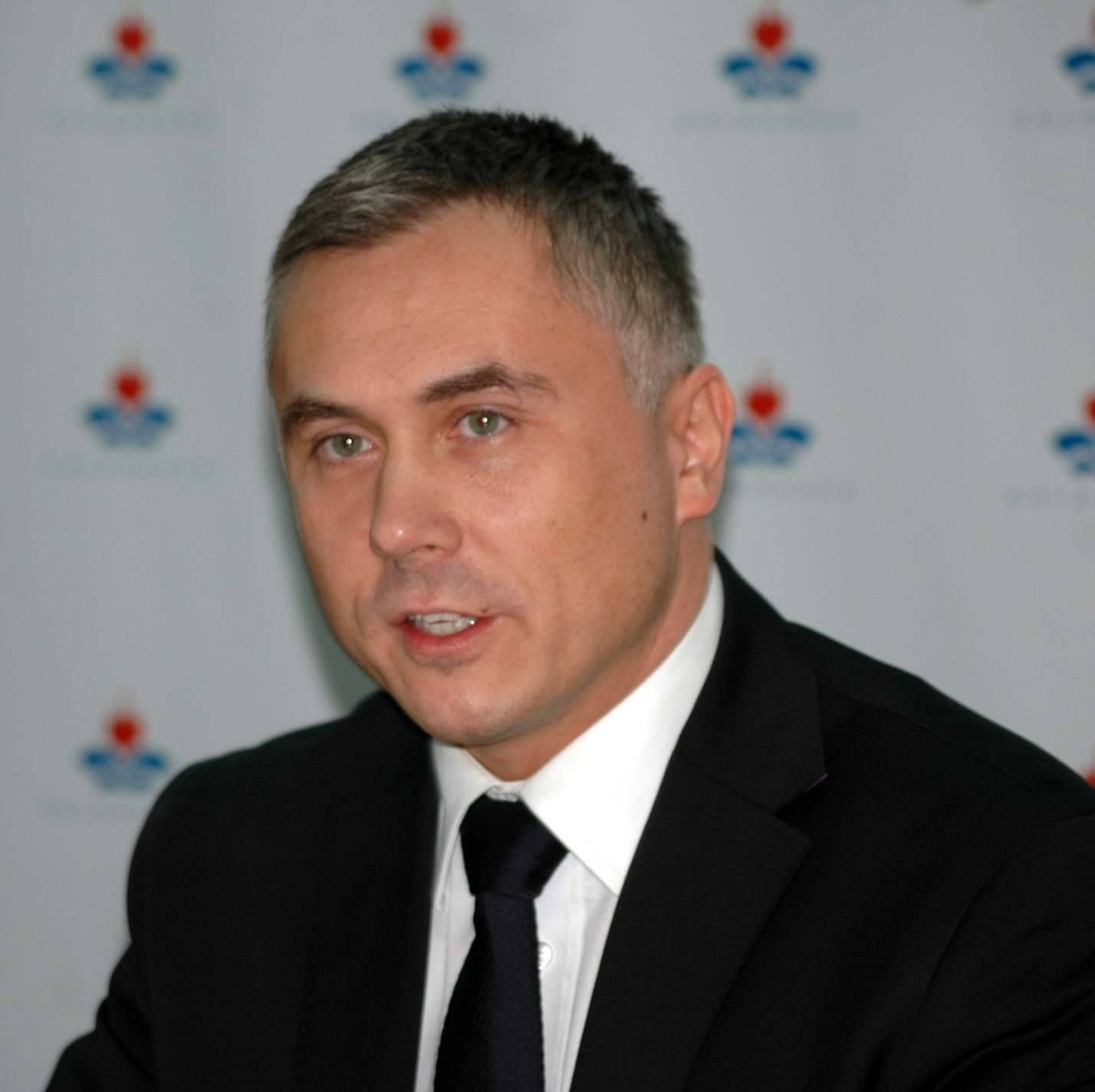
- Karpiniuk in March 2010

Member of the Sejm
- In office 25 September 2005 – 10 April 2010

Personal details
- Born: 4 December 1972
- Died: 10 April 2010 (aged 37) Smolensk, Russia
- Party: Civic Platform

Sebastian Marek Karpiniuk (4 December 1972 – 10 April 2010) was a Polish politician.

== Political career ==
Karpiniuk was an assistant to the President of Kołobrzeg Henryk Bienowski before becoming politically independent.

He was elected to the Sejm on 25 September 2005, getting 9767 votes in the Koszalin constituency, as a candidate from the Civic Platform list. In the 2007 parliamentary election, he ran on the same ticket in the same district as second on the list, and was elected to the Sejm with 25,827 votes (incl. 8169 in Kołobrzeg).

He was listed on the flight manifest of the Tupolev Tu-154 of the 36th Special Aviation Regiment carrying the President of Poland Lech Kaczyński which crashed near Smolensk-North airport near Pechersk near Smolensk, Russia, on 10 April 2010, killing all on board.

To honor his memory, in April 2010, the City Council of Kołobrzeg passed the resolution to name the newly built football stadium 'The Sebastian Karpiniuk Municipal Football Stadium' (Miejski Stadion Piłkarski im. Sebastiana Karpiniuka). On 16 April 2010, Karpiniuk was posthumously awarded the Commander's Cross of the Order of Polonia Restituta.

== Personal life ==
Sebastian Karpiniuk was born in Kołobrzeg. He attended the Mikołaj Kopernik secondary school in Kołobrzeg and studied law in Gdańsk. Until his death, he lived for many years in a block of apartments at Waska Street in Kołobrzeg. His mother died when he was a teenager as a result of fire in their apartment. His father was elected to the City Council in the local government elections of November 2010.

== See also ==
- Members of Polish Sejm 2005-2007
