= Kazimierz Gilarski =

Polish military figure and Commander of the Warsaw Garrison (1955-2010)

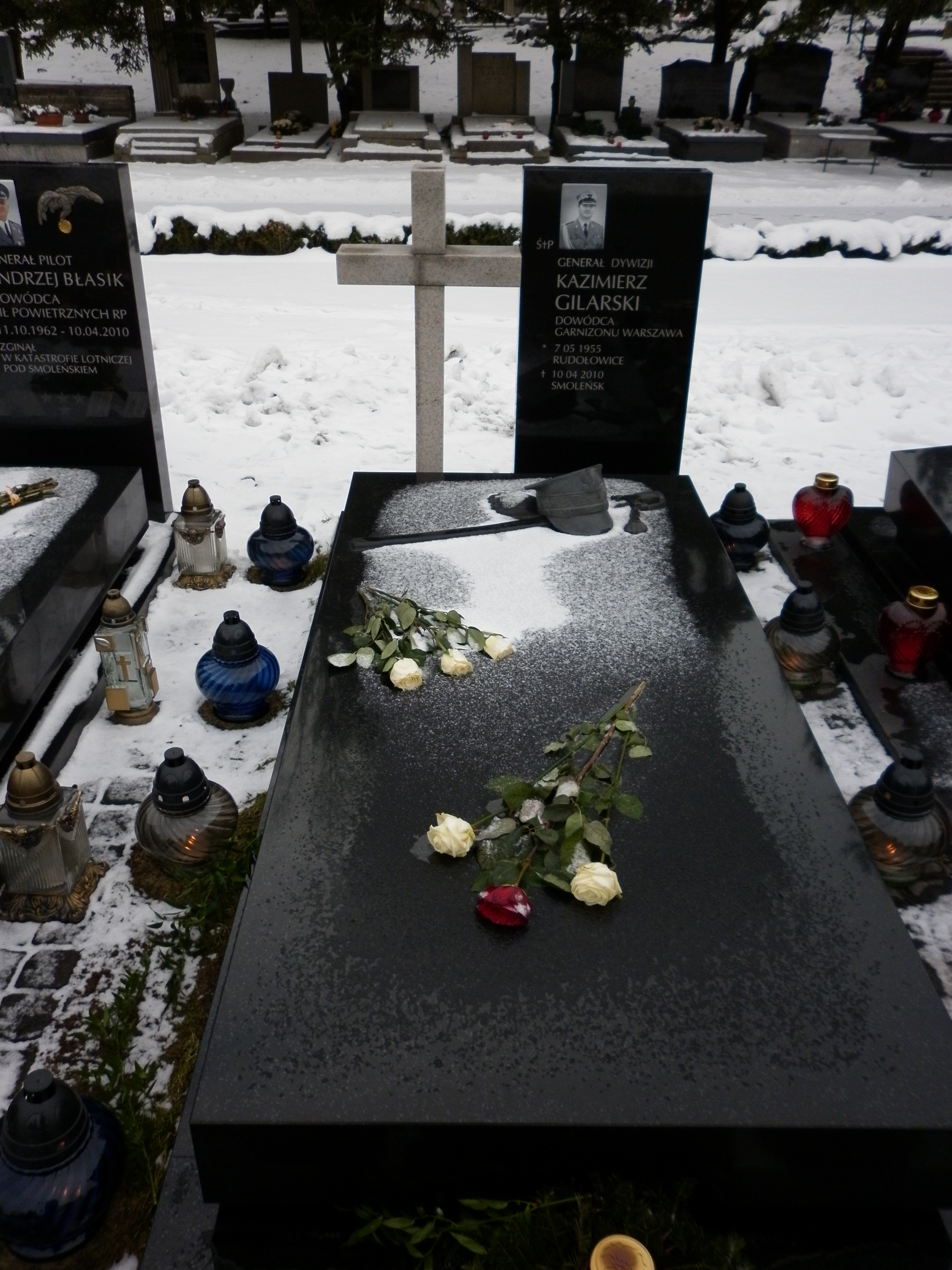
Kazimierz Gilarski gave in Powązki

Brigadier General Kazimierz Gilarski (7 May 1955 in Rudołowice – 10 April 2010 in Smolensk) was a Polish military figure and Commander of the Warsaw Garrison. He was among the passengers killed in the 2010 Polish Air Force Tu-154 crash.

== Honours and awards ==
He was awarded several top Polish civil and military awards:

Commander's Cross of the Order of Polonia Restituta (2010, posthumously); Officer's Cross (2008), Knight's Cross (2004)
Gold Cross of Merit (1999), Silver Cross (1991)
Silver Medal in the Service of the Armed Forces of the Fatherland (1988)
Gold Medal for his contribution to national defense (1998)
Gold Medal Guardian Memorials National (2008)
Badge of Honour "Bene Merito" (2009)
Grand Officer of the Order of Merit (Portugal) (2008)
