= Ewa Bąkowska =

Polish activist (1962-2010)

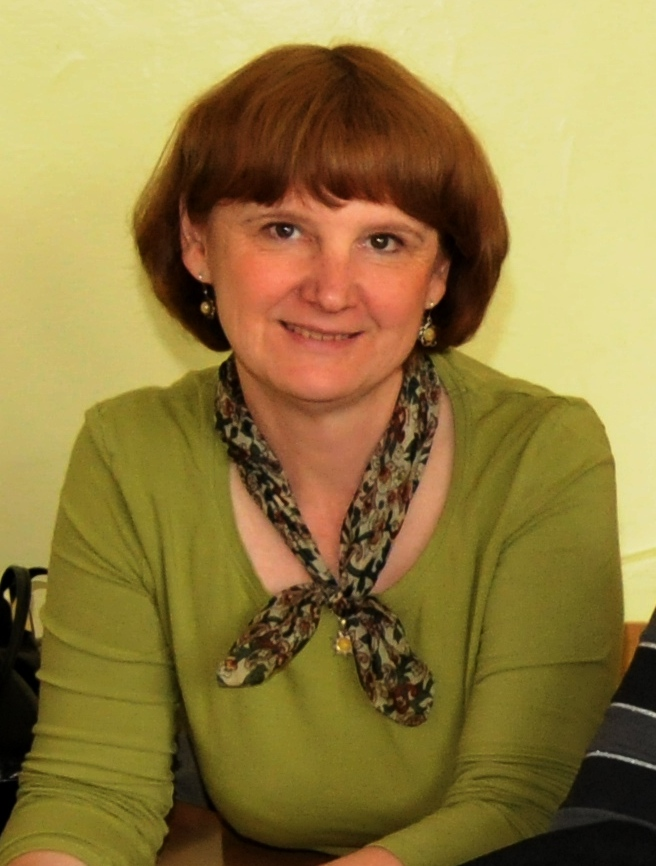
Ewa Bąkowska

Ewa Bąkowska (2 August 1962 – 10 April 2010) was a Polish librarian, activist and representative of the Katyn Families.

She died in the 2010 Polish Air Force Tu-154 crash near Smolensk on 10 April 2010. She is buried in the Salwator Cemetery. She was posthumously awarded the Order of Polonia Restituta.

== Awards ==
- Bronze Cross of Merit (2001)
- Medal for Long Service (2008)
- Knight's Cross of the Order of Polonia Restituta (2010)
