= Andrzej Kwaśnik =

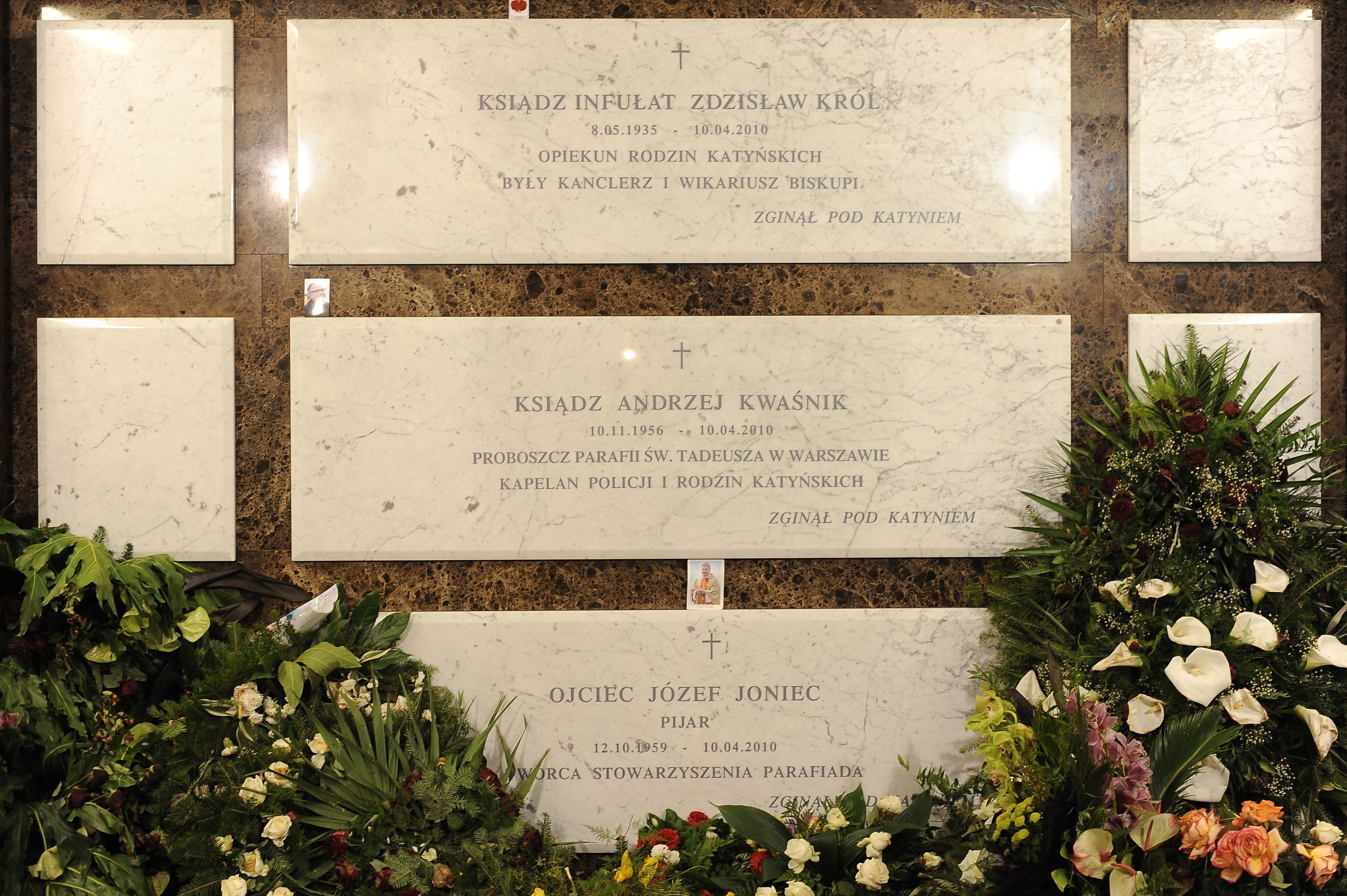
Panteon grave

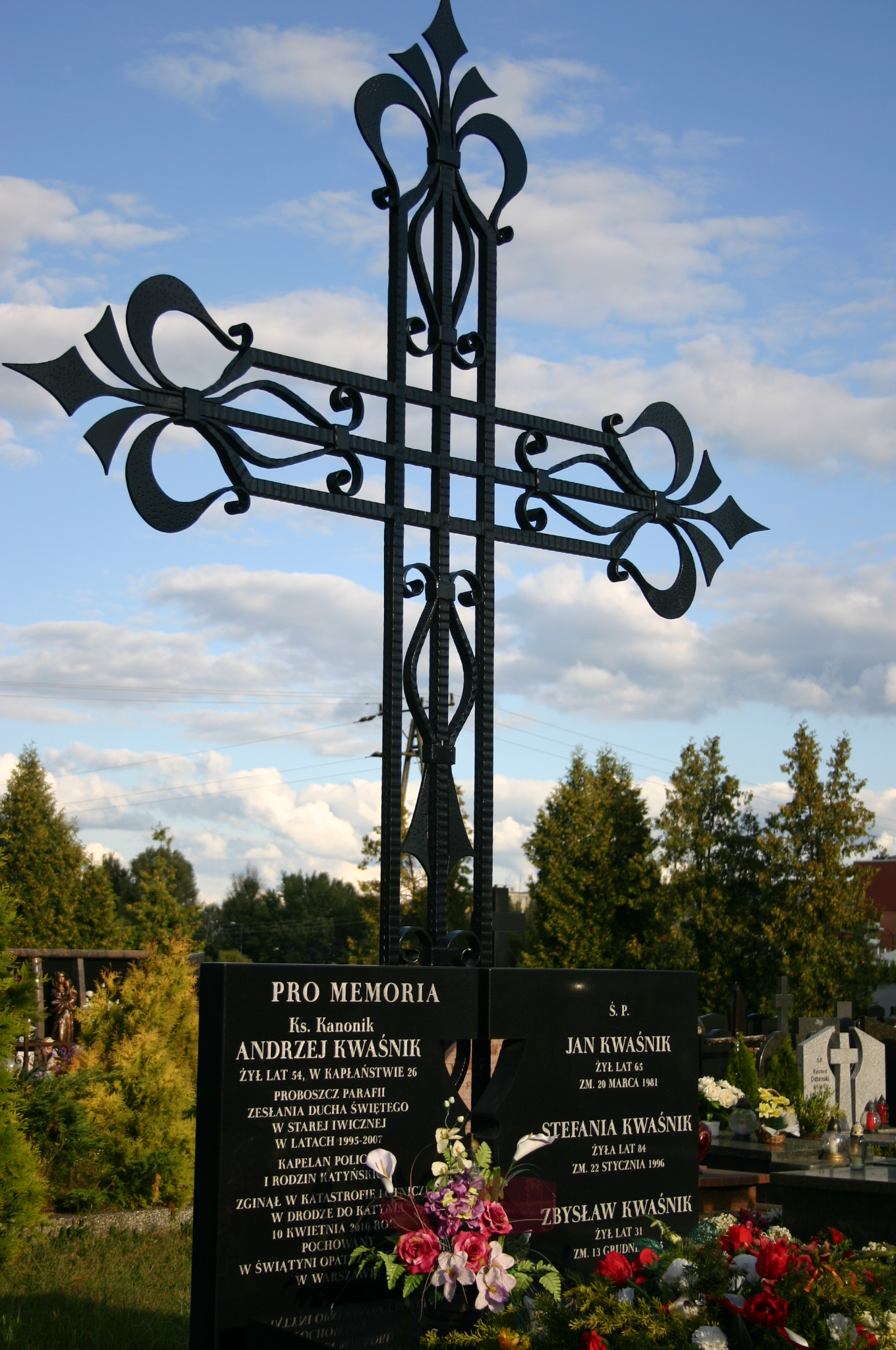
Former Evangelical cemetery (now Roman Catholic) in Stara Iwiczna, reg. No 1471

Andrzej Kwaśnik (11 November 1956 – 10 April 2010) was a Polish Roman Catholic priest.

He died in the 2010 Polish Air Force Tu-154 crash near Smolensk on 10 April 2010. He was posthumously awarded the Order of Polonia Restituta.
