= Adam Pilch =

Polish military chaplain (1965–2010)

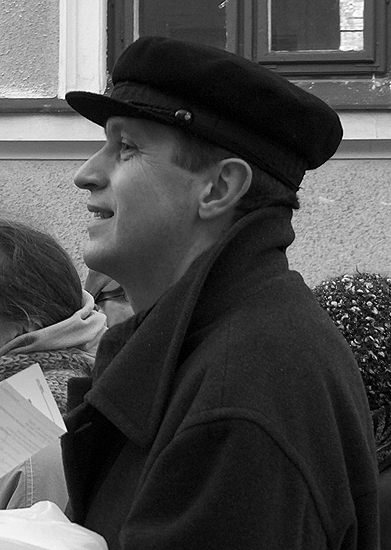

Adam Pilch (26 June 1965 in Wisła – 10 April 2010) was a Polish Lutheran clergy and military chaplain.

He died in the 2010 Polish Air Force Tu-154 crash near Smolensk on 10 April 2010. He is buried at the Evangelical Cemetery of the Augsburg Confession in Warsaw. He was posthumously awarded the Order of Polonia Restituta.
