= Włodzimierz Potasiński =

Polish military figure

Włodzimierz Potasiński (31 July 1956 – 10 April 2010) was a Polish military figure, commander-in-chief of the Polish Special Forces.

Potasiński was born at Czeladź. He was killed in the 2010 Polish Air Force Tu-154 crash at Smolensk.

== Honours and awards ==
Potasiński was awarded numerous civil and military awards, including the Order of Polonia Restituta in 2006.

- Commander's Cross of the Order of Polonia Restituta (2010, posthumously) previously awarded the Knight's Cross (2006)
- Gold Cross of Merit (2000)
- Silver Cross of Merit (1993)
- Gold Medal in the Service of the Armed Forces of the Homeland
- Gold Medal for his contribution to national defence
- Commemorative medal of the Multinational Division Central-South Iraq
- Meritorious Service Medal (2006, United States)
- United States Special Operations Command Medal (2010, United States, posthumously)
- Grand Officer of the Order of Merit (2008, Portugal)
- UN Medal UNDOF mission
- entry in the "Book of Honour of the Minister of National Defence" (2007)
