= Tadeusz Lutoborski =

Polish activist

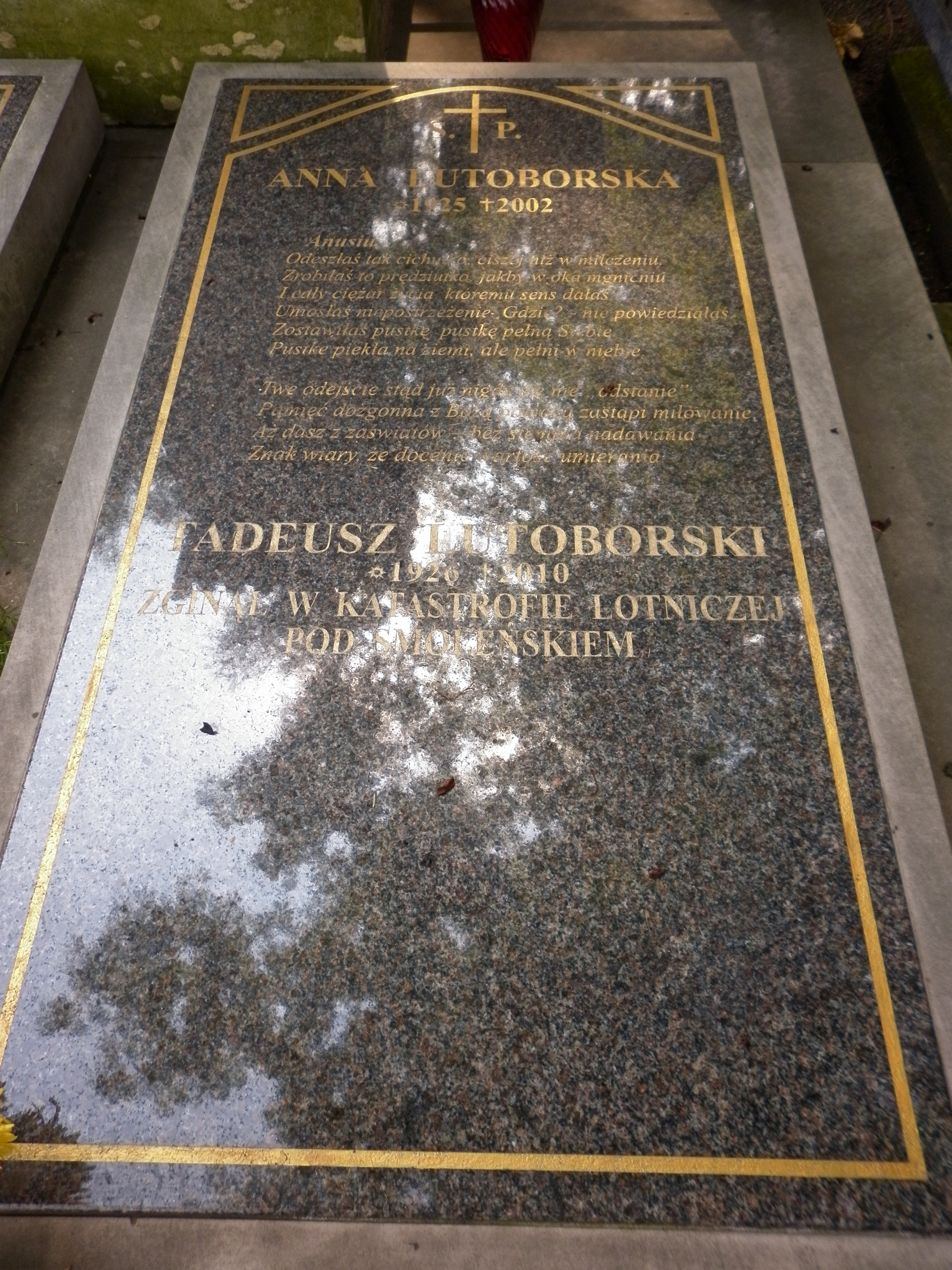
He is buried at the Powązki Cemetery

Tadeusz Lutoborski (6 June 1926 – 10 April 2010) was a Polish activist and representative of the Katyn families.

He died in the 2010 Polish Air Force Tu-154 crash near Smolensk on 10 April 2010. He was posthumously awarded the Order of Polonia Restituta.
