= Wojciech Lubiński =

Polish physician (1969–2010)

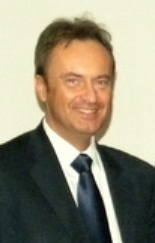
Wojciech Lubiński

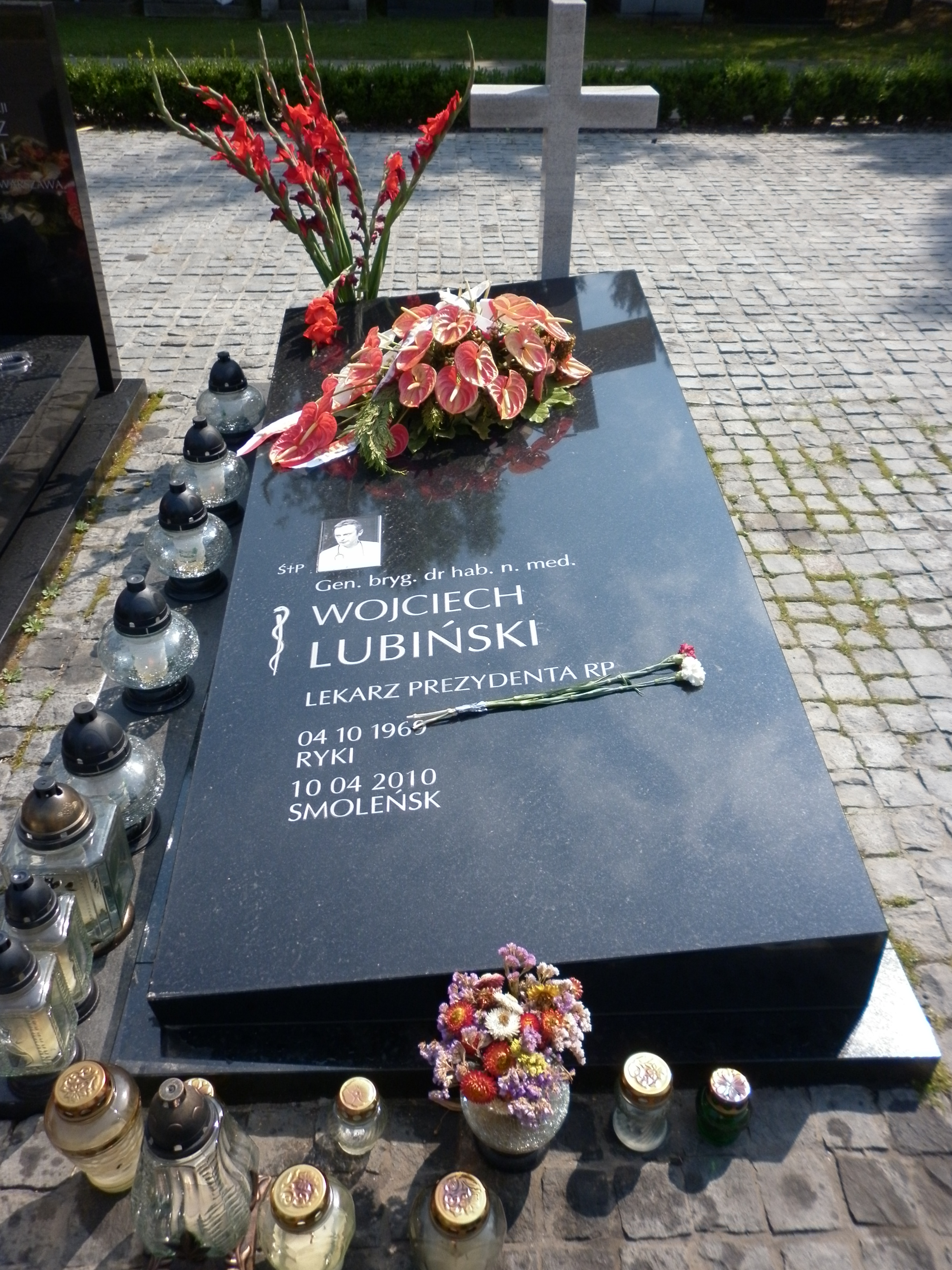
He is buried at the Powązki Military Cemetery

Wojciech Lubiński (4 October 1969 in Ryki – 10 April 2010) was a Polish physician and general Polish Armed Force. He was personal physician to Lech Kaczyński.

He died in the 2010 Polish Air Force Tu-154 crash near Smolensk on 10 April 2010. He was posthumously awarded the Order of Polonia Restituta.
