= Mariusz Kazana =

Polish diplomat and political figure

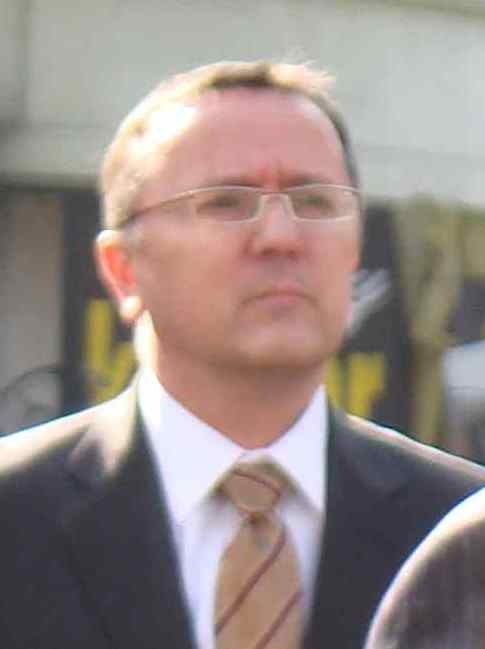
- Mariusz Kazana – Director of the MFA Diplomatic Protocol

Director of Diplomatic Protocol Ministry
- In office 2008–2010

Personal details
- Born: 5 August 1960 Bydgoszcz, Poland
- Died: 10 April 2010 (aged 49) Smolensk, Russia

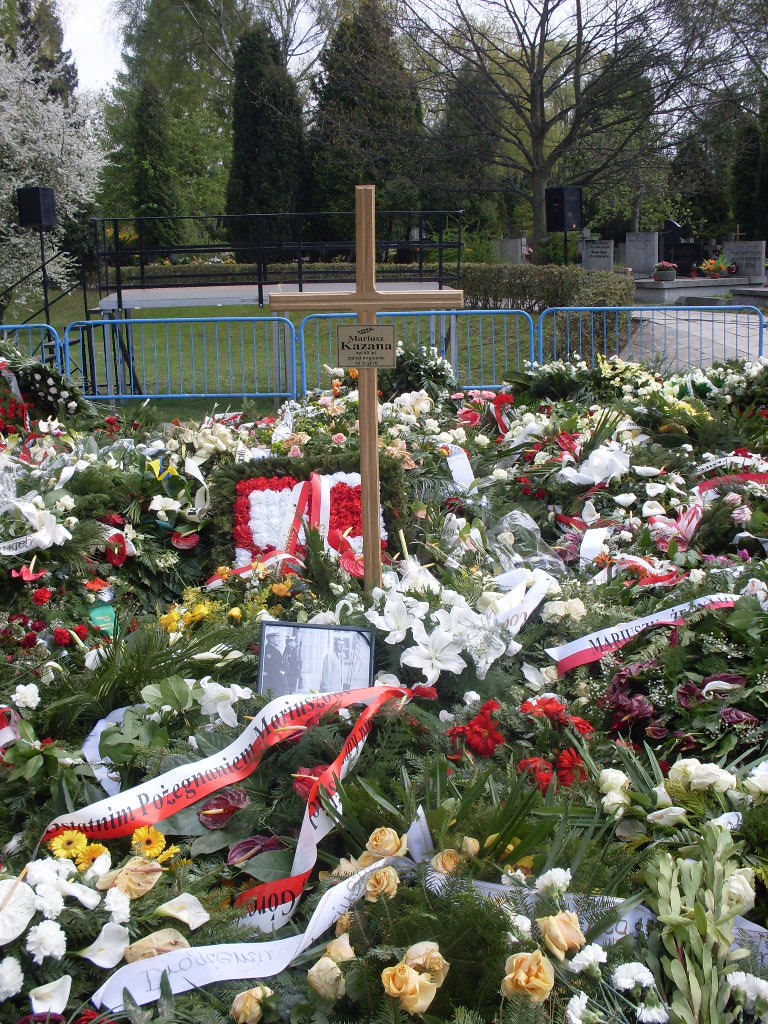
Mariusz Kazana tomb 2010

Mariusz Kazana (5 August 1960 – 10 April 2010) was a Polish diplomat and political figure.

Kazana was born in Bydgoszcz and studied law at the University of Warsaw. He served as Director of Diplomatic Protocol in the Ministry of Foreign Affairs until his death in the 2010 Polish Air Force Tu-154 crash near Smolensk.

He was buried in the Powązki Military Cemetery with full military honours, including an honour guard and gun salute.

The Mariusz Kazana Foundation was created in his memory on 29 September 2010, and is headed by Kazana's widow, Barbara Kazana, who serves as the foundation's president. The foundation aims to "build a positive image of Poland by popularising culture and art in the country and abroad and [strengthen] international artistic exchange".

== Honours and awards ==
- Grand Officer of the Order of Merit of the Portuguese Republic - 2008
- National Order of Merit of the Republic of Malta, Class IV - 2009
- Commander's Cross of the Order Pro Merito Melitensi - 2009
- Knight's Cross of the Order of Merit of the Republic of Hungary - 2009
- Officer's Cross of the Order of Polonia Restituta - 2010, posthumously
- Badge of Honour "Bene Merito" - 2010, posthumously
- Titular diplomatic ambassador - 2010, posthumously
- Medal of Merit for the Police - 2010, posthumously
