= Joanna Agacka-Indecka =

Polish politician (1964-2010)

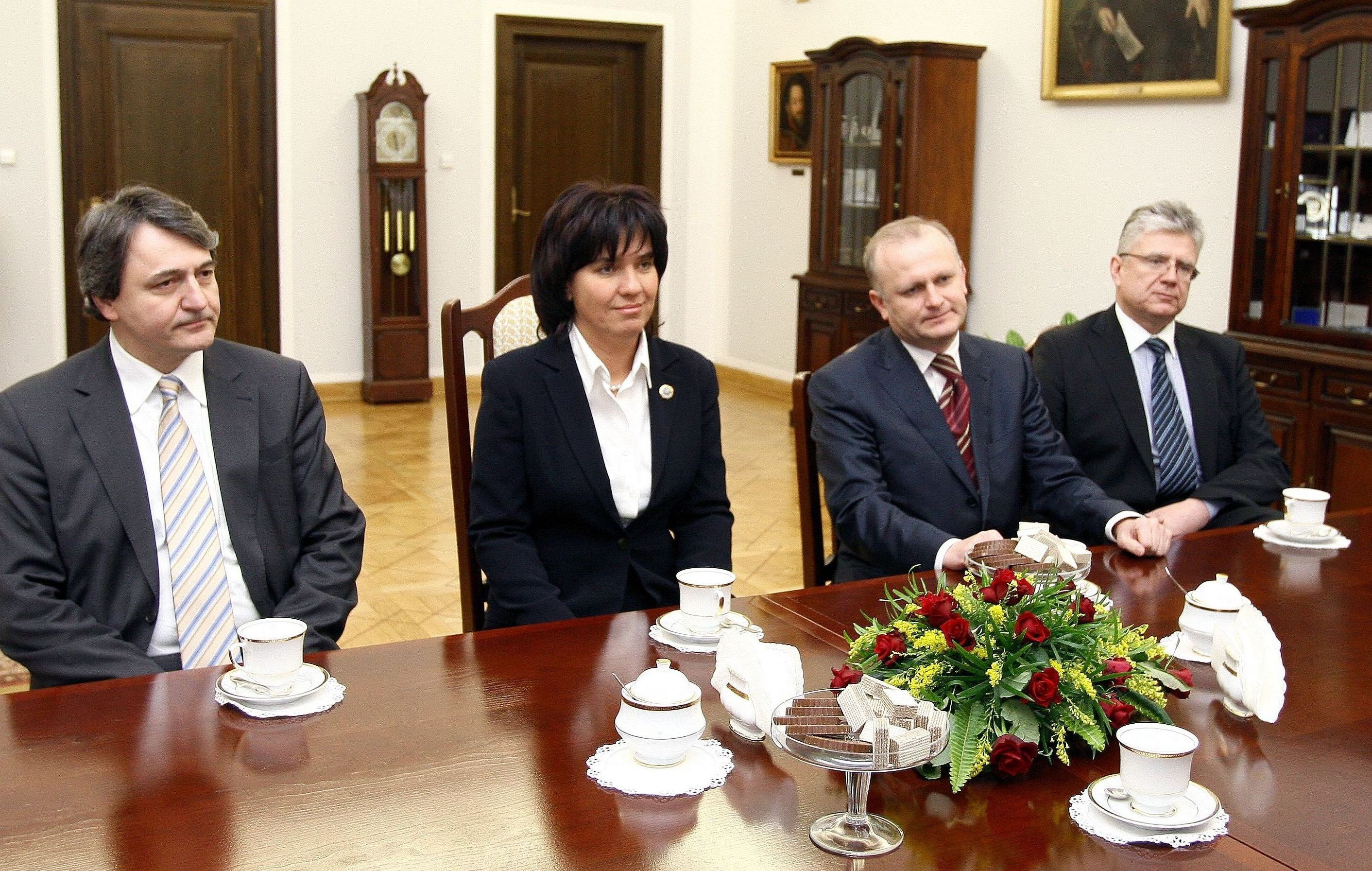
Joanna Agacka-Indecka with the Presidium of the Polish Bar Council members (2008)

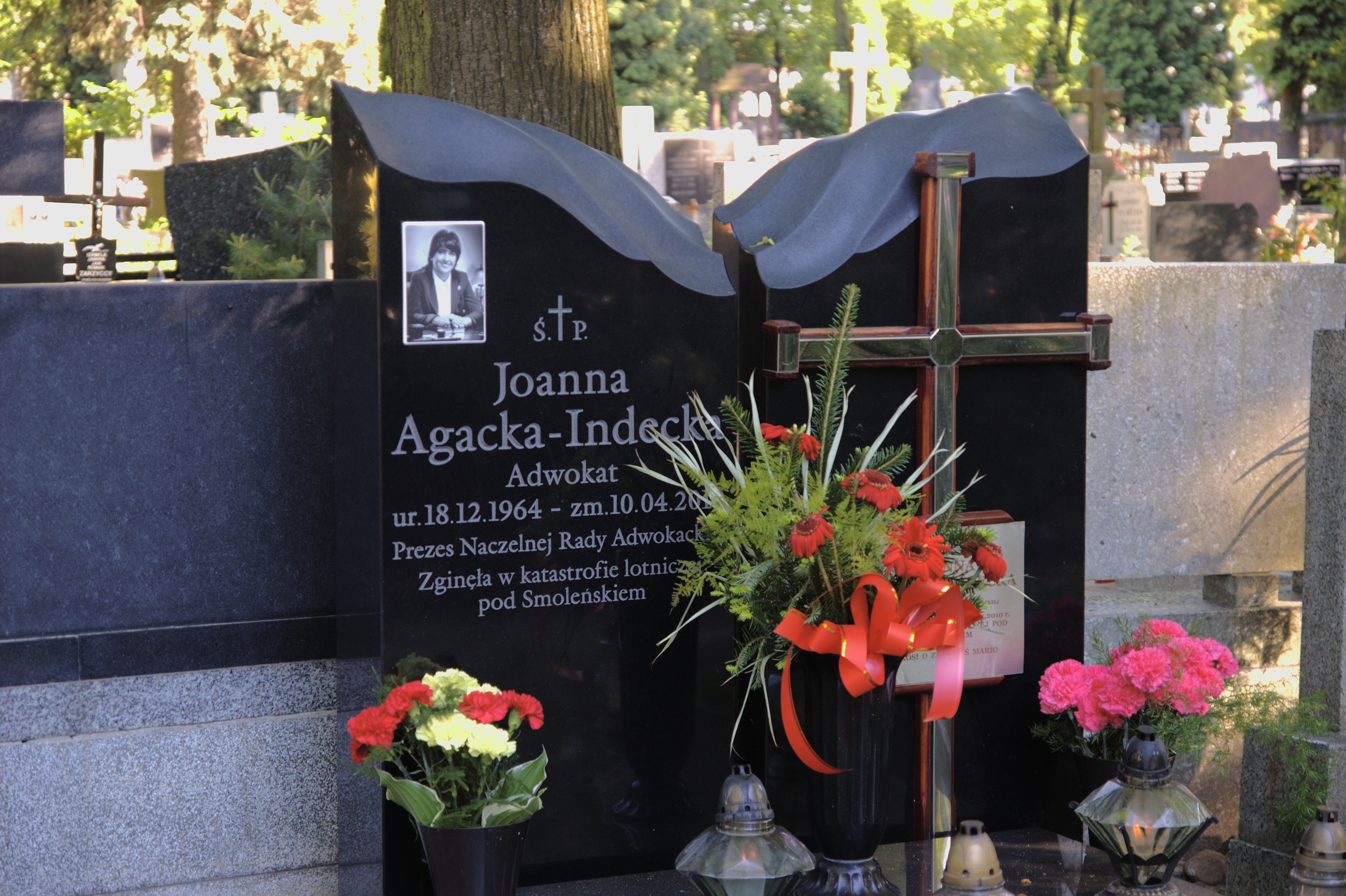
Grave in Łódź

Joanna Agacka-Indecka (18 December 1964 in Łódź – 10 April 2010) was a Polish attorney, President of the Polish Bar Council from 2007 until 2010.

== Biography ==
Joanna Agacka-Indecka graduated from the University of Łódź and then was assistant professor at the Chair of Penal Procedure of the Faculty of Law and Administration of the same university (1988–2001). Between 1992 and 1993, she worked in law firms in the United States and the United Kingdom, as well as at DePaul University College of Law in Chicago, Illinois, USA. She received training for attorneys of the International Criminal Court at the Academy of European Law in Trier.

In 1994, she was elected member of the Human Rights Commission at the Polish Bar Council, then served as member of the District Bar Council in Łódź. She was elected vice president of the Polish Bar Council in 2004 and served as its president from 2007 until 2010.

Joanna Agacka-Indecka was a legislation expert at the Sejm and was involved in lawmaking as representative of the Polish Bar.

On 27 June 2009, she received the Knight's Cross of the Order of Polonia Restituta. On 15 February 2010, she was called to the Codification Commission on Penal Law at the Ministry of Justice of the Republic of Poland.

She was killed in the 2010 Polish Air Force Tu-154 crash near Smolensk, Russia and was posthumously awarded the Officer's Cross of the Polonia Restituta.
