= Stanisław Mikke =

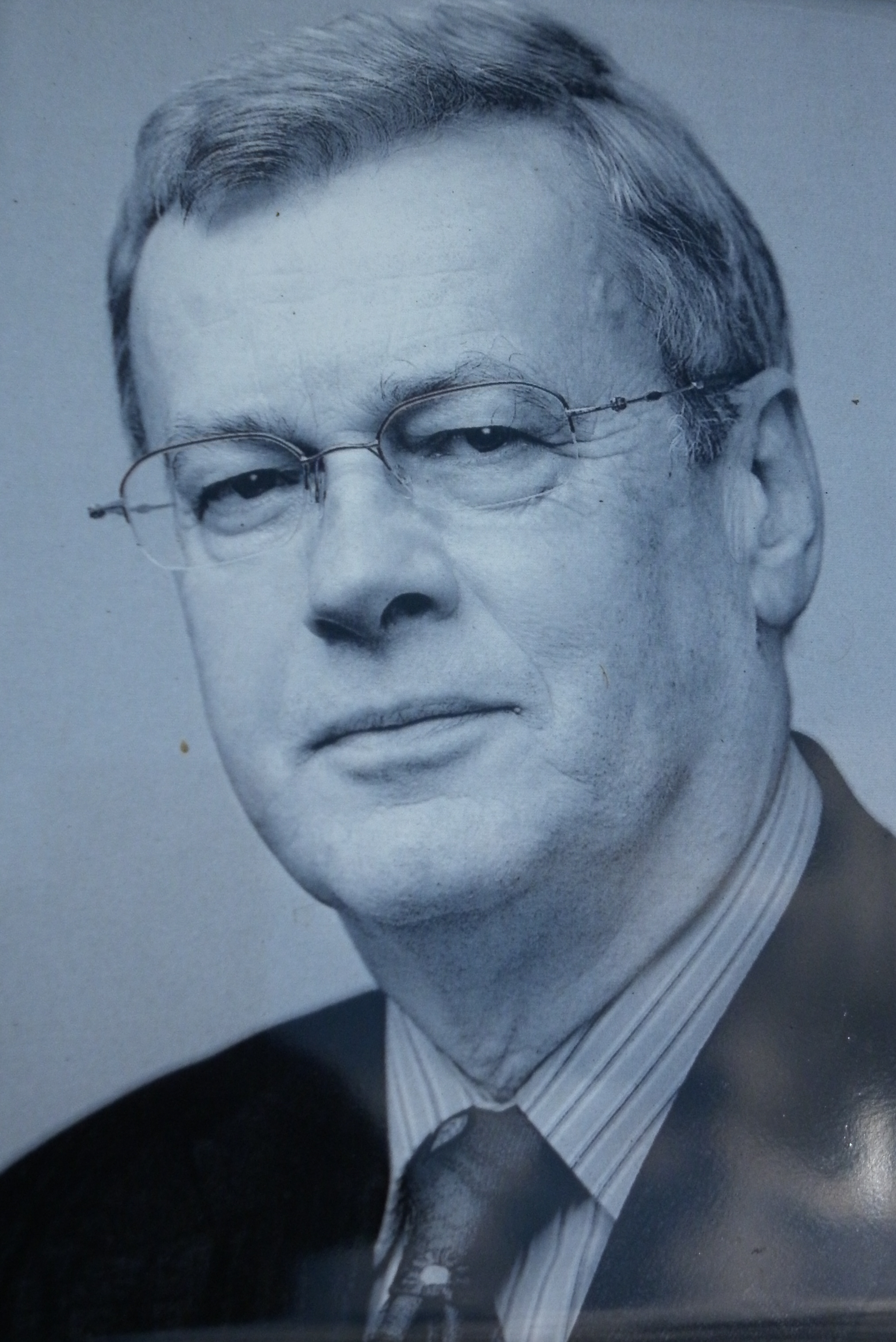
Stanisław Mikke

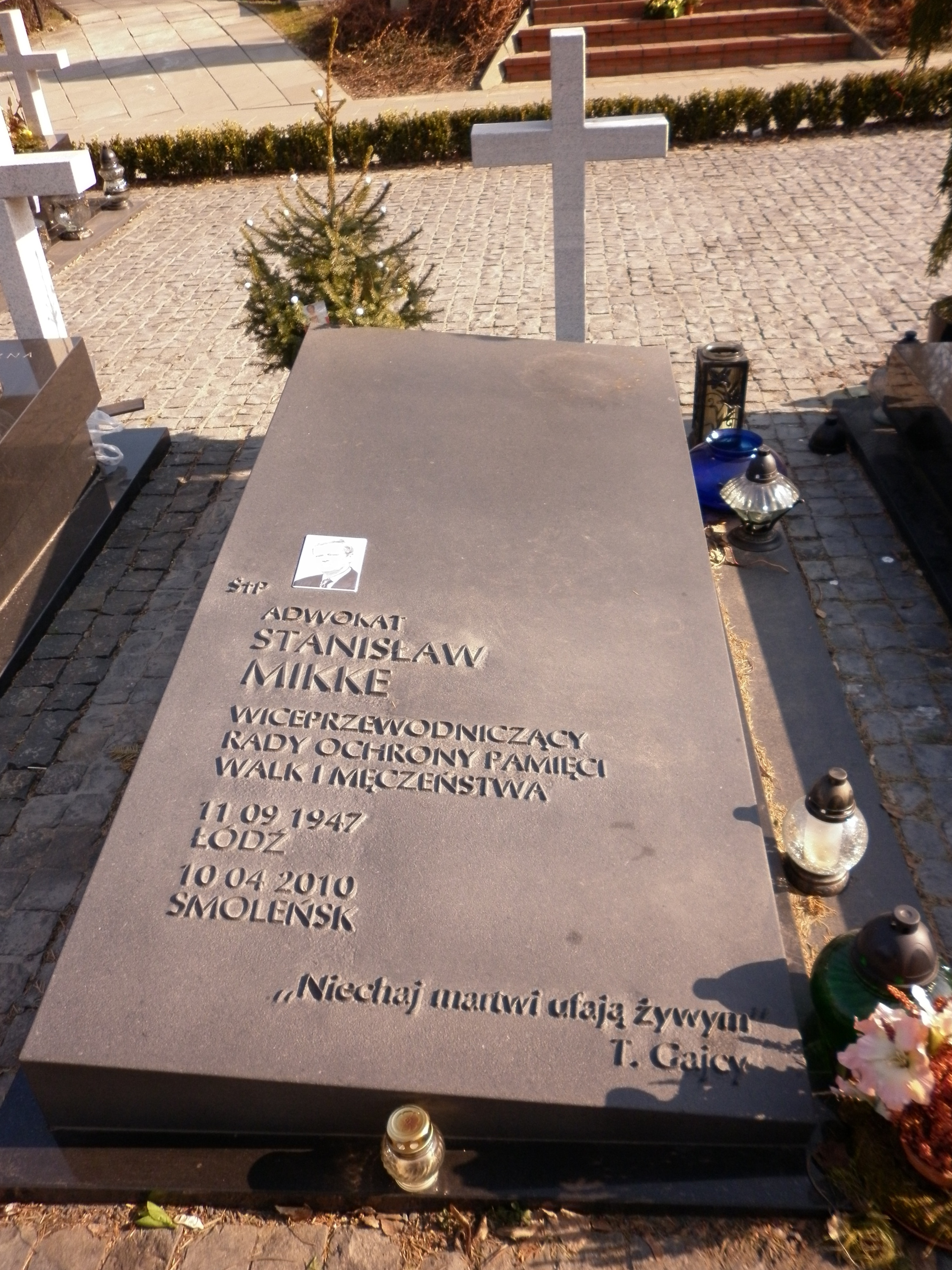
He is buried at the Powązki Military Cemetery

Stanisław Wojciech Mikke (11 September 1947 in Łódź – 10 April 2010) was a Polish lawyer. He was Deputy Head of the Council for the Protection of Struggle and Martyrdom Sites.

He died in the 2010 Polish Air Force Tu-154 crash near Smolensk on 10 April 2010. He was posthumously awarded the Order of Polonia Restituta.
