= Bronisław Gostomski =

Polish Catholic priest (1948-2010)

Bronisław Gostomski (9 November 1948 in Sierpc – 10 April 2010) was a Polish Roman Catholic priest. He was chaplain to Ryszard Kaczorowski.

He was ordained on 18 June 1972 in Płock Cathedral. He later worked as a vicar in Wyszogród and Płock. Between 1974 and 1979 he studied at the Faculty of Humanities of the Catholic University of Lublin, obtaining a master's degree in history. From 1979 he worked in the United Kingdom, where he served as parish priest of Our Lady Mother of the Church in Ealing, London. In 1982 he served as pastor in Peterborough, and then from June 1990 in Bradford. In March 2003 he was appointed by Pope John Paul II the prelate of his Holiness, and in September 2003 he became pastor of the parish of St. Andrew Bobola in Shepherd's Bush, London. He was also the chaplain of the Polish ex-Combatants Association in Great Britain.

He died in the 2010 Polish Air Force Tu-154 crash near Smolensk on 10 April 2010. He was posthumously awarded the Order of Polonia Restituta.
