= Izabela Tomaszewska =

Polish archaeologist

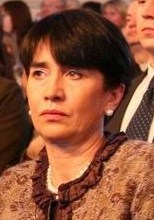
- Born: Izabela Głowacka; 13 September 1955; Kwidzyn, Poland
- Died: 10 April 2010 (aged 54); Smolensk, Russia
- Education: University of Warsaw
- Occupations: Archeologist, government protocol director
- Known for: Killed in Smolensk air disaster

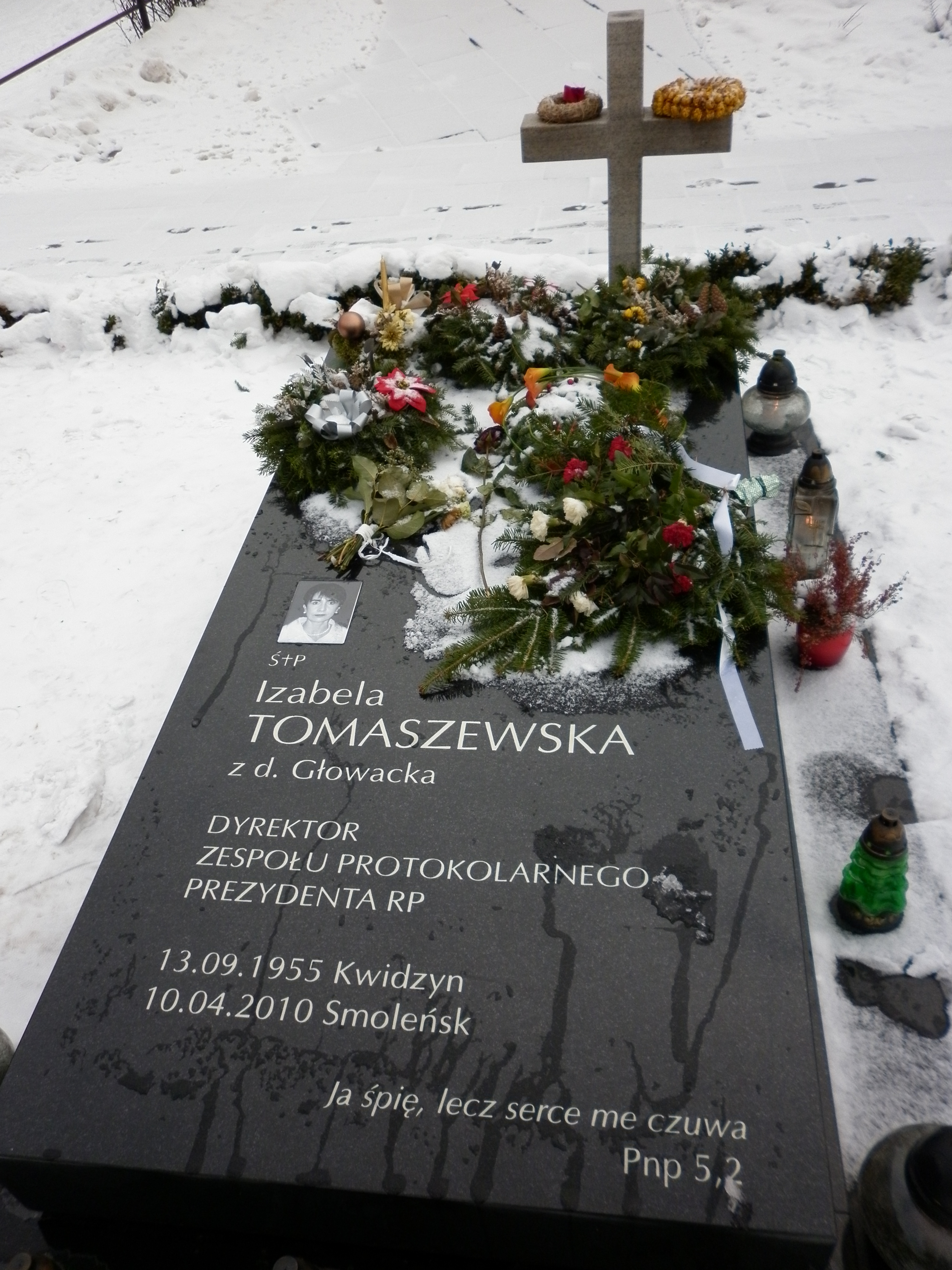
She is buried at the Powązki Military Cemetery

Izabela Tomaszewska, née Głowacka (13 September 1955 in Kwidzyn – 10 April 2010) was a high ranking Polish Protocol Director and archaeologist. She was head of the Protocol Unit at the Chancellery of the President of the Republic of Poland.

== Biography ==
Izabela was the daughter of Jadwiga Głowacka (née Antoszewska) and Bogdan Głowacki, a historian (doctor of historical sciences), in the years 1954–1970 a history teacher at the Pedagogical Secondary School A. Mickiewicza in Kwidzyn. As a high school student, she belonged to the Polish Scouting Association and participated twice in Operation 1001 Frombork, taking part in archaeological excavations. In 1974, she passed the Matura exam at the Secondary School in Kwidzyn, and on 19 April 1979, she graduated from the Institute of Archeology of the University of Warsaw, obtaining the professional title of Master of Arts in Archeology (the subject of her master's thesis: Late Latin Militaria). In the years 1979–1998 she worked as a research assistant at the Institute of Archeology and Ethnology of the Polish Academy of Sciences in Warsaw; conducted archaeological research in Mazovia (analysis of finds from the cemetery in Kołozębie in the Sochocin commune and excavations at the Słupno 6 site near the early medieval stronghold in Szeligi). In the 1980s and 1990s, she served as editorial secretary of the journals Archaeologia Polona (participating in the preparation for printing of volumes 25–28 in 1987–1990) and Archeologia Polski (co-editing volumes 35–43 in 1990–1998).

During the years 1998–2006, Tomaszewska was an employee of the Press Office of the President of Warsaw. In 2006, she started working at the Chancellery of the President of the Republic of Poland, where she became the director of the President's Protocol Team. In that capacity, she was first lady Maria Kaczyńska's closest collaborator, helping her organize conferences, interviews and social campaigns.

She died on 10 April 2010, along with Poland's president and first lady and 93 other people, in the Smolensk air disaster on the way to commemorate the 70th anniversary of the Katyn massacre. She is buried at the Powązki Military Cemetery.

On 19 April 2010, Tomaszewska was posthumously awarded the Order of Polonia Restituta.

== Personal life ==
In 1980, she married the archaeologist Andrzej Jacek Tomaszewski and they had a son, Filip, born in 1981. Their grandson was named Emil.
