= Edward Duchnowski =

Polish activist

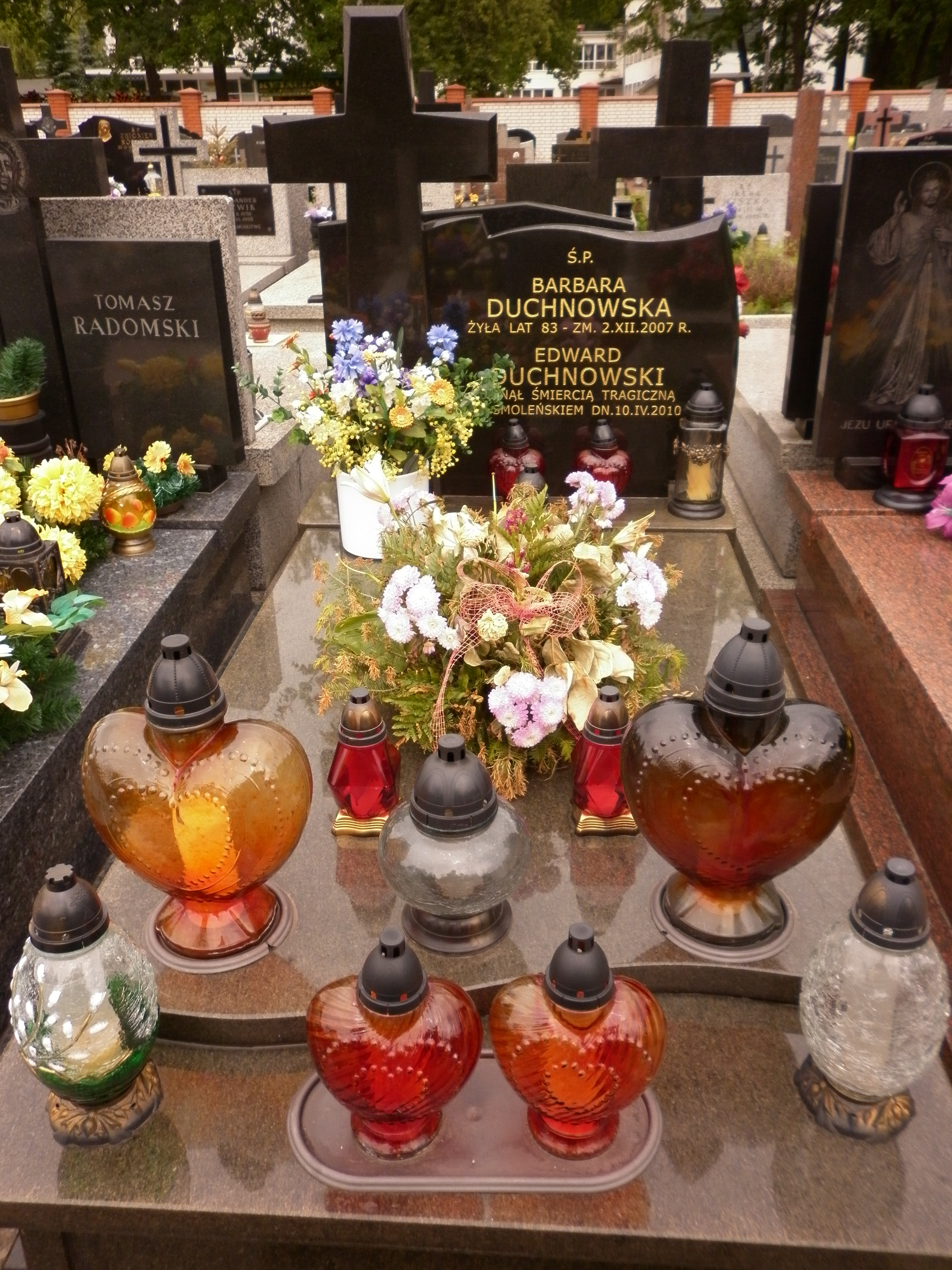
He is buried at the Marysin Wawerski Cemetery

Edward Duchnowski (16 January 1930 in Podbiele – 10 April 2010) was a Polish activist.

He died in the 2010 Polish Air Force Tu-154 crash near Smolensk on 10 April 2010. He was posthumously awarded the Order of Polonia Restituta.
