= Józef Joniec =

Polish Roman Catholic priest (1959-2010)

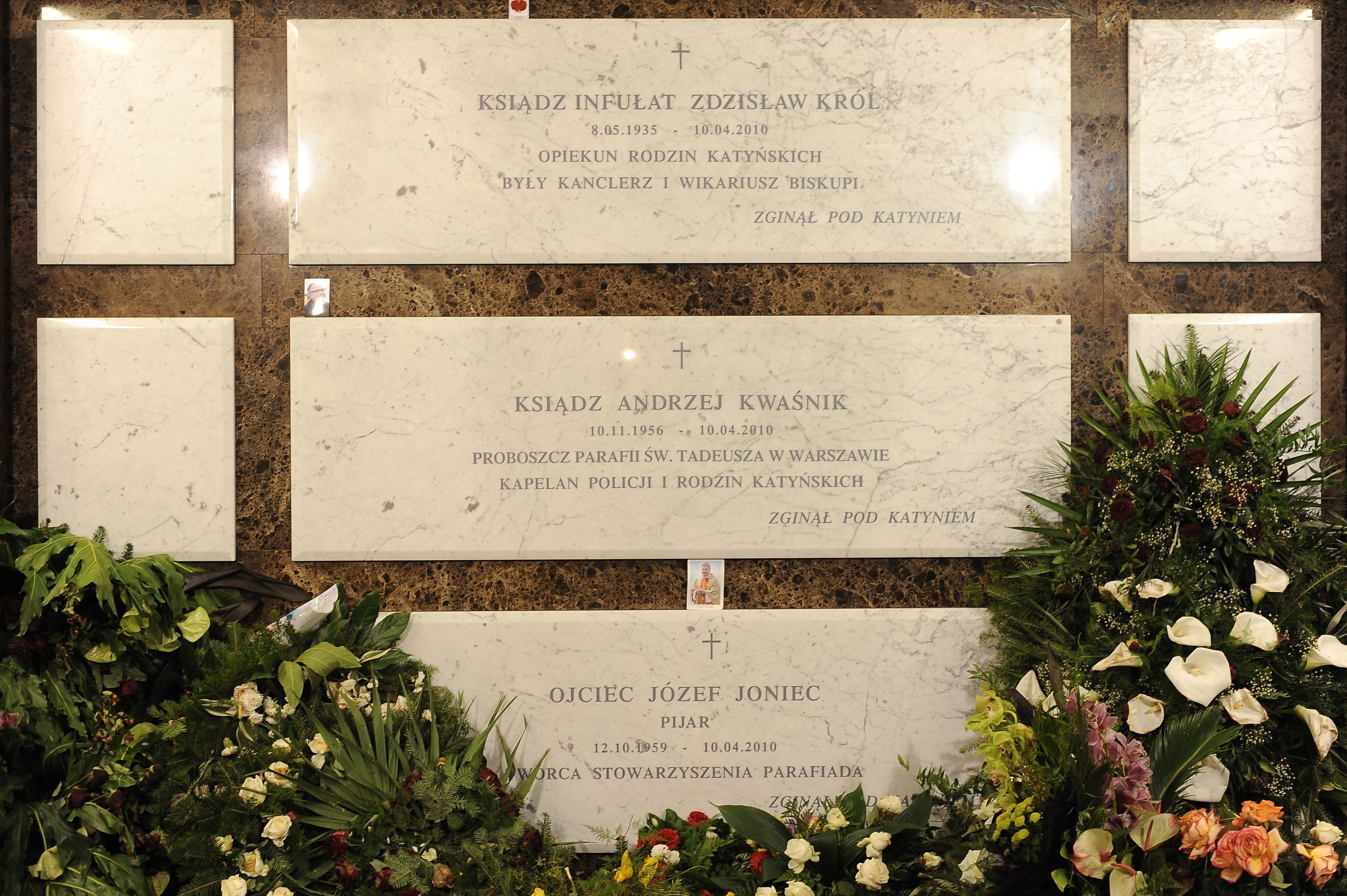
Panteon grave

Józef Joniec (12 October 1959 in Laskowa – 10 April 2010) was a Polish Roman Catholic priest.

== Biography ==
He made his first religious profession in the Piarist Order on August 16, 1977, accepting St. Krzysztof. He was ordained a priest on May 18, 1985, by Bishop Władysław Miziołek. After receiving ordination, he took up service in Kraków, Hebdów, and from 1990 in Warsaw as a rector of the Piarist College.

He died in the 2010 Polish Air Force Tu-154 crash near Smolensk on 10 April 2010. He was posthumously awarded the Order of Polonia Restituta.
