= Gabriela Zych =

Polish social activist (1941–2010)

- Born: 31 May 1941; Kalisz, Poland
- Died: 10 April 2010 (aged 68); Smolensk, Russia
- Cause of death: Smolensk air disaster
- Occupation: social activist
- Spouse: Leszek Zych
- Children: Przemysław Zych, Izabela Musielak
- Awards: Order of Polonia Restituta, Polish Cross of Merit

Gabriela Lucyna Zych (31 May 1941 – 10 April 2010) was a Polish social activist who (together with husband Leszek Zych) established the Katyn Families Association (Polish: Federacja Rodzin Katyńskich) and became its leader. She was behind the creation of the city's monument in memory of victims of the 1940 Katyn massacre. Zych was a victim of the Smolensk air disaster in April 2010.

== Biography ==
In Kalisz, Zych ran a laundry. She had a son, Przemysław, and a daughter, Izabela. Her husband was Leszek Zych (1928-2000), chair of the Kalisz Families Association in Katyn (Polish: Kaliska Rodzina Katyńska). His father, Captain Stefan Zych, had been murdered in the Katyn massacre in 1940.

After her husband's death, Gabriela Zych took over as the association's chair.

In 2005 she was awarded the Golden Cross of Merit.

Gabriela Zych died on 10 April 2010 in the Smolensk air disaster when travelling to the 70th annual commemoration of the Katyn massacre. She was travelling as a representative of the Katyn Families Association together with the rest of the Polish delegation. On 16 April 2010 she was posthumously awarded the Knight's Cross of the Order of Polonia Restituta. On 19 April 2010, she was buried with military honours in the cemetery of the parish of St Gotarda's Church in Kalisz. Soldiers from the 33rd Air Base in Powidz served as guards of honour.

In May 2010, at the crash site in Smolensk, after the area had been cleared by the Russian authorities, Gabriela Zych's passport was found among other items belonging to the victims. It was given to her family.

== Bibliography ==
- Stanisławczyk, Barbara (2011). Ostatni krzyk. Od Katynia do Smoleńska historie dramatów i miłości. Poznań: Dom Wydawniczy „Rebis”. ISBN 978-83-7510-814-9.
