= Katarzyna Piskorska =

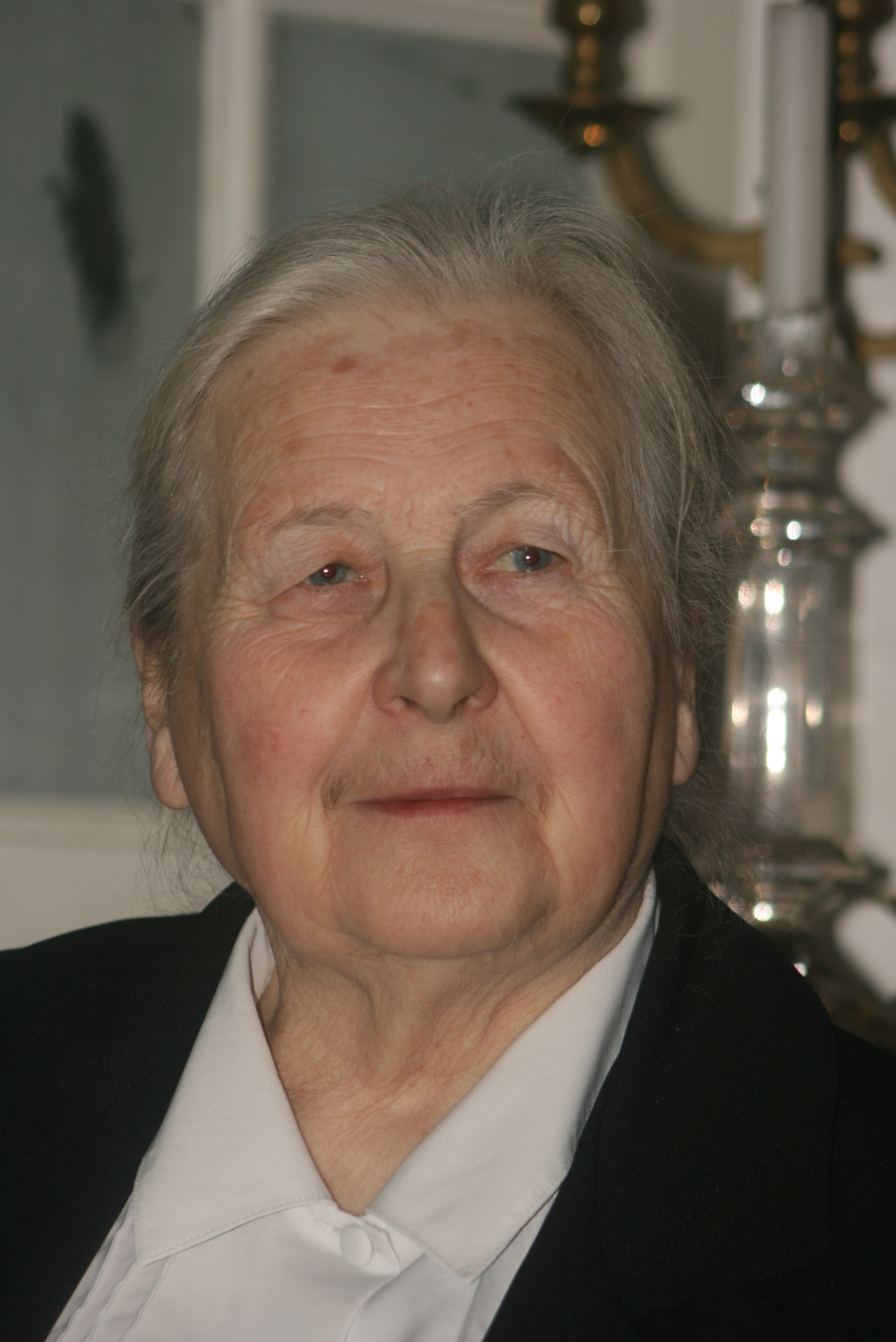
Katarzyna Piskorska

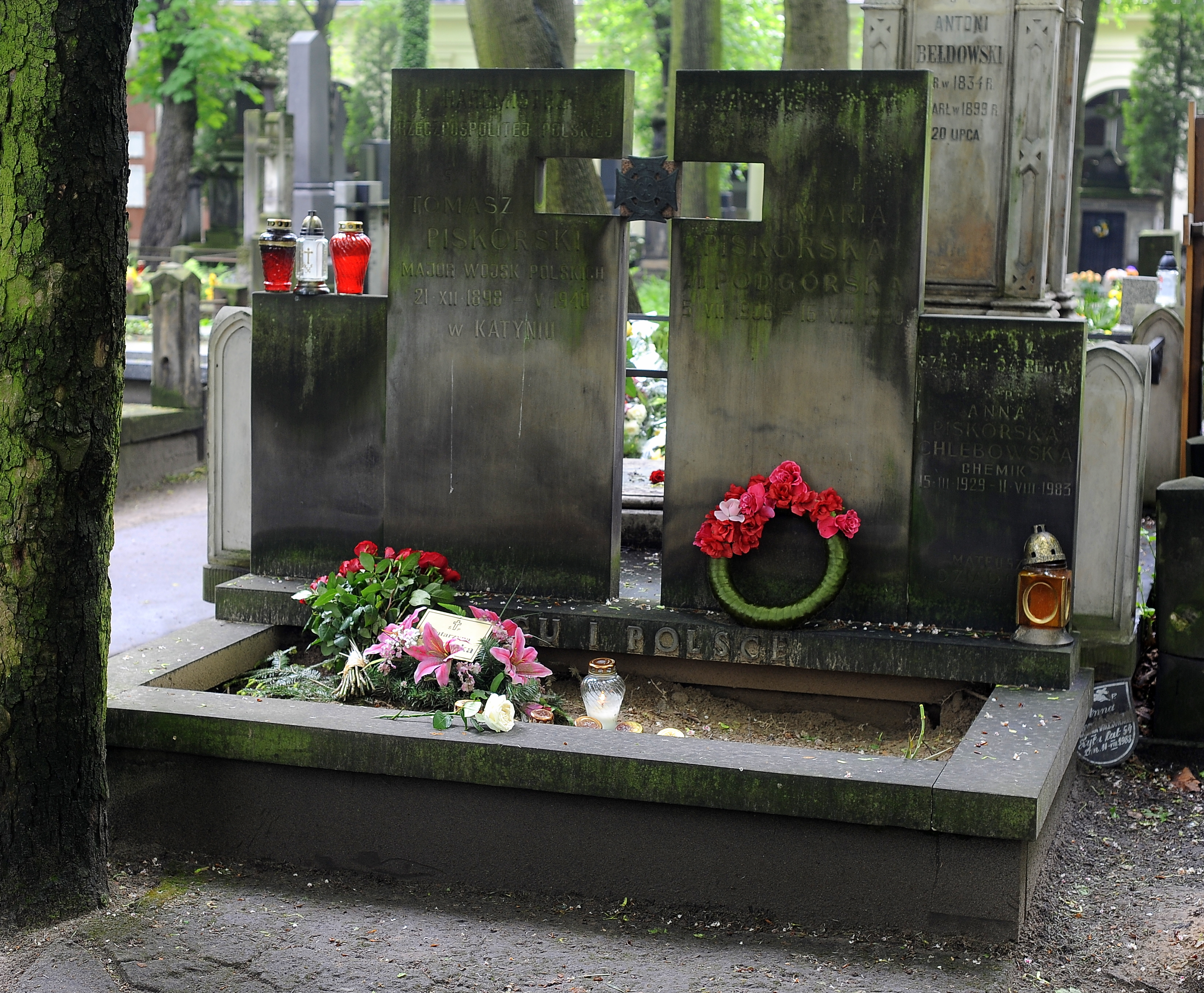
She is buried at the Powązki Cemetery

Katarzyna Piskorska (2 March 1937 – 10 April 2010) was a Polish sculptor.

She died in the 2010 Polish Air Force Tu-154 crash near Smolensk on 10 April 2010. She was posthumously awarded the Order of Polonia Restituta.
