= Jan Osiński =

Jan Kazimierz Osiński (24 March 1975 – 10 April 2010) was a Polish Roman Catholic priest. He was Vice-Chancellor of the Curia of the Military Ordinariate.

He died in the 2010 Polish Air Force Tu-154 crash near Smolensk on 10 April 2010. He was posthumously awarded the Order of Polonia Restituta.
