= Arkadiusz Protasiuk =

Polish pilot

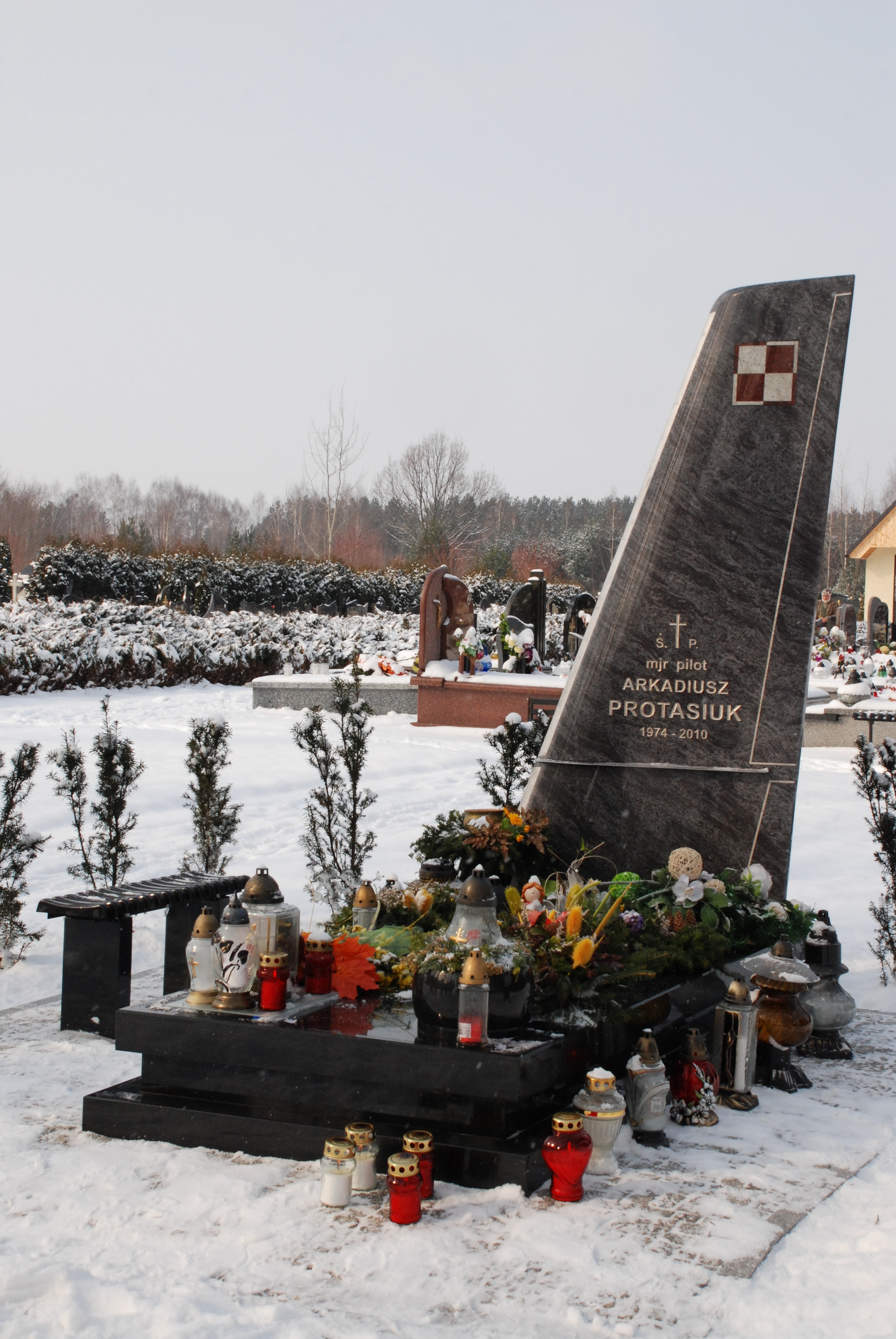
Arkadiusz Protasiuk is buried at the Grodzisk Mazowiecki Cemetery

Arkadiusz Protasiuk (13 November 1974 in Siedlce – 10 April 2010) was a Polish pilot, captain of the Polish Air Force Tu-154 flight to Smolensk on 10 April 2010.

He died in the 2010 Polish Air Force Tu-154 crash near Smolensk on 10 April 2010. He was posthumously awarded the Order of Polonia Restituta.

== Awards ==
- Bronze Medal of Merit for National Defence (2005)
- Bronze Cross of Merit (2007)
- Knights of the Order of Polonia Restituta (2010)
