= Barbara Mamińska =

Polish government official (1957–2010)

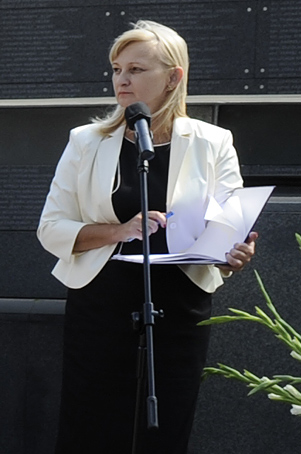
Barbara Mamińska

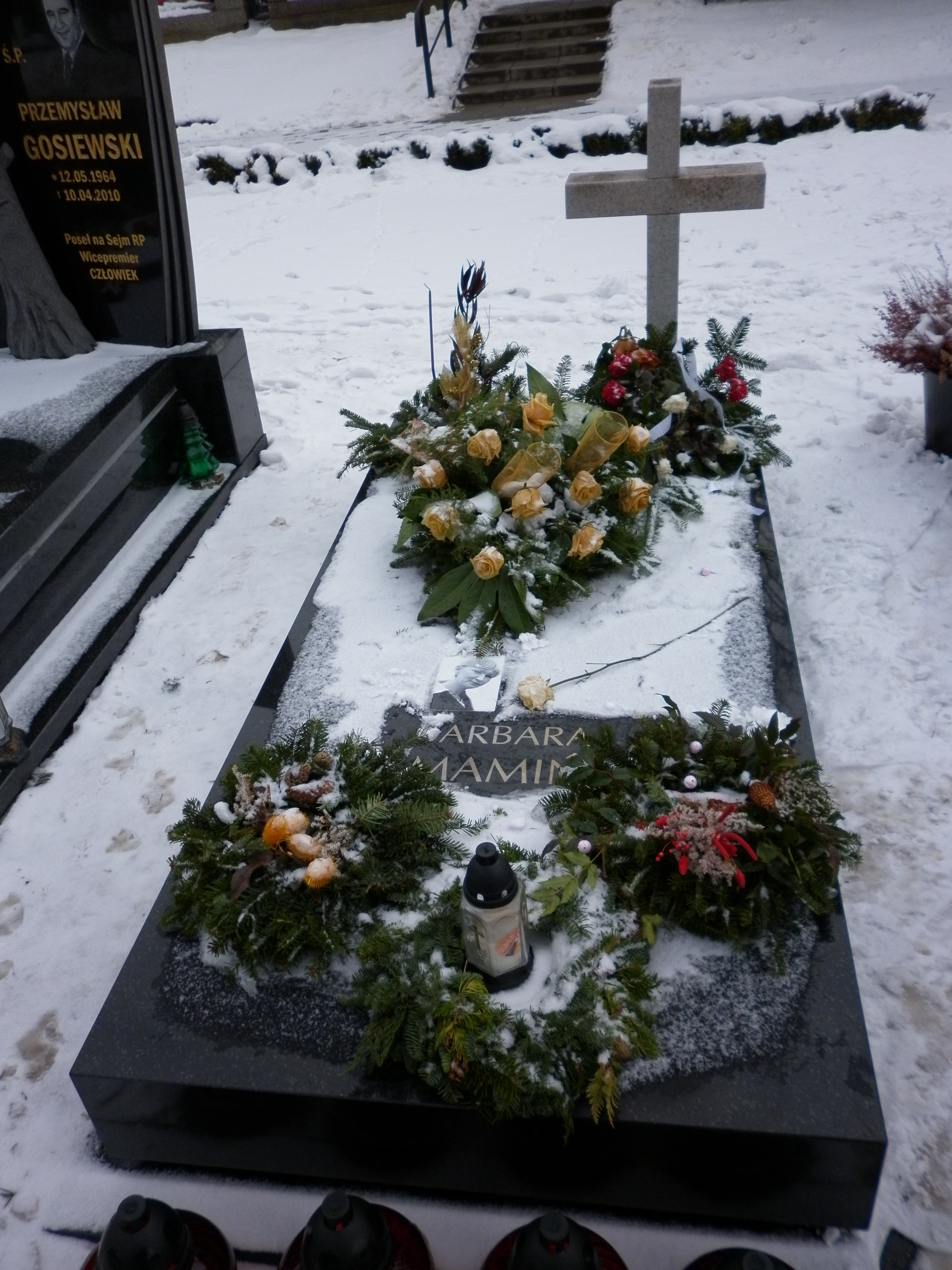
She is buried at the Powązki Military Cemetery

Barbara Mamińska (10 November 1957 – 10 April 2010) was a Polish government official. She was director of the Personnel and Decorations Office at the Chancellery of the President of the Republic of Poland.

She died in the 2010 Polish Air Force Tu-154 crash near Smolensk on 10 April 2010. She was posthumously awarded the Order of Polonia Restituta.
