= Andrzej Kremer =

Polish lawyer and diplomat

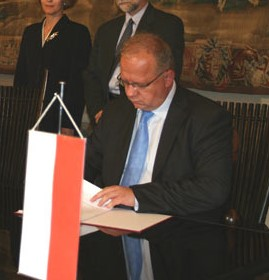
Andrzej Kremer

Andrzej Stanisław Kremer (8 August 1961 in Kraków – 10 April 2010) was a Polish lawyer and diplomat, the Deputy Minister of Foreign Affairs of Poland.

He was listed on the flight of the Tupolev Tu-154 of the 36th Special Aviation Regiment carrying the President of Poland Lech Kaczyński which crashed near Smolensk-North airport near Pechersk near Smolensk, Russia, on 10 April 2010, killing all aboard.

== Honours and awards ==
- Commander's Cross of the Order of Polonia Restituta – 2010, posthumously
- Bene Merito Badge of Honour – 2000, posthumously
- Chevalier of the Order of Merit, Stage III – 2009, Ukraine
