= Andrzej Sariusz-Skąpski =

Andrzej Sariusz-Skąpski (20 November 1937 – 10 April 2010) was a Polish activist. He was President of the Federation of Katyn Families, an interest that may have stemmed from his father's death there.

He died in the 2010 Polish Air Force Tu-154 crash near Smolensk on 10 April 2010. He was posthumously awarded the Order of Polonia Restituta.
