= Ryszard Rumianek =

Polish priest (1947–2010)

Ryszard Rumianek Prelate of Honour of His Holiness
- Rector of Cardinal Stefan Wyszyński University in Warsaw
- In office: 2005–2010

Orders
- Ordination: 1972 by Stefan Wyszyński

Personal details
- Denomination: Catholicism
- Motto: Respice finem

Ryszard Rumianek (7 November 1947 – 10 April 2010) was the rector of Cardinal Stefan Wyszyński University in Warsaw. He died in the 2010 Polish Air Force Tu-154 crash in Smolensk.

Rumianek was born in Warsaw. He was ordained in 1972 by Cardinal Stefan Wyszyński shortly after graduation from the Major Metropolitan Seminary in Warsaw. At the time of his death he was the rector of Cardinal Stefan Wyszyński University in Warsaw.

On 5 October 2009, for outstanding achievements in scientific and educational activities for performance in pastoral work he was awarded the Officer's Cross of the Order of Polonia Restituta. On 16 April 2010, he was posthumously awarded the Commander's Cross of Polonia Restituta.
