= Czesław Cywiński =

Polish Army officer (1926-2010)

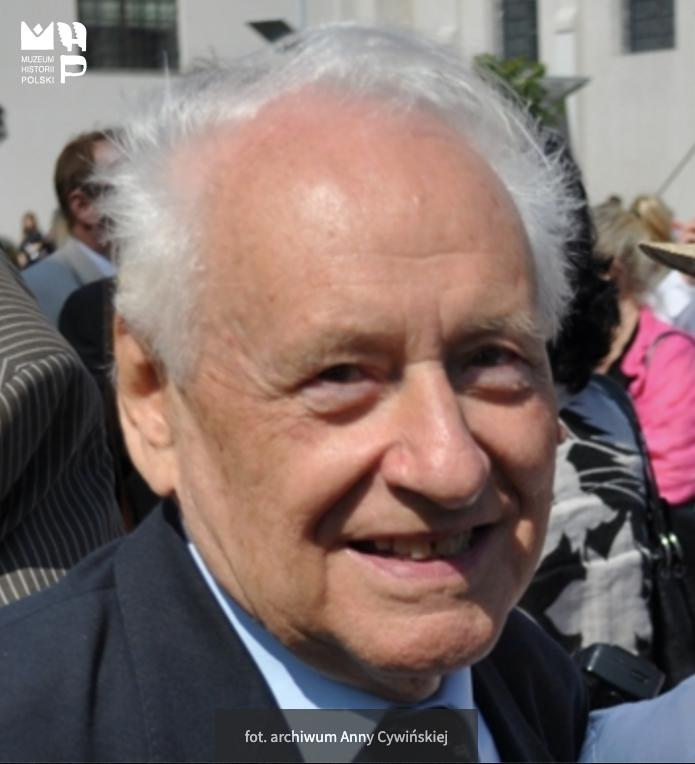
- Born: 10 March 1926; Wilno, Poland
- Died: 10 April 2010 (aged 84) near Smolensk, Russia
- Rank: Lieutenant Colonel (posthumously promoted to colonel)
- Conflicts: World War II
- Awards: Polonia Restituta 1st Class (posthum.); Cross of Valour; Silver Cross of Merit; Partisan Cross; Gold Medal for Merit for Country Defense

Czesław Justyn Cywiński (10 March 1926 – 10 April 2010) was the President of the Association of Armia Krajowa Soldiers. He was among those killed in the 2010 Polish Air Force Tu-154 crash.

== Honours and awards ==
Polonia Restituta 1st Class (posthum.)
Polonia Restituta 2nd Class
Polonia Restituta 3rd Class
Polonia Restituta 5th Class
Cross of Valour
Silver Cross of Merit
Partisan Cross
Gold Medal for Merit for Country Defense
