= Bronisława Orawiec-Löffler =

Polish activist and dentist

- Born: Bronisława Orawiec; 16 February 1929; Poronin, Poland
- Died: 10 April 2010 (aged 81) near Smolensk, Russia
- Education: AM w Krakowie
- Occupation: Dentist

Bronisława Orawiec-Löffler (16 February 1929 in Poronin – 10 April 2010) was a Polish activist and dentist.

She died in the 2010 Polish Air Force Tu-154 crash near Smolensk on 10 April 2010. She was posthumously awarded the Order of Polonia Restituta.
