= Stefan Melak =

Polish activist and journalist

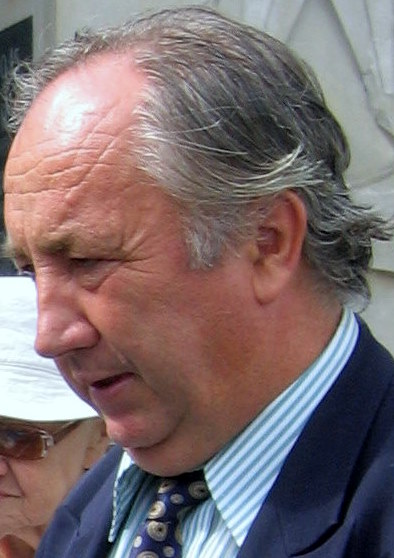
Stefan Melak

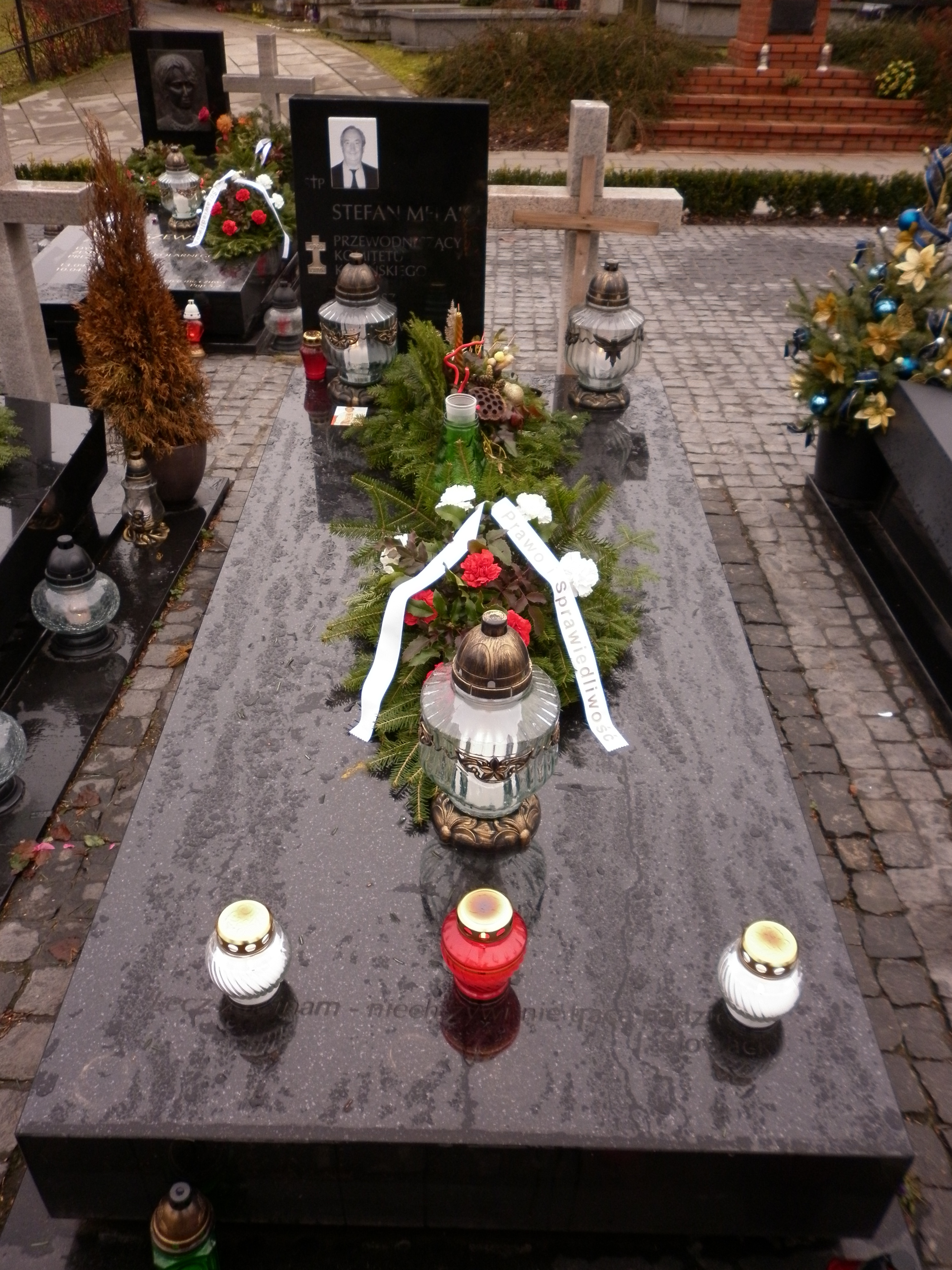
He is buried at the Powązki Military Cemetery

Stefan Melak (13 August 1946 – 10 April 2010) was a Polish activist and journalist. He was head of the Katyn Committee.

He died in the 2010 Polish Air Force Tu-154 crash near Smolensk on 10 April 2010. He was posthumously awarded the Order of Polonia Restituta.
