= Janina Natusiewicz-Mirer =

Polish activist (1940–2010)

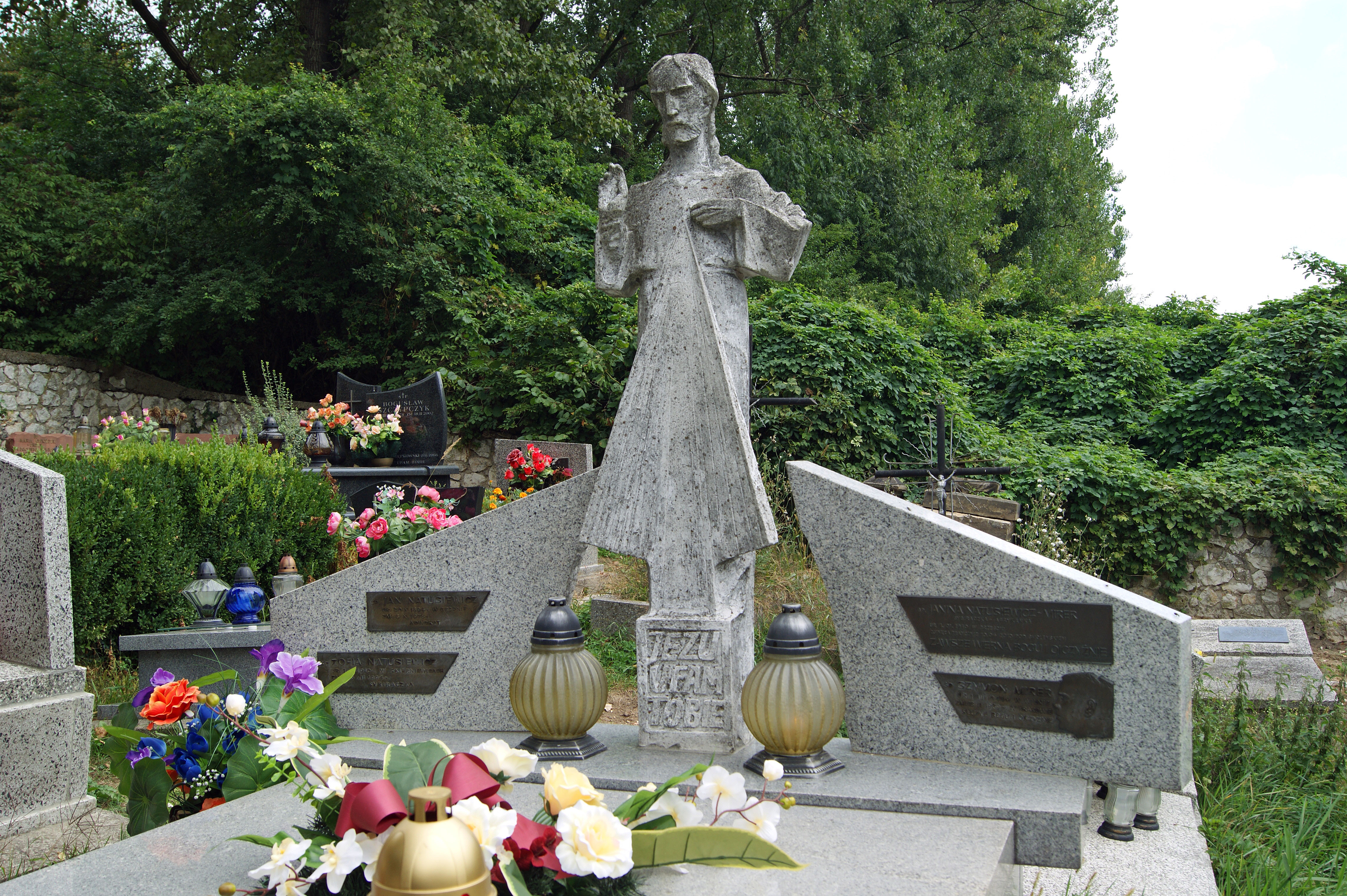
She is buried at the Tyniec Parish Cemetery

Janina Natusiewicz-Mirer (1 January 1940 – 10 April 2010) was a Polish activist.

She died in the 2010 Polish Air Force Tu-154 crash near Smolensk on 10 April 2010. She was posthumously awarded the Order of Polonia Restituta.
