= Tomasz Merta =

Polish historian

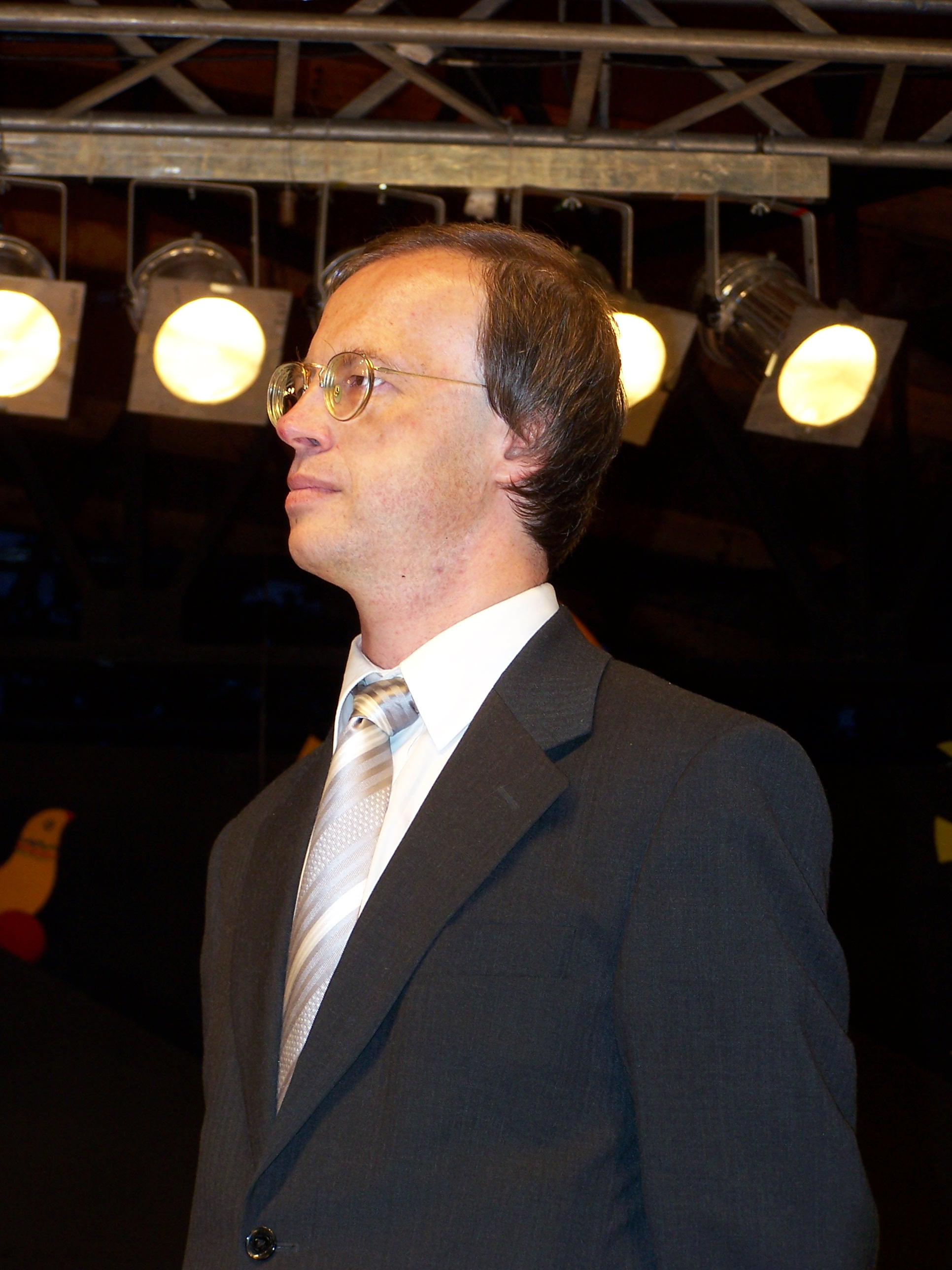
Tomasz Merta

Tomasz Adam Merta (7 November 1965, Legnica – 10 April 2010, Smolensk) was a Polish historian and Polish Undersecretary of State from 2005 to 2010. He served as the Polish Deputy Minister of Culture and National Heritage.

Merta was listed on the flight manifest of the Tupolev Tu-154 of the 36th Special Aviation Regiment, which was carrying the President of Poland Lech Kaczyński, and crashed near Smolensk-North airport near Smolensk, Russia, on 10 April 2010, killing all aboard. On April 16, 2010, he was posthumously decorated with the Commander's Cross with Star of the Order of Polonia Restituta, and also posthumously with the Gloria Artis Gold Medal of the National Education Commission. On the same day the Parliament of the province of Lower Silesia gave him the title of Honorary Citizen of Lower Silesia. He was buried in the cemetery at St. Sophie Barat in Warsaw
