= Teresa Walewska-Przyjałkowska =

Polish scientist and social activist

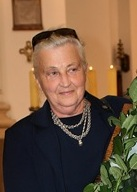
Teresa Walewska-Przyjałkowska

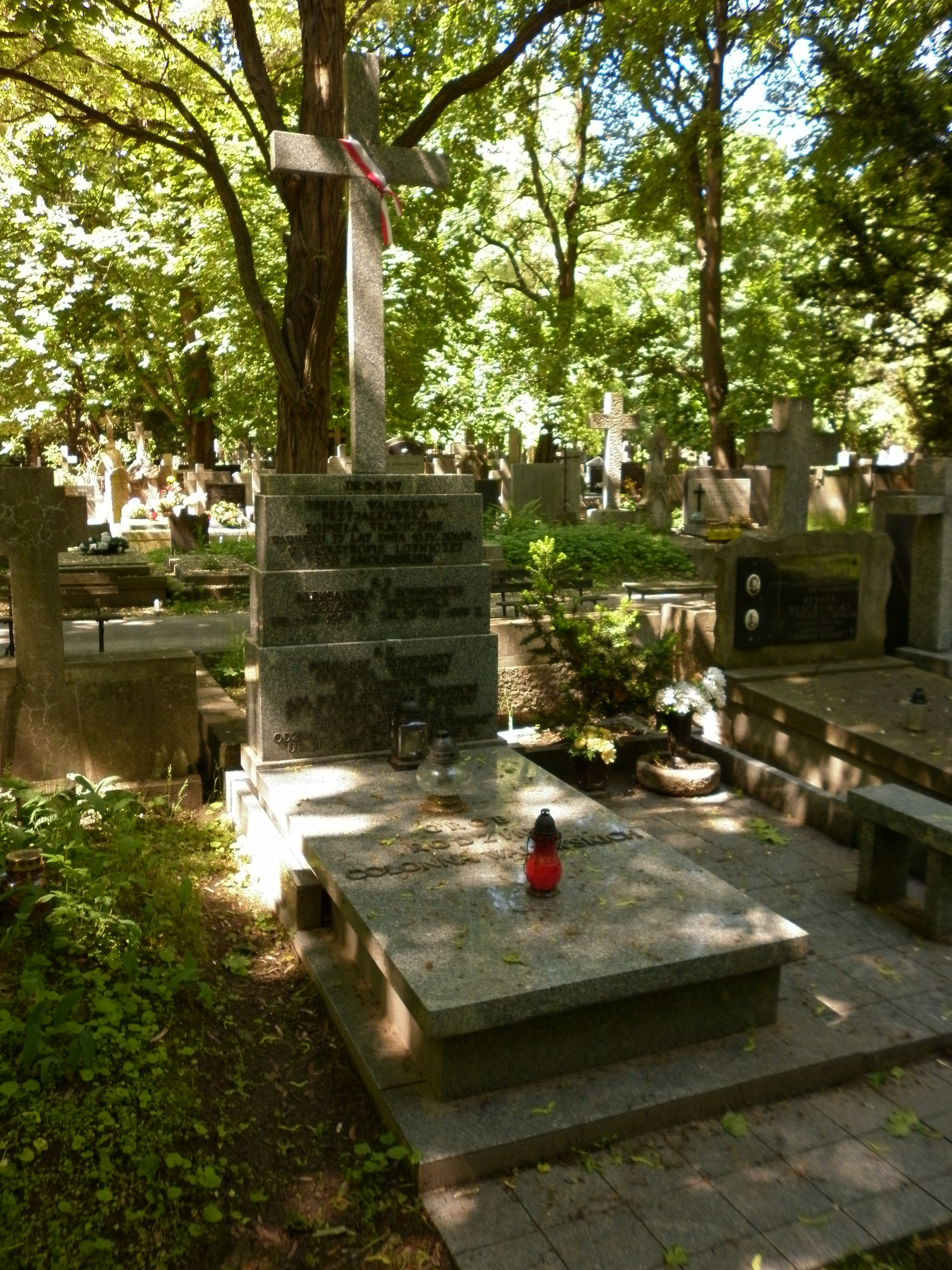
She is buried at the Powązki Cemetery

Teresa Walewska-Przyjałkowska (10 September 1937 – 10 April 2010) was a Polish scientist and social activist, founding member and vice-president of the Golgota Wschodu (Golgotha of the East), an organisation which commemorates the victims of the Katyn massacre. She was founder and president of the Association for the Propagation of the Cult of St. Andrew Bobola Foundation. She died in the 2010 Polish Air Force Tu-154 crash near Smolensk on 10 April 2010 and was posthumously awarded the Order of Polonia Restituta.

== Early life and education ==
Teresa Maria Barbara Walewska-Przyjałkowska was born on 10 September 1937. Her parents were Aleksandra, née Rosińska (1905-1989) and Polikarp Konstanty Collona Walewski (1897-1965, an aviation engineer). As a child she lived in Warsaw during the German occupation and survived the Warsaw Uprising. Her husband was Andrzej Przyjałkowski (d. 1978).

== Career ==
Teresa Walewska-Przyałkowska was a long-time employee of the Faculty of Automobiles and Robotic Machines at the Warsaw University of Technology. She held a doctoral degree in engineering and specialised in industrial automation and robotics. As part of her academic work, she developed a communication system related to control on marshalling hills for goods trains, and in the 1960s she was the first to organise research on them in her department.

== Religious convictions ==
She was associated with the Warsaw parish of St Andrew Bobola in Warsaw-Mokotów. In the early 1990s she founded, and from 1997 was president of the Association for the Propagation of the Cult of St Andrew Bobola, She organised pilgrimages tracing in his footsteps. On her initiative, in 2002, the image of Our Lady of Kozielsk, painted on the basis of a bas-relief made in the NKVD camp in Kozielsk, was enthroned in the sanctuary of St Andrzej Bobola at Rakowiecka Street in Warsaw. In 2003, this painting was consecrated by Pope John Paul II.

== Golgota Wschodu (Golgotha of the East) ==
Through her activities in church life, she got to know Father Zdzisław Peszkowski, with whom she was active in the Golgota Wschodu (Golgotha of the East) foundation, and she initiated the establishment of a committee seeking to submit his candidature for the Nobel Peace Prize.

In 2006, she was head of the organising committee of the international conference "Truth, Remembrance, Identity of Katyn and the Golgotha of the East", which took place on 28 September 2006 in the building of the Polish parliament. After the death of the president, Father Peszkowski, in 2007, she headed the Golgota Wschodu foundation, but out of respect for the late chaplain of the Katyn families she did not formally accept the title of president and functioned as vice-president. She organised meetings and scientific conferences devoted to the Katyn massacre.

== Death and recognition ==
Teresa Walewska-Przyałkowska died on 10 April 2010 in the Smolensk air disaster, travelling with the Polish delegation to the celebrations of the 70th anniversary of the Katyn massacre as a representative of the Katyn Families. On 16 April she was posthumously awarded the Knight's Cross of the Order of Rebirth of Poland. On 22 April 2010, after a mass in the sanctuary of St. Andrew Bobola in Warsaw, her funeral took place at the Powązki cemetery in the capital.

On 18 September 2012, on the orders of the District Military Prosecutor's Office in Warsaw investigating the Smolensk catastrophe, the body which had been buried in the grave of Teresa Walewska-Przyałkowska in the Powązki Cemetery in Warsaw was exhumed. On 25 September, the prosecution announced that her body had been accidentally switched with that of Anna Walentynowicz who also died in the air crash and had erroneously been buried in the latter's grave. On 2 October 2012, a second funeral was held for Teresa Walewska-Przyjałkowska. After a mass in the St. Karol Boromeusz Church, her body, previously buried in the Srebrzysko cemetery in Gdańsk-Wrzeszcz, was buried in a family tomb in the Powązki cemetery (section 305-5-17/18).
