= Leszek Solski =

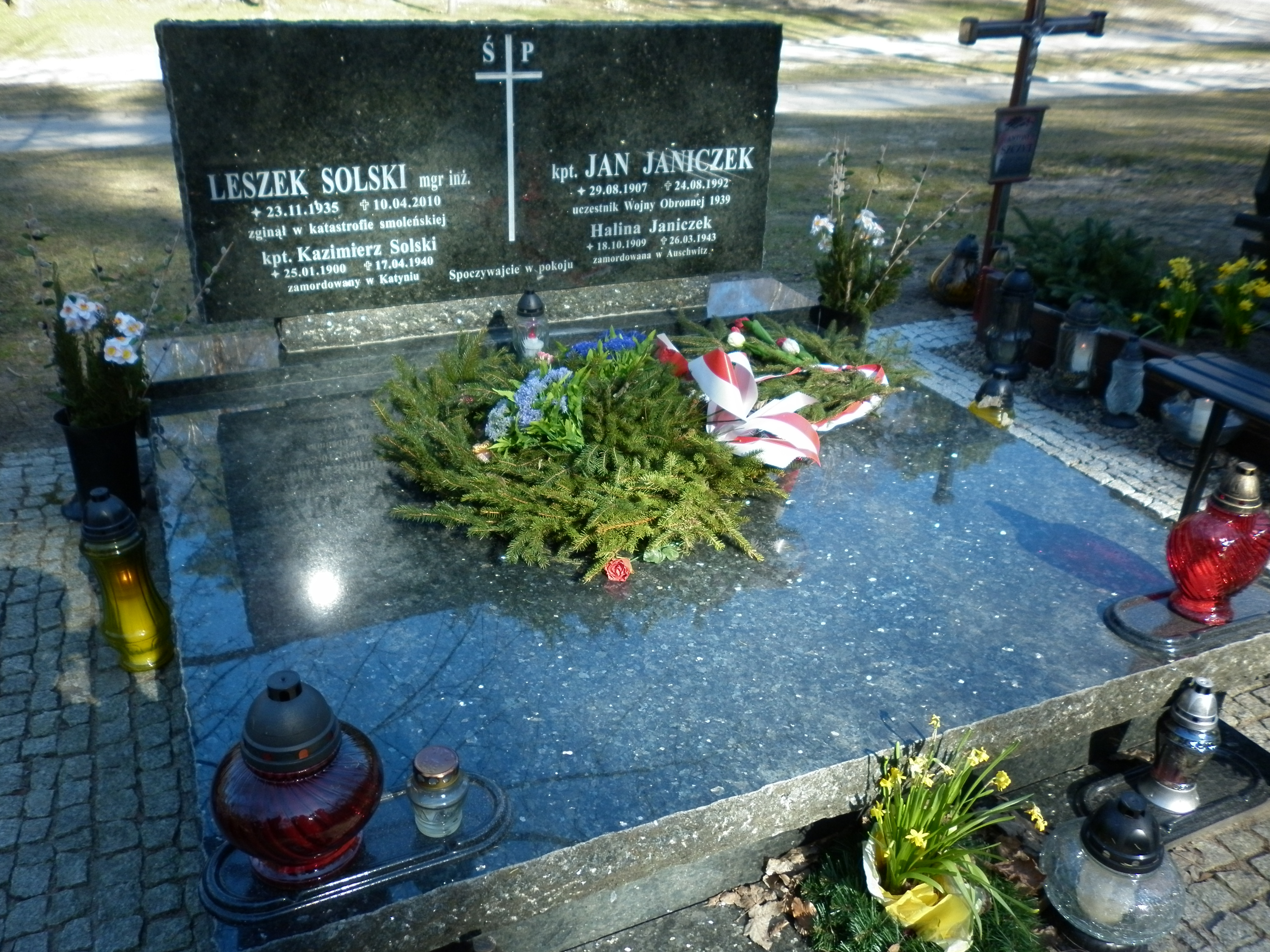
He is buried at the Srebrzysko Cemetery

Leszek Solski (23 November 1935 – 10 April 2010) was a Polish activist. He was a representative of the Katyn Families, a Polish NGO that brings together activists from across the country to commemorate the victims of the Katyn massacre.

== Early life ==
His parents were Halina, née Kawecka and captain Kazimierz Solski (1900-1940), horse artillery officer in the ranks of the 9th Regiment of Mounted Artillery of the Nowogródzka Cavalry Brigade (he was, among others, an adjutant of general Władysław Anders). His father was arrested in 1939 by the NKVD, imprisoned in the camp in Kozelsk and on 17 April 1940, murdered in Katyn. His uncle, major Adam Solski, was with his father in the camp, and was murdered on 9 April 1940.

At the end of World War II he has been through the camps from Pruszków to Buchenwald, and then to the labor camp in Lehrte near Hanover, where he and his mother were freed thanks to the efforts of her brother-in-law. After returning to Poland, they lived in Toruń.
