= Anna Maria Borowska =

Polish activist (1928–2010)

Anna Maria Borowska (20 July 1928 in Luzhki, Wilno Voivodeship – 10 April 2010) was a Polish activist and representative of the Federation of Katyn Families.

She died in the 2010 Polish Air Force Tu-154 crash near Smolensk on 10 April 2010. She was posthumously awarded the Order of Polonia Restituta.

== Awards ==
- Gold Cross of Merit (2007)
- Knight's Cross of the Order of Polonia Restituta (2010)
