= Deaths in April 2010 =

The following is a list of notable deaths in April 2010.

Entries for each day are listed alphabetically by surname. A typical entry lists information in the following sequence:

- Name, age, country of citizenship at birth, subsequent country of citizenship (if applicable), reason for notability, cause of death (if known), and reference.

== April 2010 ==
=== 1 ===
- Morag Beaton, 83, Scottish-born Australian operatic soprano.
- Vito De Grisantis, 68, Italian Roman Catholic prelate, Bishop of Ugento-Santa Maria di Leuca (2000–2010).
- Anders Eklund, 52, Swedish boxer.
- John Forsythe, 92, American actor (Bachelor Father, Charlie's Angels, Dynasty), complications from pneumonia.
- Paul Fry, 45, British motorcycle speedway rider.
- Buddy Gorman, 88, American actor (Bowery Boys, Dead End Kids), natural causes.
- Julia Lang, 88, British actress, radio presenter.
- Yuri Maslyukov, 72, Russian politician, Vice Premier of Soviet Union (1988–1990) and Russia (1998–1999).
- Lek Nana, 85, Thai businessman and politician, heart failure.
- Ed Roberts, 68, American computer pioneer, pneumonia.
- Tzannis Tzannetakis, 82, Greek politician, Prime Minister (1989).

=== 2 ===
- Israr Ahmad, 69, Indian nuclear physicist.
- Butch Allison, 65, American football player.
- Roman Bannwart, 90, Swiss theologian and musician.
- Din Beramboi, 43, Malaysian comedian, actor and radio DJ, hemorrhagic dengue fever.
- Mike Cuellar, 72, Cuban Major League Baseball player, stomach cancer.
- Ashari Danudirdjo, 87, Indonesian Olympic sailor.
- Edward Bayda, 78, Canadian jurist, Chief Justice of Saskatchewan (1981–2006).
- Dávid Daróczi, 37, Hungarian journalist, suicide.
- David Halliday, 94, American physicist.
- Arne Høyer, 81, Danish Olympic bronze medal-winning (1960) sprint canoer.
- Chris Kanyon, 40, American professional wrestler (WCW, WWF), suicide by drug overdose.
- Per Lyngemark, 68, Danish Olympic gold medal-winning (1968) cyclist.
- Sonia McMahon, Lady McMahon, 77, Australian socialite, widow of former Prime Minister Sir William McMahon, cancer.
- Thomas J. Moyer, 70, American jurist, Chief Justice of the Ohio Supreme Court (1987–2010).
- Carolyn Rodgers, 69, American poet, cancer.
- William Soeryadjaya, 87, Indonesian businessman, founder of Astra International.
- Frances Claudia Wright, 91, Sierra Leonean barrister.
- Mike Zwerin, 79, American jazz musician and jazz critic, after long illness.

=== 3 ===
- Romano Alquati, 75, Italian sociologist, political theorist and activist.
- Crosaire, 92, Irish-born Zimbabwean compiler of the Irish Times crossword since 1943.
- Buza Ferraz, 59, Brazilian actor, cardiac arrest.
- Oleg Kopayev, 72, Russian footballer, Soviet Top League top scorer (1963, 1965).
- Roland MacLeod, 74, British actor (Coronation Street, The Fall and Rise of Reginald Perrin).
- Ian McKay, 87, Australian footballer.
- Craig Noel, 94, American theatre producer, director and administrator of the Old Globe Theatre, natural causes.
- Jim Pagliaroni, 72, American baseball player (Boston Red Sox, Oakland Athletics), cancer.
- Ferdinand Simoneit, 84, German journalist, author and World War II veteran.
- Eugène Terre'Blanche, 69, South African white separatist leader, beating.
- Jesús Vásquez, 89, Peruvian singer.
- Yasunori Watanabe, 35, Japanese rugby player, hit by train.

=== 4 ===
- Mahmoud Abdel-Aal, 81, Egyptian gymnast.
- Lajos Bálint, 80, Hungarian-born Romanian Roman Catholic prelate, archbishop of Alba Iulia (1990–1993).
- Sir Alec Bedser, 91, English cricketer.
- Matt Cook, 22, Canadian ice sledge hockey player, bone cancer.
- Clifford M. Hardin, 94, American politician, Secretary of Agriculture (1969–1971), natural causes.
- Salomón Jaar, 48, bishop of Tamarindo Ward in Choluteca Honduras Stake.
- Rudy Kousbroek, 80, Dutch essayist.
- Lori Martin, 62, American actor (Cape Fear, National Velvet), suicide by gunshot.
- Kelly Moran, 49, American motorcycle speedway racer, complications from emphysema.
- Abubakar Rimi, 70, Nigerian politician.
- Shio Satō, 59, Japanese manga artist, brain tumor.
- Henry Scarpelli, 79, American comic book artist (Archie), after long illness.
- Friedrich Wilhelm Schäfke, 87, German mathematician and academic.
- Erich Zenger, 70, German Roman Catholic theologian and Bible scholar.

=== 5 ===
- Jim Edwards, 83, New Zealand politician.
- Jerry Elliott, 73, American jurist, Kansas Court of Appeals (since 1987), cancer.
- Lothar Engelhardt, 70, German military scientist.
- Günther C. Kirchberger, 81, German academic and painter.
- William Neill, 88, British poet.
- Helen Ranney, 89, American hematologist.
- Molefi Sefularo, 52, South African politician, traffic collision.
- Vitaly Sevastyanov, 74, Russian Soviet cosmonaut.
- Gisela Trowe, 86, German actress.

=== 6 ===
- Janet Adelman, 69, American literary critic.
- James Aubrey, 62, British actor (Lord of the Flies, Bouquet of Barbed Wire, Spy Game), pancreatitis.
- Eddie Carroll, 76, Canadian voice actor (Jiminy Cricket).
- Vinnie Chas, 47, American bassist (Pretty Boy Floyd).
- Anatoly Dobrynin, 90, Russian diplomat and politician, Soviet Ambassador to the United States (1962–1986).
- Jack Flannery, 57, American off-road racer, cancer.
- Ricardo Lavié, 87, Argentine actor, after long illness.
- Guillermo Luca de Tena, 82, Spanish journalist.
- Tony MacGibbon, 85, New Zealand cricketer.
- Wilma Mankiller, 64, American activist, first female Principal Chief of the Cherokee Nation (1985–1995), pancreatic cancer.
- Katsumi Nishikawa, 91, Japanese film director, pneumonia.
- Grete Olsen, 98, Danish Olympic fencer.
- David Quayle, 73, British businessman (B&Q).
- Tom Ray, 90, American animator (Looney Tunes, Tom and Jerry, Animaniacs).
- Corin Redgrave, 70, British actor and political activist, after short illness.
- Hans Schröder, 79, German sculptor and painter.
- Herbert Spiro, 85, German-born American political scientist, United States Ambassador to Cameroon (1975–1977)
- Sid Storey, 90, English footballer.
- Dimitris Tsiogas, 54, Greek politician, member of Parliament (2001–2008), cancer.
- Luigi Waites, 82, American jazz drummer and vibraphonist.

=== 7 ===
- Christopher Cazenove, 64, English actor (Dynasty, A Knight's Tale, Zulu Dawn), sepsis.
- Dixieland Band, 30, American Thoroughbred racehorse, euthanized.
- Hermina Franks, 95, American baseball player (AAGPBL).
- Graciela, 94, Cuban singer, renal and pulmonary failure.
- Eddie Johnson, 89, American jazz musician, pneumonia.
- Takuya Kimura, 37, Japanese baseball player and coach, subarachnoid hemorrhage.
- Oscar Kramer, 74, Argentine film producer, after long illness.
- Chris Limahelu, 59, American football place kicker (USC), prostate cancer.
- J. Bruce Llewellyn, 82, American businessman and activist, a founder of 100 Black Men of America, renal failure.
- George Nissen, 96, American gymnast, co-inventor of the trampoline, pneumonia.
- Betty Paraskevas, 81, American writer and lyricist, pancreatic cancer.
- Ramchandra Siras, 62, Indian linguist and author.
- Valentin Turchin, 79, Russian-born American computer scientist and human rights activist.

=== 8 ===
- Babá, 75, Brazilian footballer.
- Mark Colville, 4th Viscount Colville of Culross, 76, British judge and hereditary peer.
- Willie Farrell, 81, Irish politician.
- Antony Flew, 87, British philosopher, after long illness.
- Guy Kewney, 63, British technology journalist (Personal Computer World), colorectal cancer.
- Aladár Kovácsi, 77, Hungarian modern pentathlete, Olympic gold medalist (Helsinki 1952).
- Andreas Kunze, 57, German actor, heart failure.
- Malcolm McLaren, 64, British musician and band manager (Sex Pistols, New York Dolls, Bow Wow Wow), mesothelioma.
- Abel Muzorewa, 84, Zimbabwean Methodist bishop and politician, Prime Minister of Zimbabwe Rhodesia (1979).
- Richard Olasz, 79, American politician, member of the Pennsylvania House of Representatives (1981–1998).
- Personal Ensign, 26, American Thoroughbred racehorse, Hall of Famer, natural causes.
- Al Prince, 67, American-born French Polynesian journalist and tourism expert, after long illness.
- Jean-Paul Proust, 70, Monégasque politician, Minister of State (2005–2010).
- John Schoenherr, 74, American illustrator, Caldecott Medal winner, chronic obstructive pulmonary disease.
- Teddy Scholten, 83, Dutch singer.

=== 9 ===
- Bob Franks, 58, American politician, member of the House of Representatives from New Jersey (1993–2001), cancer.
- Alastair Dowell, 89, Scottish cricketer.
- John Griffiths, 57, Welsh museum curator.
- Hisashi Inoue, 75, Japanese pacifist playwright, lung cancer.
- Meir Just, 101, Dutch rabbi, Chief Rabbi of the Netherlands.
- Robert Lau, 68, Malaysian politician, Deputy Minister for Transport, liver cancer.
- Gisela Karau, 78, German author, editor and columnist, after long illness.
- Dario Mangiarotti, 94, Italian fencer, Olympic gold (1952) and silver (1948, 1952) medalist.
- Kenneth McKellar, 82, Scottish singer, pancreatic cancer.
- Jacob O. Meyer, 75, American religious sect leader (Assemblies of Yahweh).
- Meinhardt Raabe, 94, American actor (The Wizard of Oz), heart attack.
- Peter Ramsbotham, 3rd Viscount Soulbury, 90, British diplomat and politician, Governor of Bermuda (1977–1980).
- Lou Ritter, 84, American politician, Mayor of Jacksonville, Florida (1965–1967), cancer.
- Guyford Stever, 93, American educator and science adviser, President of Carnegie Mellon University (1965–1972).
- Kerstin Thorvall, 84, Swedish author, illustrator and journalist, after long illness.
- Pierre Trottier, 85, Canadian novelist.
- Zoltán Varga, 65, Hungarian footballer.

=== 10 ===
- Dixie Carter, 70, American actress (Designing Women, Diff'rent Strokes, Family Law), endometrial cancer.
- Sudhir Dhagamwar, 59, Indian cricketer.
- Jim Eames, 92, British Lord Mayor of Birmingham (1974–1975).
- David Harvey, 73, British paediatrician.
- Arnold Kanter, 65, American diplomat, acute myelogenous leukemia.
- Charles Meade, 93, American pastor, founder of Meade Ministries.
- Arthur Mercante Sr., 90, American boxing referee.
- Hiro Muramoto, 43, Japanese news cameraman (Reuters), shot.
- Martin Ostwald, 88, German-born American classics scholar.
- Manfred Reichert, 69, German footballer, after long illness.
- Sir Gordon Shattock, 81, British politician, survivor of the Brighton hotel bombing.
- William Walker, 78, American opera singer.
- Notable Polish people killed in the Polish Air Force Tu-154 plane crash:
  - Joanna Agacka-Indecka, 45, attorney, President of the Bar Council (since 2007).
  - Ewa Bąkowska, 47, librarian and activist.
  - Andrzej Błasik, 47, general, Chief of the Air Force (since 2007).
  - Krystyna Bochenek, 56, senator, vice president of Senate.
  - Tadeusz Buk, 49, general, head of Land Forces.
  - Miron Chodakowski, 52, Orthodox prelate, archbishop of military ordinariate of Poland (since 1998).
  - Czesław Cywiński, 84, President of the Association of Armia Krajowa Soldiers.
  - Leszek Deptuła, 57, member of the Sejm.
  - Grzegorz Dolniak, 50, member of the Sejm.
  - Janina Fetlińska, 57, senator.
  - Franciszek Gągor, 58, general, Chief of the General Staff (since 2006).
  - Grażyna Gęsicka, 58, politician, Minister of Regional Development (2006–2007).
  - Kazimierz Gilarski, 54, Commander of the Warsaw Garrison.
  - Przemysław Gosiewski, 45, member of the Sejm, Deputy Prime Minister (2007).
  - Mariusz Handzlik, 44, diplomat, Undersecretary of State in the Office of the President.
  - Izabela Jaruga-Nowacka, 59, member of the Sejm, Deputy Prime Minister (2004–2005).
  - Ryszard Kaczorowski, 90, politician, President in exile (1989–1990).
  - Maria Kaczyńska, 67, First Lady of Poland (since 2005), wife of Lech Kaczyński.
  - Lech Kaczyński, 60, President of Poland (since 2005).
  - Sebastian Karpiniuk, 37, member of the Sejm.
  - Andrzej Karweta, 51, Vice Admiral, commander-in-chief of the Navy.
  - Mariusz Kazana, 49, diplomat, Director of Diplomatic Protocol in the Ministry of Foreign Affairs.
  - Janusz Kochanowski, 69, lawyer and diplomat, Commissioner for Civil Rights Protection (Ombudsman) (since 2006).
  - Stanisław Komornicki, 85, general, Chancellor of the Order Virtuti Militari.
  - Stanisław Komorowski, 56, Deputy Defense Minister (since 2007), Ambassador to Holland (1994–1998) and UK (1999–2004).
  - Andrzej Kremer, 48, lawyer and diplomat, Deputy Foreign Minister (since 2008).
  - Janusz Kurtyka, 49, historian, president of the Institute of National Remembrance.
  - Bronisław Kwiatkowski, 59, general, Commander of the Armed Forces Operational Command.
  - Tomasz Merta, 44, Deputy Minister of Culture and National Heritage.
  - Aleksandra Natalli-Świat, 51, member of the Sejm.
  - Piotr Nurowski, 64, sports administrator, head of the Polish Olympic Committee (since 2005).
  - Bronisława Orawiec-Löffler, 81, dentist and activist.
  - Maciej Płażyński, 52, member of the Sejm.
  - Tadeusz Płoski, 54, Roman Catholic prelate, Bishop of military ordinariate of Poland (since 2004).
  - Włodzimierz Potasiński, 53, Commander of the Special Forces.
  - Andrzej Przewoźnik, 46, Secretary-General of the Council for the Protection of Struggle and Martyrdom Sites.
  - Krzysztof Putra, 52, politician, Vice-Marshal of the Sejm (since 2007).
  - Ryszard Rumianek, 62, rector of the Cardinal Stefan Wyszyński University in Warsaw.
  - Arkadiusz Rybicki, 57, member of the Sejm.
  - Wojciech Seweryn, 70, Polish-born American sculptor.
  - Sławomir Skrzypek, 46, banker, President of National Bank of Poland.
  - Władysław Stasiak, 44, Chief of the Office of the President.
  - Aleksander Szczygło, 46, politician, Minister of Defence (2007), chief of the National Security Bureau (since 2009).
  - Jerzy Szmajdziński, 58, politician, Minister of Defence (2001–2005), Vice-Marshal of the Sejm (since 2007).
  - Jolanta Szymanek-Deresz, 55, member of the Sejm.
  - Anna Walentynowicz, 80, trade unionist whose 1980 firing led to the creation of the Solidarity movement.
  - Zbigniew Wassermann, 60, member of the Sejm.
  - Wiesław Woda, 63, member of the Sejm.
  - Edward Wojtas, 55, member of the Sejm.
  - Paweł Wypych, 42, politician, Secretary of State (since 2009).
  - Stanisław Zając, 60, senator.
  - Janusz Zakrzeński, 74, actor.

=== 11 ===
- George Roberts Andrews, 78, American diplomat.
- John Batchelor, 51, British racing driver and politician, liver disease.
- Jean Boiteux, 76, French swimmer, Olympic gold and bronze medalist (1952), fall from a tree.
- James Brody, 68, American composer, traffic collision.
- Rosa Roberto Carter, 80, Guamanian educator, president of the University of Guam (1977–1983).
- Vicki Draves, 85, American Olympic diver, pancreatic cancer.
- Gerhard Geise, 80, German mathematician, after long illness.
- Hans-Joachim Göring, 86, German footballer and coach.
- Gert Haller, 65, German business manager, lobbyist and politician, after long illness.
- Theodor Homann, 61, German footballer, heart failure.
- Egon Hugenschmidt, 84, German jurist and politician.
- Franz Kamin, 68, American composer, traffic collision.
- Alby Linton, 83, Australian footballer.
- John B. McCue, 88, American politician, Member of the Pennsylvania House of Representatives.
- Ruben Mendoza, 78, American soccer player, cerebral hemorrhage.
- Duane D. Pearsall, 88, American inventor of the battery-powered smoke detector.
- Julia Tsenova, 61, Bulgarian composer and musician, cancer.
- Paz Yrarrázabal, 78, Chilean actress, rheumatoid arthritis.

=== 12 ===
- Alper Balaban, 22, German-born Turkish footballer, traffic collision.
- María Aurelia Bisutti, 79, Argentine actress, dementia.
- Andrea Cassone, 81, Italian Roman Catholic prelate, archbishop of Rossano-Cariati (1992–2006).
- Michel Chartrand, 93, Canadian activist, kidney cancer.
- Miguel Cinches, 78, Filipino Roman Catholic prelate, bishop of Surigao (1973–2001).
- Ambrosius Eßer, 76, German Dominican clergy and church historian, pulmonary disease.
- Wolfgang Graßl, 40, German skier and coach, heart failure.
- Peter Haskell, 75, American actor (Child's Play 2).
- Edward Huni'ehu, 54, Solomon Islander politician and minister, after long illness.
- Běla Kolářová, 87, Czech photographer.
- James F. Masterson, 84, American psychiatrist, complications of pneumonia.
- Palito, 75, Filipino comedian, respiratory disease.
- Robert Pound, 90, Canadian-born American physicist.
- Stuart Robbins, 33, British basketball player.
- Werner Schroeter, 65, German film director, after long illness.
- Arnold Spohr, 86, Canadian artistic director (Royal Winnipeg Ballet), chronic kidney disease.
- David B. Stone, 82, American businessman, principal founder of the New England Aquarium, complications from a stroke.
- Dale N. Van Vyven, 74, American politician, member of the Ohio House of Representatives (1978–2000).
- Udaya Wickramasinghe, 70, Sri Lankan cricket umpire.

=== 13 ===
- André Bedoglouyan, 90, Lebanese Eastern Catholic prelate, bishop of Comana Armeniae (1971–1994).
- Alexander Bernstein, Baron Bernstein of Craigweil, 74, British television executive and life peer.
- Jorge Bontemps, 32, Argentine footballer, lung cancer.
- Luis Antonio Chávez, 22, Honduran journalist and children's radio host, shot.
- Billy Gore, 90, Welsh rugby player.
- Santhosh Jogi, 35, Indian actor, suicide by hanging.
- Bernie Kilgariff, 86, Australian politician, Senator (1975–1987).
- David C. Knapp, 82, American educator.
- Nahid al-Rayyis, 73, Palestinian politician and poet.
- Steve Reid, 66, American jazz drummer, throat cancer.
- Gerald Stapleton, 89, British airman, RAF fighter ace during World War II.
- Charlie Timmins, 87, English footballer (Coventry City), cancer.

=== 14 ===
- Israr Ahmed, 77, Indian-born Pakistani Islamic scholar, cardiac arrest.
- Binyamin Balanero, 68, Israeli footballer.
- Pittaya Boonyarattaphan, 76, Thai luk krung singer.
- René Brunelle, 90, Canadian politician.
- Erika Burkart, 88, Swiss author.
- Aubrey Cummings, 62, Guyanese musician, heart problems.
- Tom Ellis, 86, British politician, MP for Wrexham (1970–1983), founding member of the SDP.
- Vicente Haro, 79, Spanish actor.
- Gene Kiniski, 81, Canadian professional wrestler, cancer.
- Lars-Jacob Krogh, 71, Norwegian anchorman and television presenter, amyotrophic lateral sclerosis.
- Alice Miller, 87, Polish-born Swiss author and psychologist.
- Russell Olson, 86, American politician, Lieutenant Governor of Wisconsin (1979–1983).
- Baruch Poupko, 92, Russian-born American rabbi.
- Stefan Schmitt, 46, German jurist and politician, leukemia.
- Mississippi Slim, 66, American blues singer, heart attack.
- Greville Starkey, 70, British jockey, cancer.
- Peter Steele, 48, American rock singer and bassist (Type O Negative). https://www.petersteelerocks.com/bio 💚💚
- Albert S. Toe, 56, Liberian politician.
- Gerhard Zemann, 70, Austrian actor, heart attack.

=== 15 ===
- Telman Adigozalov, 56, Azerbaijani actor, heart attack.
- Joseph Azzolina, 84, American politician, member of the New Jersey General Assembly (1992–2006), pancreatic cancer.
- Ian Brewer, 73, Australian footballer.
- Robert Brubaker, 93, American actor (Gunsmoke).
- Bill DuBay, 62, American comic book editor, writer, and artist.
- Jack Herer, 70, American cannabis activist, complications from heart attack.
- Benjamin Hooks, 85, American civil rights leader, executive director of the NAACP (1977–1992), after long illness.
- Wilhelm Huxhorn, 54, German footballer, leukemia.
- Paul Reeves, 91, American Episcopal prelate, Bishop of Georgia (1969–1985)
- Michael Pataki, 72, American character actor and voice actor (George Liquor), cancer.
- Peter-Josef Schallberger, 78, Swiss farmer and politician.
- Raimondo Vianello, 87, Italian comedian and television personality.
- Spann Watson, 93, American airman (Tuskegee Airmen) and civil rights advocate.
- Sir Edward Woodward, 81, Australian jurist.

=== 16 ===
- Sid Conrad, 86, American actor (The Young and the Restless).
- Balthasar Burkhard, 65, Swiss photographer.
- Rasim Delić, 61, Bosnian army officer and Chief of Staff, probable heart attack.
- Shirlee Emmons, 86, American soprano, voice teacher, and writer.
- Ibrahima Fofana, 57, Guinean trade unionist, traffic collision.
- Carlos Franqui, 89, Cuban writer and activist.
- Daryl Gates, 83, American police official, chief of police of the Los Angeles Police Department (1978–1992), bladder cancer.
- Bryn Knowelden, 90, British rugby league player.
- Marion Ladewig, 95, American professional bowler.
- Norman Francis McFarland, 88, American Roman Catholic prelate, Bishop of Reno (1976–1986) and Orange (1986–1998).
- R. D. Middlebrook, 80, British electrical engineer.
- Grigorijs Ņemcovs, 61, Latvian politician, Vice Mayor of Daugavpils, shot.
- Muhammad Noer, 92, Indonesian politician, governor of East Java (1967–1976), complications during a medical procedure.
- C. K. Prahalad, 68, Indian business consultant and management theorist, natural causes.
- C. P. Rele, 82, Indian classical singer.
- Arturo Rodríguez Fernández, 62, Dominican author, film critic and playwright, heart failure.
- Tomáš Špidlík, 90, Czech Roman Catholic prelate and Cardinal.
- John W. Vogt Jr., 90, American Air Force general.

=== 17 ===
- Dede Allen, 86, American film editor (Bonnie and Clyde, Dog Day Afternoon, The Breakfast Club), BAFTA winner (1976), stroke.
- Abdul Rahman Ahmed Jibril Baroud, 73, Palestinian poet, heart attack.
- Edmund Fitzgibbon, 85, Irish-born Nigerian Roman Catholic prelate, Bishop of Warri (1991–1997).
- Josef W. Janker, 87, German author, journalist and World War II veteran.
- Ferenc Kellner, 77, Hungarian Olympic boxer.
- Sotigui Kouyaté, 74, Malian-born Burkinabé actor.
- Carl Macek, 58, American anime writer and producer (Robotech), heart attack.
- Thomas Mikolajcik, 63, American air force general (1992–1996), amyotrophic lateral sclerosis.
- Alexandru Neagu, 61, Romanian footballer (FC Rapid București).
- Alejandro Robaina, 91, Cuban tobacco grower, cancer.
- John Carl Warnecke, 91, American architect (John F. Kennedy Eternal Flame), complications of pancreatic cancer.

=== 18 ===
- Michael Adams, 60, American actor and stunt coordinator (Commando, WarGames, In the Line of Fire), stroke.
- Abu Omar al-Baghdadi, 50-51, Iraqi terrorist (al-Qaeda), airstrike.
- Abu Ayyub al-Masri, 42-43, Egyptian terrorist (al-Qaeda), airstrike.
- William Grant Bangerter, 91, American Mormon leader, President of the Church of Jesus Christ of Latter-day Saints.
- Paul Bisciglia, 81, French actor.
- Julius Chigbolu, 81, Nigerian Olympic athlete.
- Mieczysław Cieślar, 60, Polish Lutheran bishop, traffic collision.
- Ambrose D'Mello, 87, Indian Jesuit priest, first Jesuit Provincial of India, cancer.
- Tom Fleming, 82, Scottish actor.
- John Forde, Irish Gaelic footballer (Mayo).
- Noel Hall, 96, Australian Olympic sport shooter.
- Ian McTaggart-Cowan, 99, Scottish-born Canadian zoologist and ecologist.
- Ron Miller, 80, Canadian Olympic athlete.
- Allen Swift, 86, American voice actor (Underdog, Howdy Doody, Tom and Jerry ), natural causes.
- Viewed, 6, Australian Thoroughbred racehorse, euthanised following a twisted bowel.
- William Yates, 88, British-born Australian politician.

=== 19 ===
- Manfred Angerer, 56, Austrian musicologist.
- José Bernal, 85, Cuban artist, complications from Parkinson's disease.
- Devorah Bertonov, 95, Israeli dancer and choreographer.
- William Donald Borders, 96, American Roman Catholic prelate, archbishop of Baltimore (1974–1989).
- Guru, 48, American rapper (Gang Starr), multiple myeloma.
- Hamideh Kheirabadi, 85, Iranian actress, stroke.
- Dylan Meier, 26, American college football player, climbing accident.
- György Schwajda, 67, Hungarian dramatist and theatre director, after long illness.
- George H. Scithers, 80, American science fiction editor, Hugo Award winner, heart attack.
- Albert Szatola, 83, Hungarian Olympic equestrian.
- Edwin Valero, 28, Venezuelan undefeated former WBA super featherweight and WBC lightweight champion boxer, suicide by hanging.
- Carl Williams, 39, Australian criminal, prison assault.
- Burkhard Ziese, 66, German football manager.

=== 20 ===
- Jimmy Baker, 95, Australian Aboriginal artist.
- Floyd Dominy, 100, American public servant, commissioner of the Bureau of Reclamation (1959–1969).
- Sanford Friedman, 81, American novelist.
- Heinz Gappmayr, 84, Austrian artist.
- Dorothy Height, 98, American civil rights activist.
- M. K. Kamalam, 86, Indian actress.
- Keli McGregor, 47, American baseball executive (Colorado Rockies), viral myocarditis.
- Walter F. Murphy, 80, American political scientist and author, cancer.
- Robert Natkin, 79, American abstract painter, bacterial blood infection.
- Georgino Orellana, 48, Honduran journalist, shot.
- Ahmad Sa'd, 64, Israeli politician, Member of Knesset (1996–1999).
- George Torode, 63, Guernseyan author.
- Andrea West, 57, Australian politician, member of the House of Representatives (1996–1998), breast cancer.
- Myles Wilder, 77, American television comedy writer, diverticulitis.
- Lorette Wood, 94, American politician, first female mayor of Santa Cruz, California (1971–1972).
- Purvis Young, 67, American painter, cardiac arrest and pulmonary edema.

=== 21 ===
- Akua Asabea Ayisi, 83, Ghanaian journalist.
- Sammy Baird, 79, Scottish football player and manager.
- Krishan Lal Balmiki, 67, Indian politician.
- Whitney Robson Harris, 97, American lawyer, last surviving American prosecutor at the Nuremberg Trials, complications from cancer.
- Tony Ingham, 85, English footballer, after short illness.
- Manfred Kallenbach, 68, German footballer, heart failure.
- Gustav Lorentzen, 62, Norwegian singer and entertainer (Knutsen & Ludvigsen).
- Mr. Hito, 67, Japanese wrestler.
- Sir Laurence Muir, 85, Australian philanthropist and businessman.
- Sir Idwal Pugh, 92, British civil servant, Permanent Secretary to the Welsh Office and Health Service Commissioner.
- Deborah Remington, 79, American artist, cancer.
- Juan Antonio Samaranch, 89, Spanish Olympic official, president of the International Olympic Committee (1980–2001), heart failure.

=== 22 ===
- Sparky Adams, 79, American football and baseball coach.
- Theodore C. Almquist, 68, American general, colon cancer.
- Emilio Álvarez, 71, Uruguayan footballer.
- Richard Barrett, 67, American lawyer and white nationalist, stabbed.
- Pete Castiglione, 89, American baseball player (Pittsburgh Pirates).
- Peter B. Denyer, 56, British engineer, cancer.
- Dick Kenworthy, 69, American baseball player.
- Gene Lees, 82, Canadian jazz historian and critic, heart disease.
- Lina Marulanda, 29, Colombian model, suicide by jumping.
- Victor Nurenberg, 79, Luxembourgish footballer.
- Ambrose Olsen, 25, American fashion model, suicide by hanging.
- Fred Panopio, 71, Filipino folk singer, cardiac arrest.
- Alicia Parlette, 28, American journalist and copy editor, alveolar soft part sarcoma.
- Piet Steenbergen, 81, Dutch footballer (Feyenoord and The Netherlands).
- Jean Vergnes, 88, French-born American chef.
- Arthur Winograd, 90, American cellist and music director, complications of pneumonia.

=== 23 ===
- Lorne Atkinson, 88, Canadian Olympic cyclist.
- Jan Balabán, 49, Czech writer, recipient of the Magnesia Litera award.
- Shay Duffin, 79, Irish-born American actor (The Departed, Leprechaun, Seabiscuit), complications from heart surgery.
- Natalia Lavrova, 25, Russian rhythmic gymnast, Olympic gold medalist (2000, 2004), traffic collision.
- Georgia Lee, 89, Australian jazz and blues singer.
- Edward Lyons, 83, British politician, MP for Bradford East (1966–1974) and Bradford West (1974–1983).
- Peter Porter, 81, Australian-born British poet, liver cancer.
- Alan Rich, 85, American classical music critic, natural causes.
- Alexander Sliussarev, 65, Russian photographer and translator.
- Sreenath, 52, Indian actor, apparent suicide by exsanguination.
- George Townshend, 7th Marquess Townshend, 93, British peer and businessman.

=== 24 ===
- Jens Andersen, 80, Danish boxer.
- Harry Ashby, 63, English golfer.
- Harry Conroy, 67, British journalist and trade unionist.
- Denis Guedj, 70, French novelist and academic.
- Pierre Hadot, 88, French philosopher.
- Bo Hansson, 67, Swedish keyboardist.
- Leo Löwenstein, 43, German VLN racing driver, race crash.
- Angus Maddison, 84, British economist.
- Giuseppe Panza, 87, Italian art collector.
- Elizabeth Post, 89, American etiquette expert.
- Paul Schäfer, 88, German religious sect founder and former Nazi, heart failure.
- Wojciech Siemion, 81, Polish actor and film director (The Promised Land, Heroism), traffic collision.
- Rudy Thompson, 80, United States Virgin Islands Olympic sailor.
- W. Willard Wirtz, 98, American politician, Secretary of Labor (1962–1969), last surviving member of the Kennedy Cabinet.

=== 25 ===
- Ali Aliu, 85, Kosovo Albanian writer, economist, teacher, and political prisoner.
- Ugo Anzile, 79, French cyclist.
- Joseph Bessala, 69, Cameroonian welterweight boxer, Olympic silver medalist (1968), after short illness.
- Ian Lawther, 70, Northern Irish footballer (Sunderland, Blackburn Rovers).
- Franklin Mieuli, 89, American businessman, owner of the Golden State Warriors (1962–1985), natural causes.
- Dorothy Provine, 75, American actress, (It's a Mad, Mad, Mad, Mad World, That Darn Cat!, The Great Race), emphysema.
- Susan Reed, 84, American folk singer and actress, natural causes.
- Kevin Restani, 58, American basketball player (Milwaukee Bucks), heart attack.
- Volf Roitman, 79, Uruguayan-born American sculptor, painter, novelist, cineaste and poet.
- Evry Schatzman, 89, French astrophysicist.
- Alan Sillitoe, 82, British writer (Saturday Night and Sunday Morning).
- Jeremaia Waqanisau, 62, Fijian soldier and diplomat, heart attack.

=== 26 ===
- Mariam A. Aleem, 79, Egyptian artist.
- Aminulrasyid Amzah, 14, Malaysian student and victim, shot.
- Roy Baird, 76, English production manager, assistant director and producer.
- Bus Boyk, 92, American fiddler.
- Leslie Buck, 87, American Anthora coffee cup designer, Parkinson's disease.
- Ljiljana Buttler, 65, Yugoslavian singer, cancer.
- Daniel of Erie, 79, American Orthodox prelate (ROCOR), Titular Bishop of Erie, natural causes.
- Paul Engo, 89, Cameroonian diplomat, judge and Olympic athlete.
- Denzil Freeth, 85, British politician, MP for Basingstoke (1955–1964).
- Luigi Gui, 95, Italian politician, Minister of the Interior (1974–1976).
- Fred Halliday, 64, Irish academic, scholar of international relations, cancer.
- Derek Hayward, 86, British Anglican priest, Archdeacon of Middlesex (1974–1975).
- Frank Olsson, 87, Swedish Olympic rower.
- Varkala Radhakrishnan, 82, Indian politician, complications from a traffic collision.
- Prabha Rau, 75, Indian politician, Governor of Rajasthan (since 2009), heart attack.
- Joseph W. Sarno, 89, American film director and screenwriter, after short illness.
- Alberto Vitoria, 54, Spanish footballer, heart attack.
- Yuri Vshivtsev, 70, Russian footballer.
- William Arthur Watts, 79, Irish botanist and academic administrator, Provost of Trinity College Dublin (1981–1991).
- Aksel C. Wiin-Nielsen, 86, Danish academic, professor of meteorology.

=== 27 ===
- Elisabeth Ahlgren, 84, Swedish swimmer.
- Robert J. Alexander, 91, American academic.
- David Martin Baker, 86, American politician and judge, member of the West Virginia House of Delegates (1953–1954, 1957–1958).
- Alberta Cariño, Mexican humanitarian, shot.
- Peter Cheeseman, 78, British theatre director, Parkinson's disease.
- Stanley Greenspan, 68, American academic, clinical professor of psychiatry.
- George Gross, 69, American football player (San Diego Chargers).
- Jyri Jaakkola, 33, Finnish humanitarian, shot.
- Tanie Kitabayashi, 98, Japanese actress (My Neighbour Totoro), pneumonia.
- Bevil Mabey, 94, British businessman.
- Morris Pert, 62, British musician.
- Nossrat Peseschkian, 76, Iranian-born German psychotherapist.
- Armando Sanchez, 57, Filipino politician, governor of Batangas (2004–2007), stroke.
- Heini Weber, 86, German Olympic wrestler.

=== 28 ===
- Muhammad al-Banki, 47, Bahraini philosopher and writer.
- Evelyn Cunningham, 94, American journalist, natural causes.
- Julio San Emeterio, 80, Spanish cyclist.
- Stefania Grodzieńska, 95, Polish writer and actress.
- Elma Maua, 61, Cook Islands-born New Zealand journalist and editor, after long illness.
- Pierre-Jean Rémy, 73, French writer and diplomat.
- Furio Scarpelli, 90, Italian screenwriter (Big Deal on Madonna Street, Casanova 70, Il Postino).
- Ian Valz, 52, Guyanese actor and playwright, cancer.

=== 29 ===
- Jojo Acuin, 63, Filipino psychic.
- Avigdor Arikha, 81, Romanian-born Israeli painter, complications of cancer.
- Damodar Chaudhary, 63, Nepalese politician, member of the Constituent Assembly since 2007.
- Sandy Douglas, 88, British computer scientist, pneumonia.
- Kevin Humphreys, 80, Australian rugby league administrator, after long illness.
- Walter Sear, 79, American recording engineer.
- Audrey Williamson, 83, British athlete, Olympic silver medalist (1948).

=== 30 ===
- Manuel Alvarado, 62, Guatemalan-born British academic.
- Tadahiro Ando, 69, Japanese politician, governor of Miyazaki Prefecture (2003–2006), lymphoma.
- Robert Askins, 91, American murderer.
- Cristina Corrales, 47, Bolivian journalist, broadcaster and politician.
- Harry Eccleston, 87, British artist and banknote designer.
- Jordi Estadella, 61, Spanish voice actor, radio and television personality (Un, dos, tres... responda otra vez), liver cancer.
- Ron Fimrite, 79, American sports journalist (Sports Illustrated), pancreatic cancer.
- José Fragelli, 95, Brazilian politician, governor of Mato Grosso (1970–1974) and Senate president (1985–1987).
- Carmelita González, 81, Mexican actress, pneumonia.
- Antony Grey, 82, British gay rights activist, leukaemia.
- Khalid Khawaja, Pakistani military and intelligence officer, shot. (body found on this date)
- Paul Mayer, 98, German Roman Catholic prelate and cardinal.
- Owsley, 44, American musician, apparent suicide.
- Jorma Peltonen, 66, Finnish ice hockey player.
- Gwyn Rowlands, 81, English-born rugby football player for Wales.
- Gerry Ryan, 53, Irish disc jockey and radio/television presenter.
- Wendell J. Westcott, 99, American carillonneur.
