= 2010 in Switzerland =

- Decades: 1990s; 2000s; 2010s; 2020s
- See also: History of Switzerland; Timeline of Swiss history; List of years in Switzerland

Events in the year 2010 in Switzerland.

== Incumbents ==
- President of the Swiss Confederation: Doris Leuthard
- President of the National Council: Jean-René Germanier
- President of the Swiss Council of States: Hansheiri Inderkum

== Events ==
- 6 January: Extreme weather across Europe leads to dozens of deaths, including at least 7 as a result of an avalanche in Switzerland.
- 4 February: Switzerland agrees to accept two Chinese Muslim Uyghurs from the Guantanamo Bay detention camp.
- 25 February: Libyan leader Muammar al-Gaddafi calls for jihad against Switzerland after a referendum last year supported a ban on minarets and other rows between the two nations.
- 7 February: Voters in Switzerland take part in a referendum on whether to provide lawyers for non-human animals and other issues.
- 19 March: Switzerland ceases to deport asylum seekers in response to the death of a Nigerian man at Zürich Airport as he was being forcefully deported. Nigeria condemns the occurrence.
- 10 June: Max Goeldi, the Swiss businessman at the centre of a long-running diplomatic row between Libya and Switzerland, is released from prison in Tripoli.
- 14 June: The Federal Supreme Court of Switzerland rules that Romanian footballer Adrian Mutu has lost his final appeal in a five-year legal battle meaning he has to pay a record €17 million in damages for breaching his contract.
- 12 July: Switzerland rejects a request from the United States to extradite Franco–Polish film director Roman Polanski to face sentencing on charges of unlawful sex with a minor in 1977.
- 3–11 December – The 2010 European Curling Championships take place in Champéry.
- 5 December: Bank officials attempt to shut down an account opened by Julian Assange in Switzerland.

== Arts and entertainment ==
- 63rd Locarno Film Festival

== Sports ==
- 15 February: 2010 Winter Olympics in Vancouver: Dario Cologna secures Switzerland's first ever Olympic cross-country gold medal and Norway delivers its poorest ever cross-country Olympic performance in the men's 15km freestyle cross-country competition

== Deaths ==
- 8 January – Raymond Kamber, 79, Olympic sprint canoer.
- 17 February – Roger-Émile Aubry, 86, Swiss-born Bolivian Roman Catholic prelate, Vicar Apostolic of Reyes (1973–1999).
- 25 February – Ernst Beyeler, 88, art collector.
- 26 February – Charles le Gai Eaton, 89, Swiss-born British diplomat and author.
- 27 February – Roger Veeser, 90, Olympic athlete.
- 2 April – Roman Bannwart, 90, theologian and musician.
- 14 April:
  - Erika Burkart, 88, author.
  - Alice Miller, 87, Polish-born Swiss author and psychologist.
- 15 April – Peter-Josef Schallberger, 78, farmer and politician.
- 16 April – Balthasar Burkhard, 65, photographer.
- 15 May – Loris Kessel, 60, racing driver.
- 18 May:
  - Iskender Alptekin, 48, politician
  - Karin Iten, 53, figure skater.
- 2 June – Marguerite Narbel, 92, biologist and politician, member of the Grand Council of Vaud.
- 28 June – Nicolas Hayek, 82, entrepreneur, founder and chairman of The Swatch Group.
- 8 July – Robert Freitag, 94, Austrian-born Swiss actor.
- 19 July – Antoinette Meyer, 90, Olympic silver medal-winning (1948) alpine skier.
- 11 August – Markus Liebherr, 62, businessman, owner of Southampton F.C.
- 15 September – Peter Stebler, 83, Olympic silver medal-winning (1948) rower.
- 21 September – Bernard Genoud, 68, Roman Catholic prelate, Bishop of Lausanne, Genève et Fribourg (1999–2010).
- 5 October – Steve Lee, 47, musician (Gotthard).
- 22 October – René Villiger, 79, painter.
- 25 October – Hans Arnold, 85, Swiss-born Swedish artist.
- 31 October – Max Barandun, 68, Olympic sprinter.
- 10 November – Georges Aeschlimann, 90, cyclist.
- 3 December – Hugues Cuénod, 108, tenor.
- 11 December:
  - Roger Nicole, 95, Swiss-born American Evangelical Christian theologian.
  - Peter Risi, 60, footballer.
- 27 December – Walter Balmer, 62, footballer.
