= Corrales =

Corrales may refer to:

== People ==
- Corrales (surname)

== Places ==
- Corrales, New Mexico
- Corrales, Boyacá, Colombia
- Corrales de Duero, municipality in the province of Valladolid, Castile and León, Spain
- Corrales del Vino, municipality in the province of Zamora, Castile and León, Spain
- Los Corrales, municipality in the province of Seville, Andalusia, Spain
- Los Corrales de Buelna, municipality in the autonomous community of Cantabria, Spain
- Corrales, Aguadilla, Puerto Rico, a barrio
