= 2010 in radio =

The following events occurred in radio in 2010.

== Events ==
- January - Radio Mashaal is launched; the new station is a member of Radio Free Europe in Pakistan, broadcasting in the Pashto language. It was launched in January 2010.
- March - Indian radio station Radio City launches its first internet station, Radio City Fun Ka Antenna.

== Debuts ==
- Andar ng mga Balita, weekday news bulletin on Radyo5 92.3 News FM in Mega Manila, Philippines, anchored by Martin Andanar. Ran until 2012.
- Breakfast with Hector, breakfast radio programme on RTÉ 2fm in Ireland, presented by Hector Ó hEochagáin. Ran until 2013.
- Day 6, Canadian Saturday morning show on CBC Radio One, hosted by Brent Bambury.
- S.R.O., radio talk show on DZMM in the Philippines
- The Breakfast Club, American radio show debuts in New York.
- 103.5 Wow FM (now 103.5 K Lite) begins broadcast in Pasig, Philippines.

== Closings ==
- Key Net Radio, Japanese Internet radio programme (begun 2007)
- Lørdagsbarnetimen (Saturday Children's Hour), the world's longest-running regular weekly radio series, having begun in 1924.
- MMDA Radio was cease operations due to broken transmitting tower.

== Deaths ==
- 31 January - Thorleif Karlsen, Norwegian police inspector, politician and radio host, 100
- 19 February - Bull Verweij, Dutch businessman, co-founder of Radio Veronica, 100
- 30 April - Cristina Corrales, Bolivian journalist, radio broadcaster, and politician, 47
- 14 June - Richard Herrmann, Norwegian journalist, writer and radio personality (NRK), 90
- 8 July - Lelio Luttazzi, Italian composer, actor, television and radio presenter, 87
- 21 August - Hugo Guerrero Marthineitz, Peruvian journalist, commentator and radio host, 86
- 20 September - Fud Leclerc, musician and singer, four-time Eurovision contestant, 86
- 5 October - Yakov Alpert, Ukrainian-born physicist, expert on radio communications, 99
