= 2012 in Switzerland =

- Decades: 1990s; 2000s; 2010s; 2020s
- See also: History of Switzerland; Timeline of Swiss history; List of years in Switzerland

Events from 2012 in Switzerland.

== Incumbents ==
- Federal Council:
  - Doris Leuthard
  - Eveline Widmer-Schlumpf (President)
  - Ueli Maurer
  - Didier Burkhalter
  - Johann Schneider-Ammann
  - Simonetta Sommaruga
  - Alain Berset

== Events ==
- January 13–15 – 2012 International Bernese Ladies Cup is in play
- March 13 – Sierre coach crash, kills 28 of 52
- March 31–April 8 – The 2012 World Men's Curling Championship takes place in Basel.
- April 8 – 2012 World Men's Curling Championship ends
- August 30–September 8 – 2012 Asian Tour, partially held in Switzerland
- October 4–October 7 – 2012 Swiss Cup Basel is in play
- October 22–October 28 – 2012 Swiss Indoors is in play
- December 26–December 31 – 2012 Spengler Cup was in play
- Swiss Space Systems is established
- 1. Liga Promotion is established

== Deaths ==
- 12 March – Friedhelm Konietzka, German-born Swiss footballer and manager (born 1938)
- 7 July – Leon Schlumpf, politician (born 1925)
- 13 September – Otto Stich, politician (born 1927)

== See also ==
- Public holidays in Switzerland
- List of number-one hits of 2012 (Switzerland)
- 2012 Swiss referendums
- Category:2012 in Swiss sport
