= Luis Chávez =

Luis Chávez may refer to:

- Luis Chávez (footballer) (born 1996), Mexican footballer
- Luis Antonio Chávez (died 2010), Honduran journalist and radio host
