= D'Mello =

D'Mello is a surname. Notable people with the name include:

- Ambrose D'Mello (1922–2010), Indian Jesuit priest
- Beevan D'Mello (born 1987), Indian footballer
- Dave D'Mello (born 1970), British dance music DJ and record producer
- Milton D'Mello (born 1925), Pakistani field hockey player
- Placid D'Mello (1919–1958), Indian trade union leader
- Raymond D'Mello, 20th-century Roman Catholic bishop in India
- Rockie D'Mello (born 1961), Indian-born Kenyan cricket umpire
- Suzanne D'Mello, Indian playback singer of Bollywood films
- William Leonard D'Mello (1931–2011), Roman Catholic bishop of the Diocese of Karwar, India

== See also ==
- 30272 D'Mello, minor planet, 3.9 km diameter
- D'Mello House, abandoned mansion built during the Portuguese rule in Goa, in Santimol, Raia
- P D'Mello Road, 6 km long arterial north–south access road in Mumbai
