= Charles Meade (disambiguation) =

Charles Meade was the founder of a church.

Charles Meade may also refer to:

- Charles Francis Meade, mountaineer
- Charles Meade, character in The Secret Circle (TV series)
