= Vergnes =

Vergnes is a French surname. Notable people with the surname include:

- Bastien Vergnes-Taillefer (born 1997), French rugby union player
- Jacques Vergnes (1948–2025), French footballer
- Jean Vergnes (1921–2010), French chef
