= Sierre Tunnel =

Road tunnel in Switzerland

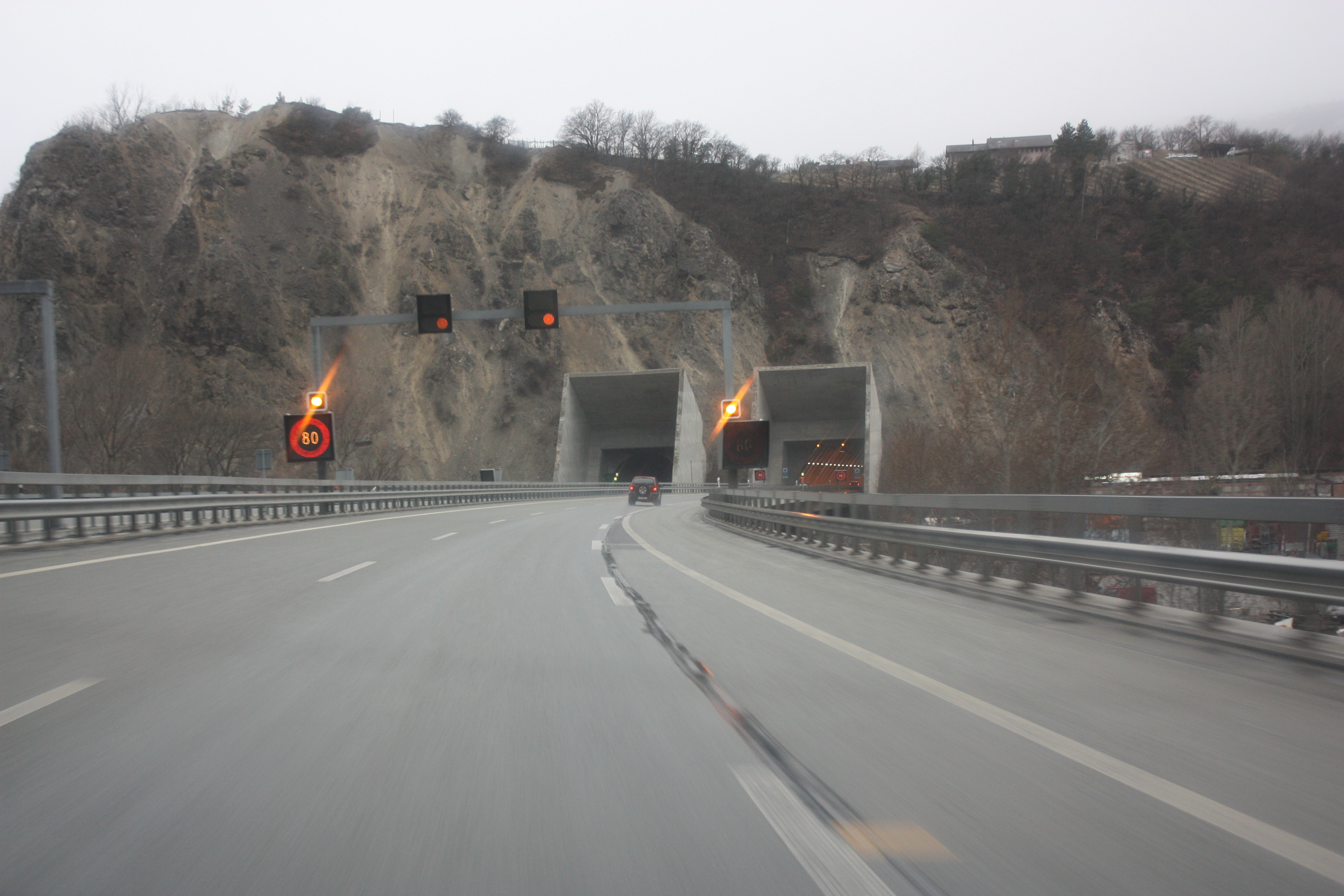
- East portal (2012)

Overview
- Location: Sierre, Valais, Switzerland
- Coordinates: 46.284°N 7.532°E
- Route: A9 Autobahn

Operation
- Opened: 1999

Technical
- Length: 2,460 metres (8,070 ft)
- Grade: Good

The Sierre Tunnel (French: Tunnel de Sierre) is a tunnel near Sierre in the Swiss canton of Valais. It is part of the A9 Autobahn and is located between Sierre and Sierre-Est-Ouest.

The tunnel was opened in 1999 and consists of two tubes of 2,460 metres (8,070 ft) in length. In a tunnel test by the European Tunnel Assessment Programme (EuroTAP) in 2005 it was rated as "good" – the second-highest grade out of five.

The two tubes consist of four linked tunnels, namely,

- Alusuisse — 1,070 metres (3,510 ft),
- Contoured — 620 metres (2,030 ft),
- Crête Plane — 180 metres (590 ft), and
- Ancien Sierre Plant Composition — 580 metres (1,900 ft).

The Sierre Tunnel came to international attention in March 2012 after a coach crash inside resulted in the deaths of 28 people, including 22 children, who were returning to Belgium from a school skiing holiday.

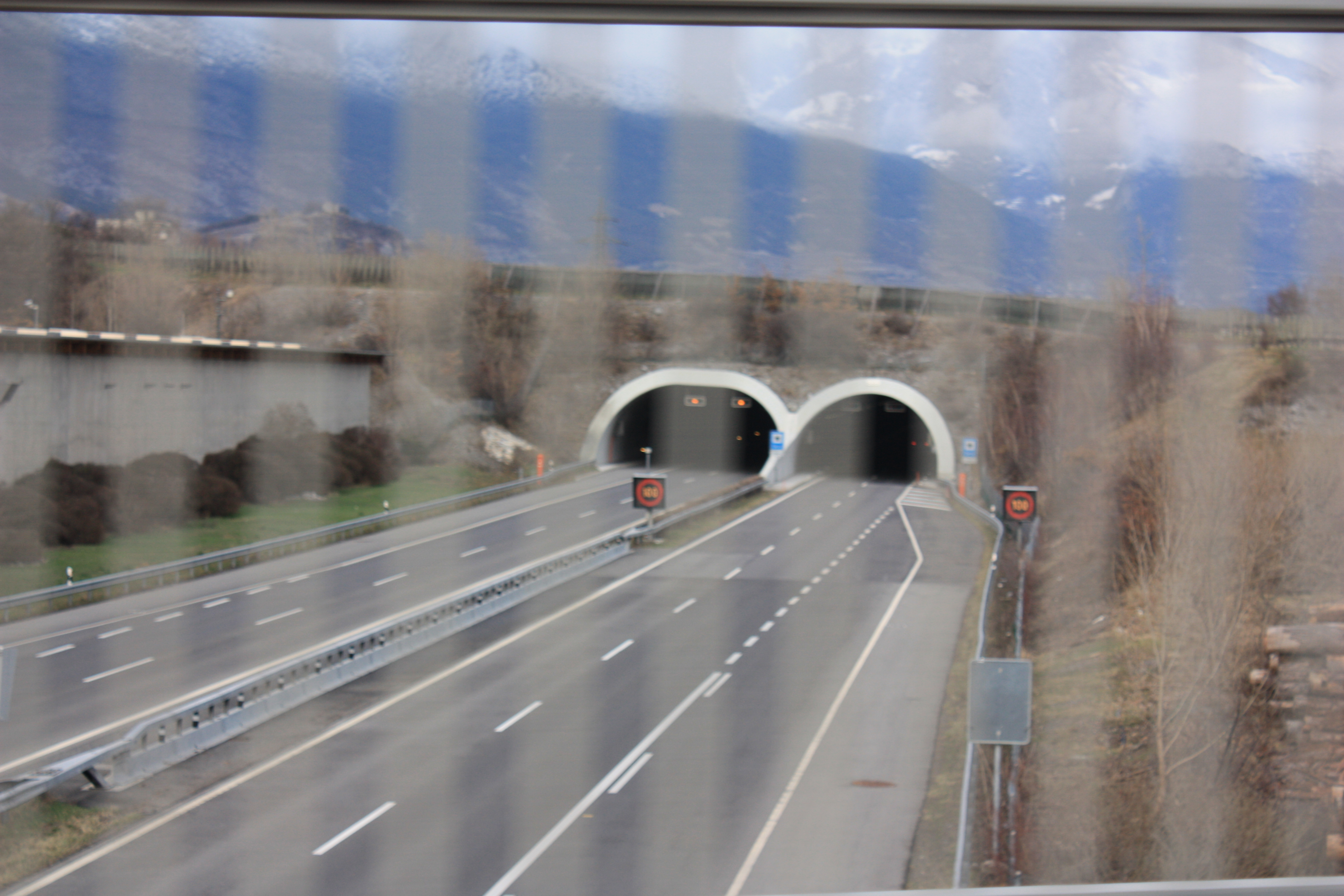
West portal (2012)
