= 2011 in Switzerland =

- Decades: 1990s; 2000s; 2010s; 2020s
- See also: History of Switzerland; Timeline of Swiss history; List of years in Switzerland

Events from 2011 in Switzerland.

== Incumbents ==
- Federal Council:
  - Doris Leuthard
  - Eveline Widmer-Schlumpf
  - Ueli Maurer
  - Didier Burkhalter
  - Johann Schneider-Ammann
  - Simonetta Sommaruga
  - Micheline Calmy-Rey (President)

== Events ==
- 24–30 January – The 2011 European Figure Skating Championships take place in Bern.
- May–June – 2011 Germany E. coli O104:H4 outbreak affects Switzerland
- June 16 – Convention on Domestic Workers is signed in Geneva
- July 2 – Swiss tourists are kidnapped in Balochistan
- July 25–July 31 – 2011 Crédit Agricole Suisse Open Gstaad was in play
- August – August 2011 stock markets fall affects the Swiss Franc
- August 17–August 21 – 2011 Basel Summer Ice Hockey was in play
- October 31–November 6 – 2011 Swiss Indoors was in play
- November 25–27 – 2011 International ZO Women's Tournament was in play
- December 15–December 22 – Cyclone Joachim affected Switzerland
- December 26–December 31 – 2011 Spengler Cup was in play
- Anti-PowerPoint Party is established
- Propulsion Universelle et Recuperation d'Energie is established
- Swiss Accident Investigation Board is established

== Deaths ==
- April 28 – Erhard Loretan, mountain climber (born 1959)
- December 7 – Clemens Thoma, theologian (born 1932)

== See also ==
- Public holidays in Switzerland
- List of Swiss people
- List of number-one hits of 2011 (Switzerland)
