= Corrales (surname) =

Corrales is a Spanish surname. Notable people with the surname include:

- Cristina Corrales (1962–2010), Bolivian journalist, radio broadcaster, and politician
- Diego Corrales (1977–2007), American boxer
- Enrique Corrales (born 1982), Spanish football player
- Jorge Luis Corrales (born 1991), Cuban football player
- Julien Corrales, French music producer
- Lucía Corrales (born 2005), Spanish footballer who plays in the English Women's Super League
- Pat Corrales (1941–2023), American baseball player
- Pilita Corrales (1939–2025), Filipino pop singer, songwriter and actress
- Ramiro Corrales (born 1977), American soccer player
- Raydel Corrales (born 1982), Cuban volleyball player
- Rudis Alberto Corrales Rivera (born 1979), Salvadoran football player
- Sara Corrales (born 1984), Colombian actress, model, dancer and business owner
