= Sierre coach crash =

2012 deadly road accident in the Sierre Tunnel, Switzerland

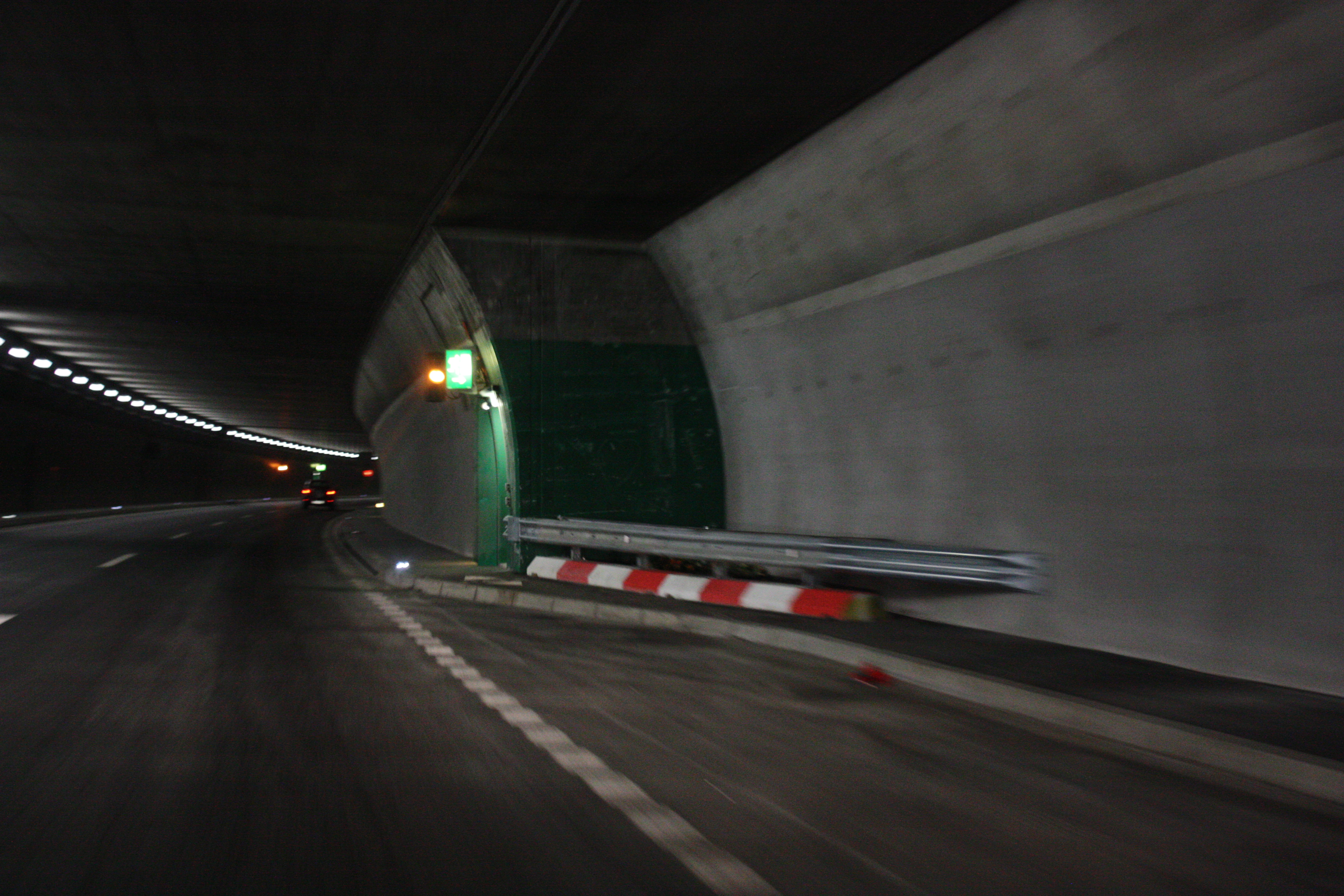
- Crash location updated with guardrails to defer vehicles back into the roadway instead of colliding with the wall as the bus did
- Date: 13 March 2012
- Time: 21:15 CET
- Location: Sierre Tunnel, A9 motorway Valais, Switzerland; 46.284°N 7.532°E
- Filmed by: Closed-circuit television
- Deaths: 28
- Injuries: 24
- Property damage: 1 coach
- Location in Switzerland

The Sierre bus crash occurred on 13 March 2012 near Sierre, Switzerland, when a coach carrying school teachers and pupils crashed into a wall in the Sierre Tunnel. 52 people were on board, 28 of whom were killed in the crash, including both drivers, all four teachers, and 22 of the 46 children. 24 other pupils, all aged between ten and 12, were injured, including three who were hospitalised with serious brain and chest injuries.

The coach was one of three operated by the Aarschot-based Top Tours company and was transporting mostly Belgian school teachers and students from a skiing holiday in Val d'Anniviers back to their two schools in Belgium. It crashed at around 9.15 pm CET while travelling on the A9 motorway near Sierre, in the southern canton of Valais.

It was Switzerland's second-worst road accident in history and the country's worst in a motorway tunnel. The investigation into the crash initially closed inconclusively in May 2013, having ruled out a number of factors that had been the subject of media speculation but failing to identify a cause. A further public investigation, closing at the end of June 2014, attributed the crash to a non-criminal error on the part of the coach driver. Media speculation has continued.

== Circumstances ==
The passengers, four teachers and 46 pupils from Saint-Lambertus school in Heverlee, Flemish Brabant, and 't Stekske primary school in Lommel, Limburg, were returning home with two other schools originating from Beersel and Haasrode, Flemish Brabant, having spent the previous few days at a skiing resort in Val d'Anniviers in the Swiss Alps.

The crash occurred shortly after 9 pm local time (CET) on 13 March 2012, when the coach, while in the Sierre Tunnel, lost control, veered, slammed into a curb and then struck a concrete wall head-on, at the end of an emergency turnout area. The front portion of the vehicle was seriously damaged, initially trapping some survivors inside for some time; the side and rear windows of the coach had to be smashed by emergency workers in order to gain access to the trapped passengers.

Rescuers described the scene as "apocalyptic" and some became distressed as they fought to remove dead and injured children from the wreckage. Eight air ambulances and a dozen road ambulances were used to send injured victims directly to several hospitals for treatment. The most seriously injured children were sent directly to hospitals in Bern and Lausanne for treatment.

The coach was one of three hired by the group; the other two reached Belgium safely. Among the passengers aboard the crashed bus were 39 Belgians, ten Dutch children, one German child, one British child, and one Polish child.

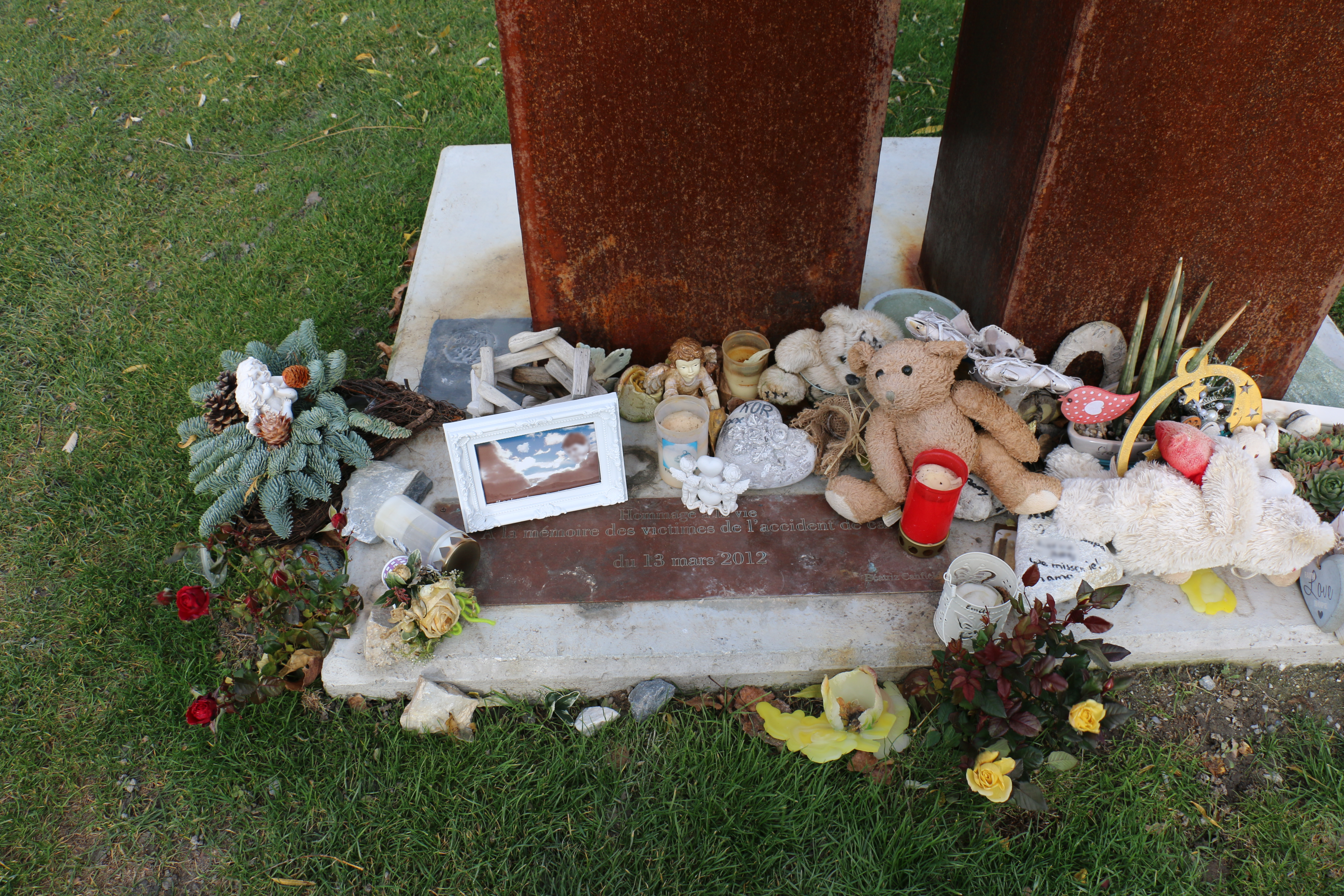
A memorial inaugurated three years after the drama of Sierre.

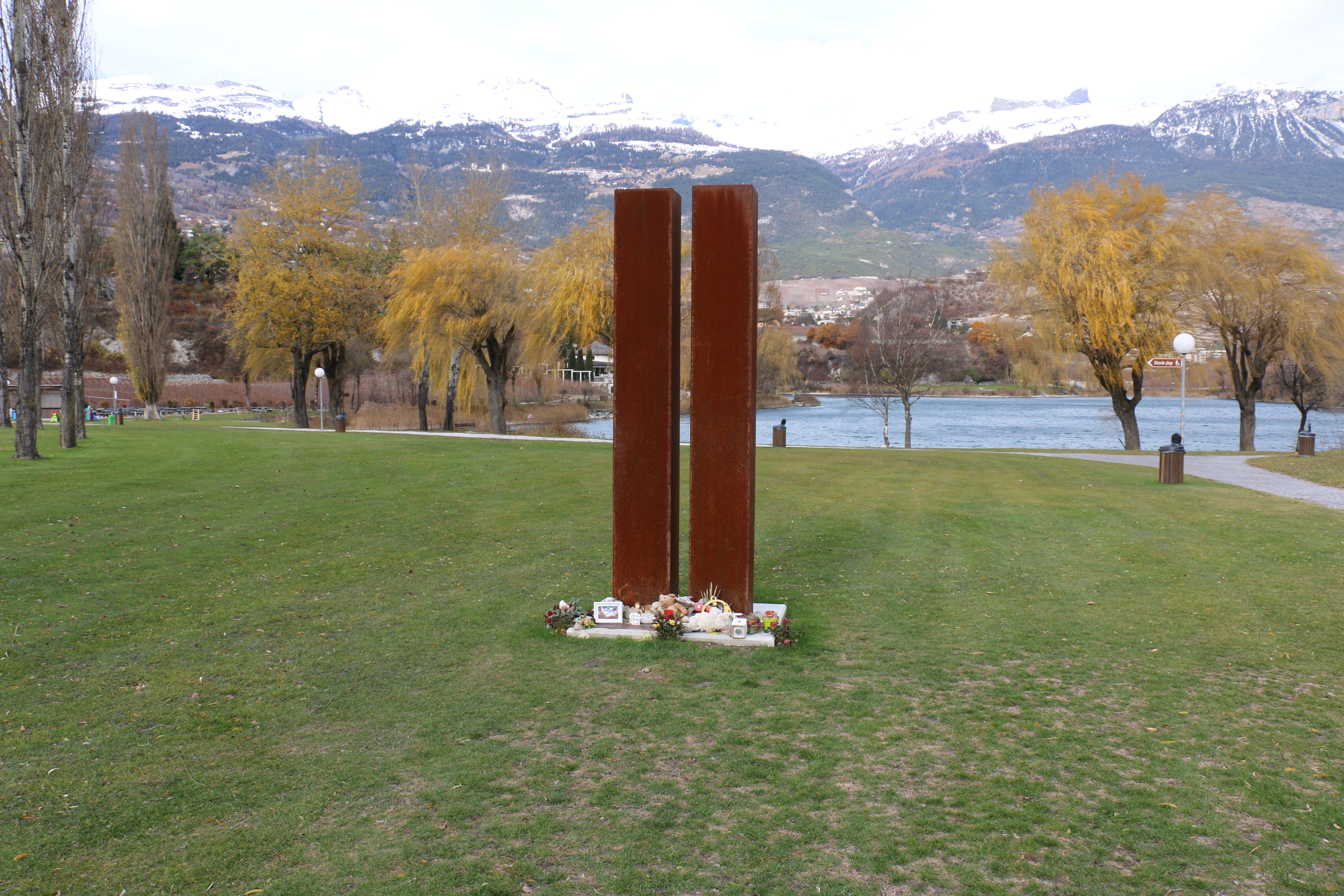
A monument in memory of the 28 victims, including 22 children, who died in the March 2012 coach accident in Valais.

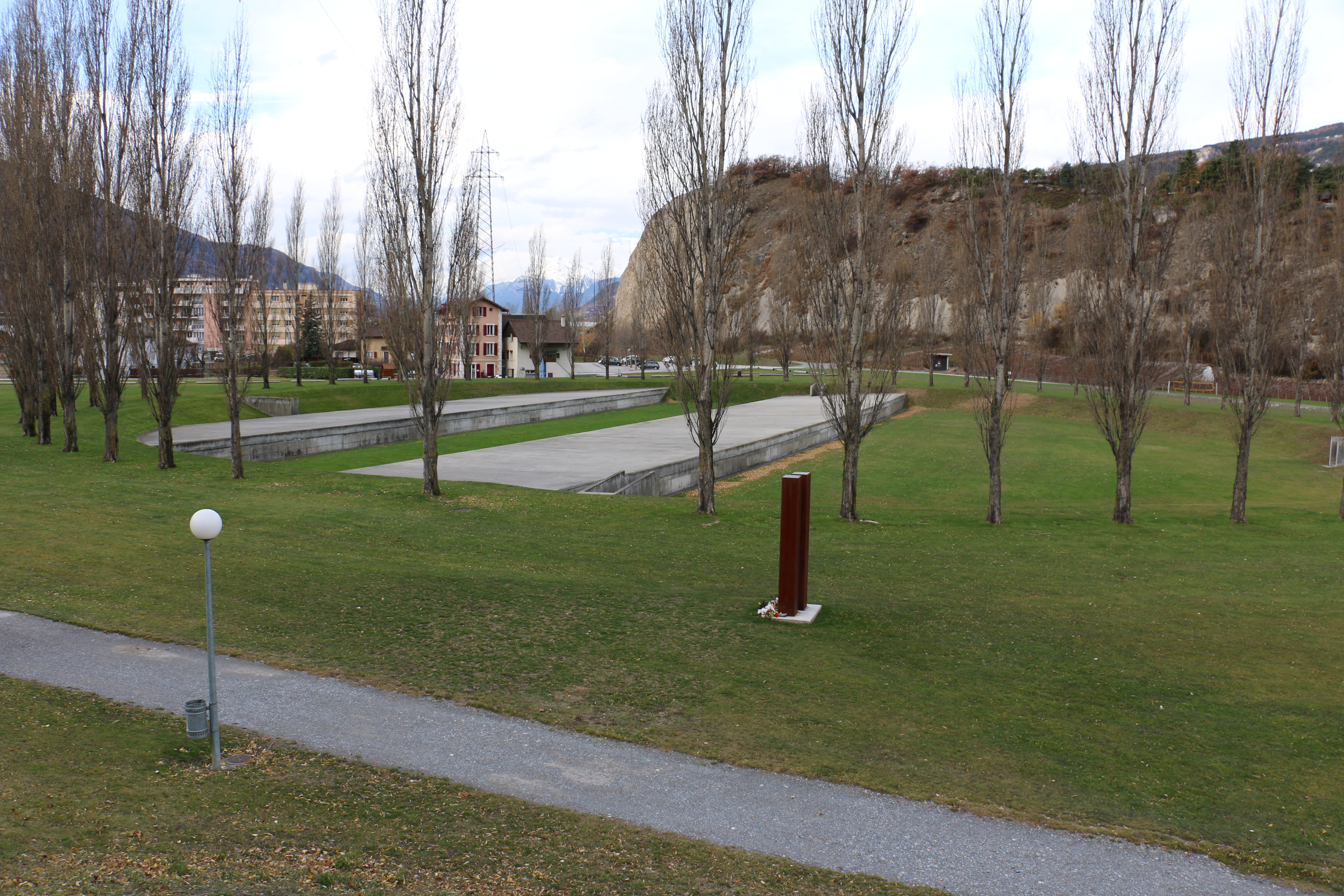
Auguste Piccard Space in Sierre with a circle of trees above the tunnel.

== Passengers ==
Most of the passengers aboard the coach were Belgian nationals. Six of the 10 Dutch passengers were killed, as well as one schoolboy with dual Belgian-British nationality.

Country	Passengers	Fatalities
Belgium	39	21
Netherlands	10	6
Belgium/United Kingdom	1	1
Germany	1	0
Poland	1	0
Total	52	28

== Cause ==
The exact cause of the crash was never completely determined. Investigators eventually concluded the driver of the bus made an error in handling the bus, but could not elaborate as to the specifics of the error or why the driver made it. Tests revealed the driver was not intoxicated with alcohol, did not suffer a heart attack or any other sudden illness, and prosecutors stated he was not exceeding the 100 km/h (62 mph) speed limit at the time of the crash. Experts have narrowed the cause of the crash to either driver fatigue or some sort of undetected medical issue. Police said that the coach, operated by Aarschot-based Top Tours, a company with an "excellent reputation", was a modern and well-maintained vehicle, and that the children had all been wearing the fitted seatbelts at the time of impact. The inconclusive outcome of the investigations into the accident was met with anger from parents of the victims.

Both drivers and all four teachers upon the coach died in the accident. However, 24 of the 46 children aboard the vehicle survived and some were able to provide witness statements.

The design of the turnout area, which ended abruptly in a concrete wall, contributed to the severity of the crash.

== Reactions ==
Belgium declared a day of national mourning on 16 March 2012 in memory of the 28 people who died in the crash, including 21 Belgian nationals, with flags being flown at half-mast and a minute's silence being observed. Peter Vanvelthoven, the mayor of Lommel, whose school lost 15 of its 22 pupils and both of the teachers aboard the coach, announced a memorial service the next week in the town, with attendees including the Belgian royal family and Prince Willem-Alexander and Maxima of the Netherlands.

== See also ==
- Beaune coach crash - a bus crash in France in 1982, where 53 people died, mostly children
- Måbødalen bus accident - bus whose brakes failed crashed into the exit of a tunnel
- Puisseguin road crash - in 2015, a bus catching fire after a crash in France, killing 43 persons
