= Georgino Orellana =

Honduran journalist (1960–2010)

Jorge Alberto Georgino Orellana
- Born: February 14, 1960
- Died: April 20, 2010 (aged 50); San Pedro Sula, Cortés, Honduras
- Occupation(s): Journalist; Television producer and presenter

Jorge Alberto "Georgino" Orellana (February 14, 1960 – April 20, 2010) was a Honduran journalist, television producer and presenter for Televisión de Honduras, a private television station. Orellana was shot and killed on April 20, 2010, becoming the sixth Honduran journalist to be killed in the country since March 1, 2010.

In addition to his television work, Orellana was a journalism professor at the National Autonomous University of Honduras in San Pedro Sula. He was previously employed by the Prensa newspaper and Televicentro, one Honduras' largest television networks. Orellana departed Televicentro following the 2009 Honduran coup d'état, citing a difference of opinion over the station's editorial position on the country's interim government of President Roberto Micheletti. (Televicentro had favored the interim government over ousted former President Manuel Zelaya).

Orellana hosted the television news program, En vivo con Georgino (Georgino Live), Televisión de Honduras in the northern city of San Pedro Sula. However, Orellana did not report on controversial political or social problems, such as the government or drug trafficking.

Orellana was shot as he left the Televisión de Honduras station in San Pedro Sula on April 20, 2010, at approximately 9 p.m. He was taken to Hospital Mario Catarino Rivas, where he was pronounced dead, becoming the sixth journalist to be killed in Honduras since March 1, 2010.
