= Binyamin Balanero =

Israeli footballer

Binyamin Balanero בנימין בלנרו
Personal information
- Full name: Binyamin Balanero
- Date of birth: 2 February 1942
- Date of death: 14 April 2010 (aged 68)
- Place of death: Tel Aviv, Israel

Senior career*
Years	Team	Apps	(Gls)
1958–1965	Hapoel Hadera		
1965–1968	Johannesburg Rangers		
1969	Hakoah Sydney		
1969–1973	Beitar Tel Aviv		

International career
1962–1970	Israel	5	(0)
- * Club domestic league appearances and goals

Binyamin Balanero (Hebrew: בנימין בלנרו) was an Israeli footballer.

== Honours ==
- Israeli Second Division
  - Runner-up (1): 1963-64
