= Lorette Wood =

American politician

Mayor of Santa Cruz, California
- In office April 20, 1971 – April 25, 1972
- Preceded by: Ernest Wicklund Jr.
- Succeeded by: Al Castagnola

Personal details
- Born: May 17, 1915 Mission San Jose, Fremont, California
- Died: April 20, 2010 (aged 94)
- Party: Republican
- Spouse: Edwin H. Wood (?-1977; his death)
- Education: San Jose State University; University of California, Berkeley
- Profession: Teacher, politician

Lorette M. Wood (May 17, 1915 – April 20, 2010) was an American politician. Wood was the first woman to be elected to the city council of Santa Cruz, California, in 1967. She later became the first woman to serve as mayor of Santa Cruz upon her appointment to the office by city council in 1971.

== Biography ==
Lorette Wood was born in what was then called Mission San Jose, California, on May 17, 1915. Her family operated a farm. She received her bachelor's degree in education from San Jose State University and a master's degree from the University of California, Berkeley, also in education.

She met her future husband, Edwin H. Wood, a member of the U.S. Army and surfer, while studying in Hawaii during the summer. He visited her at her family's farm while travelling back to New York, but he decided to stay in California with her instead of continuing to the East Coast. The couple soon married and had one son, Ed Wood. Her husband died in 1977.

In 1943, Lorette Wood moved with her family to Santa Cruz, California, where she resided for the rest of her life. The move was due to Edwin Woods job; he originally worked for Pacific Oil and Burner in Monterey, California. However, the company opened a new branch office in Santa Cruz, necessitating the family's relocation.

=== Political career ===
Lorette Wood first became engaged in local Santa Cruz politics during the middle of the 1940s. A teacher by profession, Wood argued against the local Santa Cruz school board's policy of terminating teachers if they became pregnant. Wood noted that the policy lead to the unnecessary loss of qualified educators in the school district.

Wood's involvement in the controversy led her to become president of the Parent-Teacher Association (PTA). She soon began campaigning with and supporting local political candidates in Santa Cruz.

Wood, a member of the Republican Party, was first elected to the Santa Cruz city council in 1967, becoming the city's first female councilwoman. In 1971, the city council further appointed Wood as Santa Cruz's first female mayor. During her tenure within the city council and mayor's office, Wood openly collaborated with and supported the newly opened University of California, Santa Cruz, whose influence gradually shifted the city's politics in a more progressive direction.

She retired from the city council in 1975. A woman's rights advocate, Wood was an active member of Planned Parenthood's Santa Cruz chapter.

Lorette Wood died on April 20, 2010, at the age of 94. She was survived by her son, Ed Wood, and granddaughter, Kelsey Phillips.
