= James Brody =

American composer (1941–2010)

James Brody (July 13, 1941 – April 11, 2010) was an American composer, born in Clearfield, Pennsylvania. Frank J. Oteri of the American Music Center's New Music Box called Brody "an important figure in the development of electronic music in the Midwest."

He studied with Franz Kamin at the Indiana University School of Music, under the Greek composer Iannis Xenakis, where he received a master's degree. Brody wrote the liner notes for the original Nonesuch LP of Iannis Xenakis – Electroacoustic Music. He taught composition, theory and electronic music at East Texas State University and was a lecturer at York College of Pennsylvania from 2005 to 2007. He also served on the Harrisburg Symphony Orchestra's Board of Directors.

Brody was a guest composer at the Electronic and Computer Music Studio of the Peabody Institute and a member and past president of the Baltimore Composers Forum. He hosted a radio program on KUNM-FM in Albuquerque, New Mexico called Other Voices, Other Sounds. He was co-founder of music organizations in Bloomington, Indiana and San Antonio, Texas, dedicated to presenting and performing works by local composers. James Brody died in a car crash in Roseville, Minnesota, along with fellow composer Franz Kamin.
