= Thomas Mikolajcik =

United States Air Force general

Thomas Roy Mikolajcik
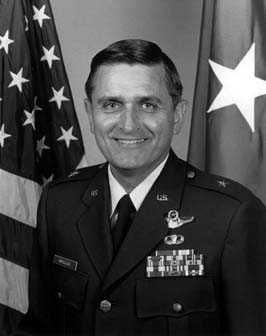
- Brigadier General Thomas R. Mikolajcik
- Born: August 17, 1946; Norwich, Connecticut
- Died: April 17, 2010 (aged 63); Charleston County, South Carolina
- Spouse: Mary Carmen Heft
- Relatives: Teofila Wasbiewski Mikolajcik (mother), Roy Mikolajcik (father)
- Military career
- Allegiance: United States of America
- Branch: United States Air Force
- Service years: 1969–1996
- Rank: Brigadier general
- Conflicts: Vietnam War; Cold War; Operation Restore Hope
- Awards: Legion of Merit (3); Defense Meritorious Service Medal

Brigadier General Thomas Roy Mikolajcik (August 17, 1947 – April 17, 2010) was director of transportation, Office of the Deputy Chief of Staff, logistics, Headquarters United States Air Force, Washington, D.C. He provided guidance and direction to Air Force activities on transportation plans, policy and programs. Also included is the movement of Air Force-sponsored passengers, patients, personal property (household goods, unaccompanied baggage, privately owned vehicles, mobile homes and weapons), and cargo by all modes of commercial and military carriers.

General Mikolajcik was a 1969 graduate of the United States Air Force Academy. He completed pilot training in 1970, and served as a C-141 pilot, instructor, aircraft commander, war plans officer, current operations officer, mobility project officer, and adviser to the chief of staff for airlift and logistics policy. He held several staff positions including as a member of the C-X taskforce that wrote the requirements for the C-17 Globemaster III. He also served as squadron commander, wing vice commander and commander of two wings. Additionally, he was the U.S. Air Force component commander in Somalia from December 1992 to March 1993 during Operation Restore Hope. He was a command pilot with more than 4,000 flying hours.

General Mikolajcik retired from military service on October 1, 1996.

The Mikolajcik Child Development Center at Charleston Air Force Base, South Carolina and the Mikolajcik Engineering Laboratory Center at the Space and Naval Warfare Systems Center (SPAWAR) in Charleston are named in his honor.

== Awards and decorations ==
Mikolajcik's awards include the Legion of Merit (two Oak Leaf Clusters), the Defense Meritorious Service Medal, the Meritorious Service Medal (three Oak Leaf Clusters). He was also honored with the 1993 Norwich Native Son Award.

Legion of Merit with two Oak leaf clusters
Defense Meritorious Service Medal
Meritorious Service Medal with three Oak Leaf Clusters
Aerial Achievement Medal
Air Force Outstanding Unit Award with two Oak Leaf Clusters
Air Force Commendation Medal with two Oak Leaf Clusters
Combat Readiness Medal
National Defense Service Medal with Oak Leaf Cluster
Vietnam Service Medal with three service stars
Air Force Longevity Service Award with Oak Leaf Cluster
Small Arms Expert Marksmanship Ribbon
Air Force Training Ribbon
Vietnam Gallantry Cross with Palm
Vietnam Campaign Medal
