= Roy Baird =

English production manager, director, and producer

Roy Baird (1933–2010) was an English production manager, assistant director and producer, best known for his collaborations with Ken Russell, David Puttnam and The Who.

== Select Credits ==
- Lisztomania (1975)
- Quadrophenia (1978)
