= Alastair Dowell =

Scottish cricketer

Personal information
- Full name: Alastair McQueen Dowell
- Born: 17 May 1920; Kinross, Kinross-shire, Scotland
- Died: 9 April 2010 (aged 89); Alloa, Clackmannanshire, Scotland
- Batting: Right-handed
- Bowling: Right-arm fast-medium

International information
- National side: Scotland

Career statistics
Competition	FC
Matches	3
Runs scored	6
Batting average	2.00
100s/50s	–/–
Top score	5
Balls bowled	342
Wickets	2
Bowling average	68.00
5 wickets in innings	–
10 wickets in match	–
Best bowling	2/51
Catches/stumpings	–/–
- Source: Cricinfo, 15 May 2010

Alastair McQueen Dowell (17 April 1920 – 9 April 2010) was a Scottish cricketer. Dowell was a right-handed batsman who bowled right-arm fast-medium.

Dowell made his first-class debut for Scotland against Worcestershire in 1951. Dowell represented Scotland in 2 further first-class matches against Northamptonshire in 1953 and Lancashire in 1955. In his 3 first-class matches he took 2 wickets at a bowling average of 68.00.

Dowell died at Alloa, Clackmannanshire on 9 April 2010.
