= Franz Kamin =

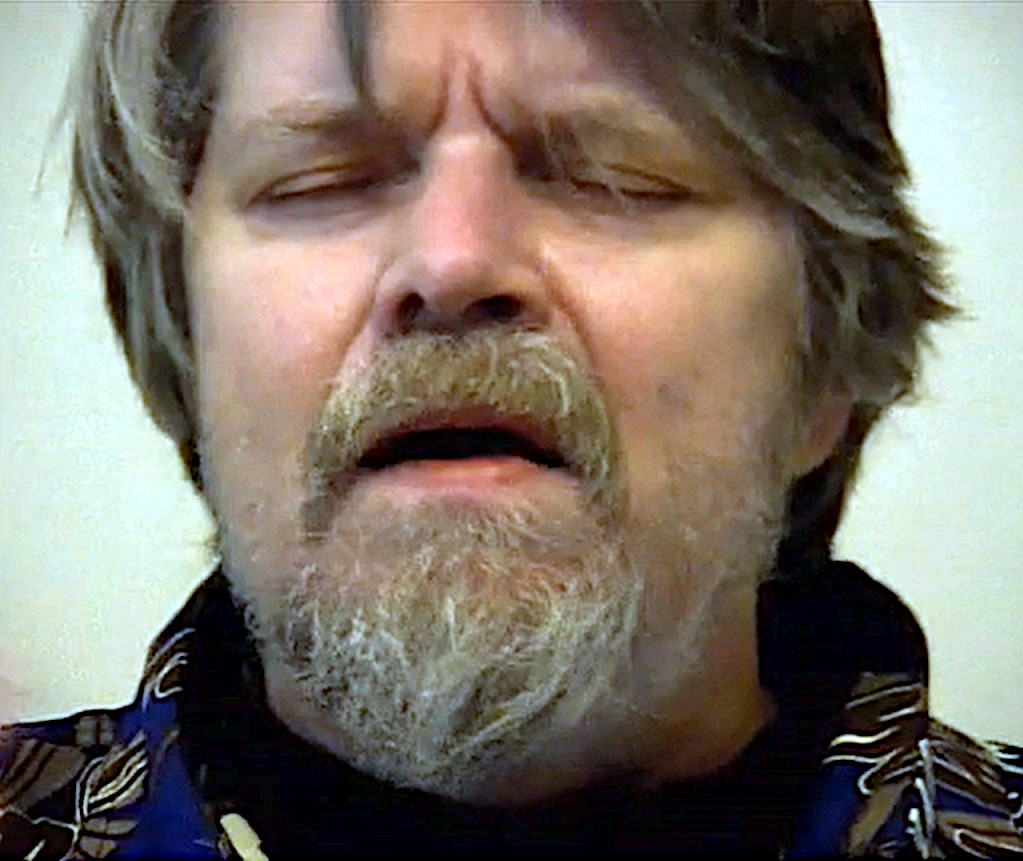
- Born: May 25, 1941; Milwaukee, Wisconsin, U.S.
- Died: April 11, 2010 (aged 68); Roseville, Minnesota, U.S.
- Education: University of Oklahoma; Indiana University School of Music
- Occupations: Author; composer; poet; artist; pianist

Franz Kamin (May 25, 1941 – April 11, 2010) was an American author, composer, poet, performance-installation artist, and pianist whose works explore structural principles derived from topology, general systems theory, prosody, and meditational processes in unusual combinations of genre and technique. He made use of conventional instruments and children's toys; sound poetry and puppet theater; choreography and speaking chorus; systematic chance operations and both programmed and otherwise uncommon improvisation; performance scribbling and the live reading of narrative texts.

Born in Milwaukee, Kamin studied composition at the University of Oklahoma with Spencer Norton, and at Indiana University School of Music with Roque Cordero, where he also studied piano with Alfonso Montecino. While at Indiana University, Kamin, together with fellow composer James Brody organized FIASCO, an experimental collective which meet weekly in Bloomington from 1966 to 1972. Among his compositions from this period was "The Concert of Doors", a synaesthetic work in which a number of doors, each of vastly differing design, some found, some constructed, ranging from comical to mysterious, were set on a path through a wood to be traversed by the audience-participants. Kamin moved to New York City in the 1970s and collaborated with cellist Charlotte Moorman, a fixture in the downtown avant-garde scene at that time. He eventually settled in Saint Paul, Minnesota, where he remained for the rest of his life.

Kamin published two books full books of trans-genre work: Ann-Margret Loves You & Other Psychotopological Diversions (1980) and Scribble Death (Station Hill Press: Barrytown, New York). Several of his shorter works, musical scores and an LP recording of Behavioral Drift II and Rugugmool have also been published.

He was killed in a car crash in Roseville, Minnesota when a car driven by James Brody, who also died, left the road, jumped a curb, and hit a tree. The two composers were returning from a SEAMUS festival in St. Cloud, Minnesota. Their names were released on April 12, 2010, by the Ramsey County medical examiner's office.
