= Lothar Engelhardt =

- MajGen L.Engelhardt (2nd left) with MajGen B.Beyer, Col. R.Hertzsch and Capt(Nav.) S.Schneider.
- Born: 5 July 1939; Wangenheim, Germany
- Died: 5 April 2010 (aged 70) Potsdam, Germany
- Buried: Potsdam, Germany
- Allegiance: GDR
- Branch: National People's Army; Land force
- Service years: 1959–1990
- Rank: Generalmajor
- Commands: Commander in chief of the NPA
- Awards

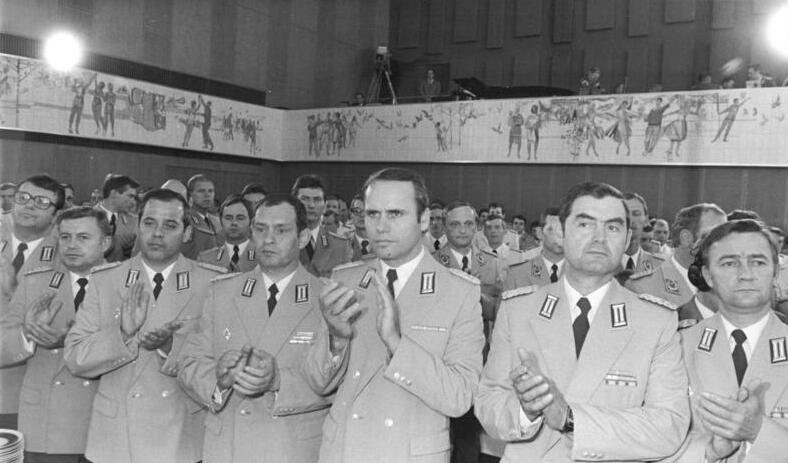
Col. Engelhardt (4th f.t.l.) during the reception of the 1984 graduates

Lothar Engelhardt (5 July 1939 – 5 April 2010) was a graduated military scientist, Major General, and the last Commander in Chief of the National People's Army in the former German Democratic Republic.

== Biography ==
Lothar Engelhardt was born on 5 July 1939 in Wangenheim, district of Gotha, as son of a farmer's family. He successfully passed the school-leaving examination of the secondary school and joined the Guard Regiment Hugo Eberlein of the National People's Army in 1959. There he became a professional soldier and applied in 1959 for the attendance of the Armord Corp's Officers School in Großenhain. After successful graduation in 1961 he became a professional officer and served as platoon leader in the 15th Armord Regiment (German: Panzer Regiment 15) of the 7th Panzer Division. In this military unit he became also a member of the Socialist Unity Party of Germany.

Due to his permanent excellent performance Engelhardt was delegated to the Officer Higher Special School of the Ministry of National Defence (East Germany) (MOD East Germany) from 1962 to 1964, in order to receive combat reconnaissance training. After he passed successfully this course, he served in the reconnaissance division of the MOD East Germany until 1966.

This was followed by an assignment as company chief in the Reconnaissance Battalion 7 of the 7th Panzer Division. Because he performed in this unit excellent as well, he was delegated to high-school study on the Military University of the Armord Corps in Moscow (Soviet Union) from 1970 to 1973.

After successful graduation in military science (de: Diplommilitärwissenschaftler, Dipl.-Mil.) he served until 1976 as senior officer for reconnaissance in the Military District Command III (Leipzig). During this tour of duty he was promoted to lieutenant colonel, attended diverse special courses, among other France language courses on the National People's Army's Foreign Language Institute in Naumburg.

Than he was appointed from 1978 to 1980 as chief of the Troop Reconnaissance Section (de: Unterabteilung Truppenaufklärung) subordinated to the Chief of Reconnaissance in the Department/Ground Forces Command in Potsdam (Gelto). This was followed by an assignment now as Chief of Reconnaissance of the Military District Command V (Neubrandenburg).

Hereafter Engelhardt was assigned to the command and general staff officers course to the General Staff Academy (Russia) from 1982 to 1984. After successful study colonel Engelhard was assigned as Chief of the Reconnaissance Reconnaissance Department of the Ground Forces Command. On this position he served until 1987. On 1 March 1988 he was designed to major general and became the Deputy Chief of Staff for Operative, and little after Deputy Commander in Chief and Chief of Staff in the Ground Forces Command. On 15 September 1990 he was designed to the Commander in Chief of the National People's Army in the new East German Ministry of Disarmament and Defense.

== Retirement ==
With the disbandment of the National People's Army major general Engelhardt retired with effect from 2 October 1990.

Upon the reunification of Germany on 3 October 1990, Engelhardt was selected to serve as a civilian advisor with the Bundeswehr-Kommando Ost commanded by Lieutenant General Jörg Schönbohm. He was appointed advisor to the Bundeswehr liaison group headed by major general Hartmut Foertsch to the Group of Soviet Forces in Germany (Army General Boris Wassiljewitsch Snetkow; replaced by Colonel General Matwei Prokopjewitsch Burlakow on 13 December 1990). Additionally, Engelhardt was responsible for all general questions relating to the former National People's Army.

== Orders and decorations ==
Among numerous orders and decorations major general Lothar Engelhardt was awarded with:

- Order of Struggle “for Merit to the People and Fatherland” in Silver (Kampforden "Für Verdienste um Volk und Vaterland)
- Medal of Merit of the German Democratic Republic (Verdienstmedaille der DDR)
- Medal of Merit of the National People's Army in Gold
- Medal Brotherhood in Arms
- Medal 30th Anniversary of the Foundation of the GDR (Medaille 30. Jahrestag der Gründung der DDR)
- Medal for Faithful Service in the National People's Army in Bronze, Silver, Gold, and 20 years service (Gold)

== Sources, references ==
- Schönbohm, Jörg. Two Armies and One Fatherland. Peter and Elfi Johnson, translators. Berghahn Books, Providence, Rhode Island, 1996 (originally published in 1992 in Germany as Zwei Armeen und ein Vaterland)
