= Alexander Sliussarev =

Russian photographer and translator (1944 – 2010)

- Born: 9 October 1944; Moscow, USSR
- Died: 23 April 2010 (aged 65); Moscow, Russia

Alexander Alexanderovitch Sliussarev (Russian: Александр Александрович Слюсарев; also known as San Sanich Sliussarev, Russian: Сан Саныч Слюсарев) (9 October 1944, Moscow – 23 April 2010, Moscow) was a Russian photographer and translator from Italian.

== Biography ==
Alexander Sliussarev was born in 1944 in Moscow, Russia. He started taking pictures in 1958 with his first camera "Yunost", received as a gift from his father. In 1962, he participated in "Nasha Yunost'" ("Our Youth") exhibition in the Gorky Park in Moscow. Alexander Sliussarev graduated from Maurice Thorez Moscow State Pedagogical Institute of Foreign Languages (Russian: Институт иностранных языков им. Мориса Тореза) as a professional translator from Italian. During his career as a translator he worked with Gianni Rodari, Marcello Argilli and many others. In 1979 he had his first personal exhibition at the Baltic photo festival in Ogre, Latvia. From 1974 to 1984 he created a series of black and white minimalistic "squares" taken with a Rolleiflex camera, which made the photographer famous among fellow photographers and curators. Since 1980 he had numerous exhibitions in Russia and abroad. He continued his photographic work and published his photographs in his blog almost every day, until his last day in April 2010. Alexander Sliussarev had been a member of the Direct Photography (Russian: «Непосредственная фотография») group since 1987. He also was a member of the Union of Photo Artists of Russia.

== Personal exhibitions ==
- 1979—1980 — «Alexander Sliussarev», festival Dzintarzeme («Amber land») in Ogre, exhibition's tour: Riga, Tallinn, Kaunas
- 1980 — «Alexander Sliussarev», exhibition in ZNUI (Russian: Заочный народный университет искусств)
- 1983 — «Alexander Sliussarev», exhibition in «Soviet Photo» magazine's office, Moscow
- 1984 — «Alexander Sliussarev», Krasnogorsk
- 1987 — «Alexander Sliussarev», Moscow
- 1987 — «Alexander Sliussarev», Yoshkar-Ola
- 1990 — «Alexander Sliussarev», Aix-en-Provence
- 1991 — «Alexander Sliussarev», Amsterdam
- 1994 — «Alexander Sliussarev», Central House of Artist, Moscow
- 1995 — «Alexander Sliussarev», exhibition in the gallery «Fotogalerie», Berlin
- 1995 — «Alexander Sliussarev», gallery «Volga», Kazan
- 1995 — «Alexander Sliussarev», photoClub, Yoshkar-Ola
- 2004 — «Alexander Sliussarev, poSLEDSTVIA», photoprogram «24»
- 2004 — «Alexander Sliussarev» in «Classics of Russian Photography», Moscow House of Photography.
- 2005 — «Impressions», Exposition of two authors – Yedyge Niyazov and Alexander Sliussarev, gallery «Ular», Almaty.
- 2006 — «Alexander Sliussarev, 80s», exposition of B&W square images «Photosoiuz» gallery.
- 2006 — «Alexander Sliussarev, Transdecadens», photogallery «GLAZ».
- 2007 — «Alexander Sliussarev, Everything», photogallery «GLAZ».
- 2009 — «False Magic of B/W», Rosphoto, Sankt-Petersburg. Rappoport, A.G.)
- 2009 — «1 КАРТА 2 МАРШРУТА. Аман Гельд/Александр Слюсарев».
- 2009 — Александр Слюсарев: «Я говорю о простых и понятных вещах...».
- 2010 Александр Слюсарев, Аман Гельд «Одна карта, два маршрута» (Куратор: Марат Гельман), Государственный музей архитектуры им. А. В. Щусева, Москва «Фотобиеннале-2010» (каталог)
- 2010 — Александр Слюсарев «Проходя мимо», Кировский областной художественный музей имени В. М. и А. М. Васнецовых, Киров
- 2012 – Alexander Slusarev, Retrospective. Part 1.)

== Photographs in museums and private collections ==
- The Museum of Modern Art, New York
- Museet for Fotokunst (MFF in Danish) / The Museum of Photographic Art, Odense, Denmark / Музей фотоискусства, Одензе, Дания
- Harry Ransom Center, UT, Austin, USA / Центр гуманитарных исследований Гарри Рансома, Университет штата Техас, Остин, США
- New Mexico Museum of Art, Santa Fe, NM, USA / Музей изобразительных искусств штата Нью-Мехико, Санта-Фе, США
- Московский музей современного искусства
- Московский дом фотографии
- Государственный центр современного искусства
- Музей актуального искусства ART4.RU
- Latvijas Fotogrāfijas muzejs, Rīga, Latvija / Музей фотохудожников Латвии, Рига, Латвия
- Lietuvos fotografijos muziejus, Šiauliai, Lietuva / Музей литовской фотографии, Шауляй, Литва
- коллекция Союз фотохудожников России
- частные коллекции в России и за рубежем

== Bibliography ==
- Alexander Slyusarev: Selected Photographs. Dark Slide Press. 2009.
- Alexander Slyusarev: Selected Color. Dark Slide Press. 2010.
- Слюсарев А. Сюжеты старого города (снимки И. Брухиса) // «Советское фото», No. 1, 1989.
- Слюсарев А. Спурис Эгон, Рука Инта. Двое в одной лодке // «Советское фото», No. 2, 1990.
- Слюсарев А. О Едыге Ниязове «Не переигрывая...» // «Советское фото», No. 4, 1990.
- Слюсарев А. О влияниях и ситуациях // «Советское фото», No. 10, 1990.
- Слюсарев А. Жизнь вокруг Андрейса Грантса // «Советское фото», No. 12, 1990.
- Слюсарев А. Взгляд со стороны (снимки В. Шахлевича) // «Советское фото», No. 2. 1994.
- Слюсарев А. Реконструкция, Фотографический вестник «Ретикуляция» No. 2 1995, стр. 2–3.
- Слюсарев А. Смысловая считываемость (снимки Igor Moukhin) // «Советское фото», No. 1, 1996.
- Слюсарев А. От смыслового содержания к визуальному (снимки Ладейщиков, Михаил Анатольевич) // «Фотография», No. 3, 1997, с. 20–23.

== Publications about Sliussarev ==
- Mrázková, Daniela; Remeš, Vladimír (1 October 1986). Another Russia: Through the eyes of the new Soviet photographers. New York: Facts on File Inc. ISBN 0-8160-1553-8.
- T. Eskola & H. Eerikainen. Toisinnakiat. Helsinki: SN-Kirjiat Publishing, 1988. ISBN 951-615-707-6
- Валерий Стигнеев и Александр Липков. Мир фотографии. М.: Планета, 1989. ISBN 5-85250-117-4
- Eroosio/Erosion. 1980-luvun kasitteelista kuvataidetta ja valokuva Neuvostoliitosta. Edited by Kimmo Sarje. Helsinki: Amos Anderson Publishing, 1990. ISBN 952-9531-03-6
- Photo Manifesto: Contemporary Photography in the USSR. Edited by Christopher Ursitti, Joseph Walker, Aleksandr Nikolaevich Lavrentev and Paul McGinniss. New York: Stewart, Tabori & Chang, 1991. ISBN 1-55670-199-3
- Contemporary Russian Art Photography // Art Journal, ed. Diane Neumaier, College Art Association, Vol. 53, No 2, 1994, New York.
- Hinting at Reality: Aleksandr Slysarev with Mikhail Sidlin // Neumaier, Diane, ed. (2004). Beyond Memory: Soviet Nonconformist Photography and Photo-related Works of Art. Rutgers University Press. pp. 293–308. ISBN 978-0-8135-3454-1.
- Свиблова, Ольга Львовна The Russian Vision on Europe. М.: Novosti, 2005. ISBN 5-93977-022-3 pp. 132–139.
- Эгонс Спурис, буклет «Fotografijas Aleksandra Slusareva(Moskava)» 1979, Ogre
- Раппапорт, Александр Гербертович Время и предмет. Фотографии А.Слюсарева // Советское фото, No. 7, 1987.

== Interviews ==
- Михаил Сидлин «Александр Слюсарев — фотограф теней, бликов и отражений», интервью Nezavisimaya Gazeta, 2004
- Юрий Зеленцов «Беседа с Александром Слюсаревым», Интервью «Photo.Picart», 2007.
- Интервью телеканалу «Радость моя»
- Артём Житенев и Артём Чернов «Рубрика „ЗДЕШНИЕ“. Интервью А. А. Слюсарева» Фотополигон/Photopolygon, 2008
