= Salomón Jaar =

Salomón Jaar Welchez (1962 – 4 April 2010) was the presidential commissioner for Southern Honduras. He had previously served in many positions in the Church of Jesus Christ of Latter-day Saints (LDS Church). He died as a result of chest wounds received in an assault by robbers who waylaid his vehicle in Guatemala on a trip he was taking with his wife and daughter to the LDS Church's Guatemala City Guatemala Temple.

Jaar joined the LDS Church at age 18. He served as a Mormon missionary in Guatemala. He later worked as a coordinator for the Church Educational System.

Jaar was the first president of the LDS Church's Valle de Sula Honduras Stake. He later served as an area seventy and as president of the Honduras Tegucigalpa Mission of the church. He had also served as a bishop in the LDS Church. Jaar was mission president from 1993 to 1996 and an area seventy from 1996 to 2000. At the time of his death he was the bishop of the Tamarindo Ward in the Choluteca Honduras Stake.

Jaar wrote the book Quieres Ser Rico?.
