= Tadeusz Płoski =

Polish military bishop and Major General

The Most Reverend Tadeusz Płoski D.Sc., Ph.D.
- Military Ordinary of the Polish Armed Forces
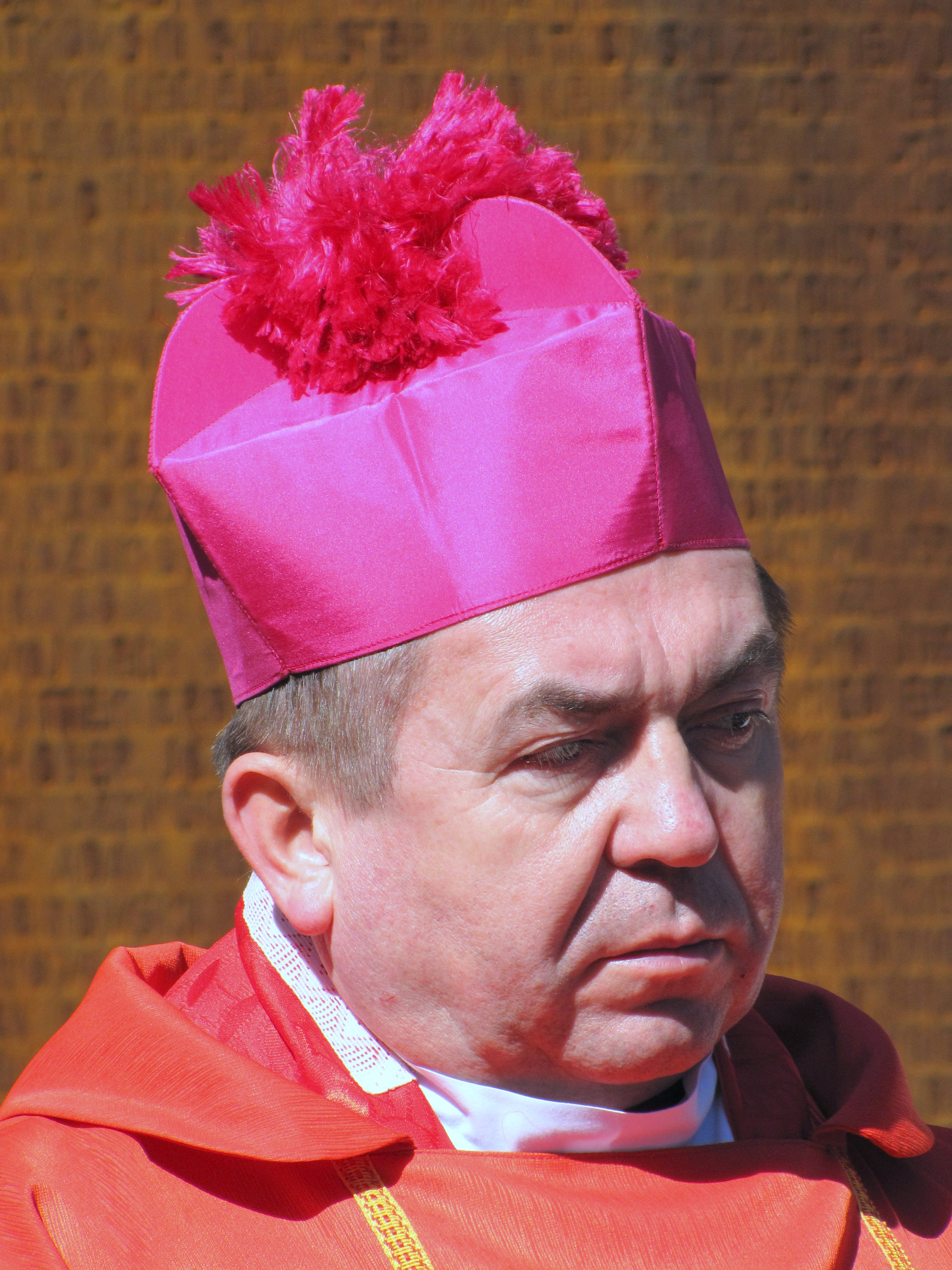
- Bishop Tadeusz Płoski - Katyn (Russia), 10 April 2009
- Predecessor: Sławoj Leszek Głódź
- Successor: Józef Guzdek

Orders
- Ordination: 6 June 1982 (Priest)
- Consecration: 30 October 2004 (Bishop)

Personal details
- Born: 9 March 1956 Lidzbark Warmiński, Poland
- Died: 10 April 2010 (aged 54) Smolensk air base, Russia
- Denomination: Roman Catholic

Tadeusz Płoski (9 March 1956 – 10 April 2010) was a Polish military bishop and Major General. He was born in Lidzbark Warmiński.

He was appointed the Military Ordinary of the Polish Armed Forces, by Pope John Paul II on 16 October 2004. He was ordained a bishop on 30 October 2004. In this role he oversaw the spiritual needs and priests attached to the Polish Forces.

He was listed on the flight manifest of the Tupolev Tu-154 of the 36th Special Aviation Regiment carrying the President of Poland Lech Kaczyński which crashed near Smolensk-North airport near Pechersk near Smolensk, Russia, on 10 April 2010, killing all aboard.

In 2017, it was revealed that when the Polish state reopened the investigation into the crash and exhumed victim's bodies, testing revealed that Archbishop Miron Chodakowski's coffin contained his body from the waist up and the body of Ploski from the waist down. Only half of Ploski's body was found in his own coffin.

== Military Promotions ==
- Captain - 1992
- Major - 1995
- Lieutenant Colonel - 1998
- Colonel - 2000
- Brigadier General - 2004
- Major General - 2006

== Honours and awards ==
- Commander's Cross of the Order of Polonia Restituta - 2010, posthumously; previously awarded the Knight's Cross - 2008
- Gold Cross of Merit - 2007
- Silver Cross of Merit - 1999
- Bronze Medal in the Service of the Armed Forces of the Homeland
- Silver Medal for his contribution to national defence
- Gold Medal of Merit for the Police
- Gold Badge of Merit for the Customs Service - 2010, posthumously
- Commander Missio Reconciliationis
- Medal Pro Memoria
- Badge of Honour "for outstanding services to the League of National Defense"
- Knights of the Order of Virtuti Militari
- Badge "for his contribution to the National Union of Soldiers, Peasants' Battalions"
- Honorary Badge of the Organizational of Merit of the Republic of Pilsudski Polish Association" - 2009
- Grand Officer of the Order of Merit - 2008, Portugal
- Cross of Honour of the Scouting Association of the Republic of Poland - AD amīcum - 2010, posthumously
- Award of Merit for the City of Warsaw - 2010, posthumously
