= Miron Chodakowski =

Archbishop of the Polish Orthodox Church (1957-2010)

His Eminence Miron
- Archbishop of Hajnówka
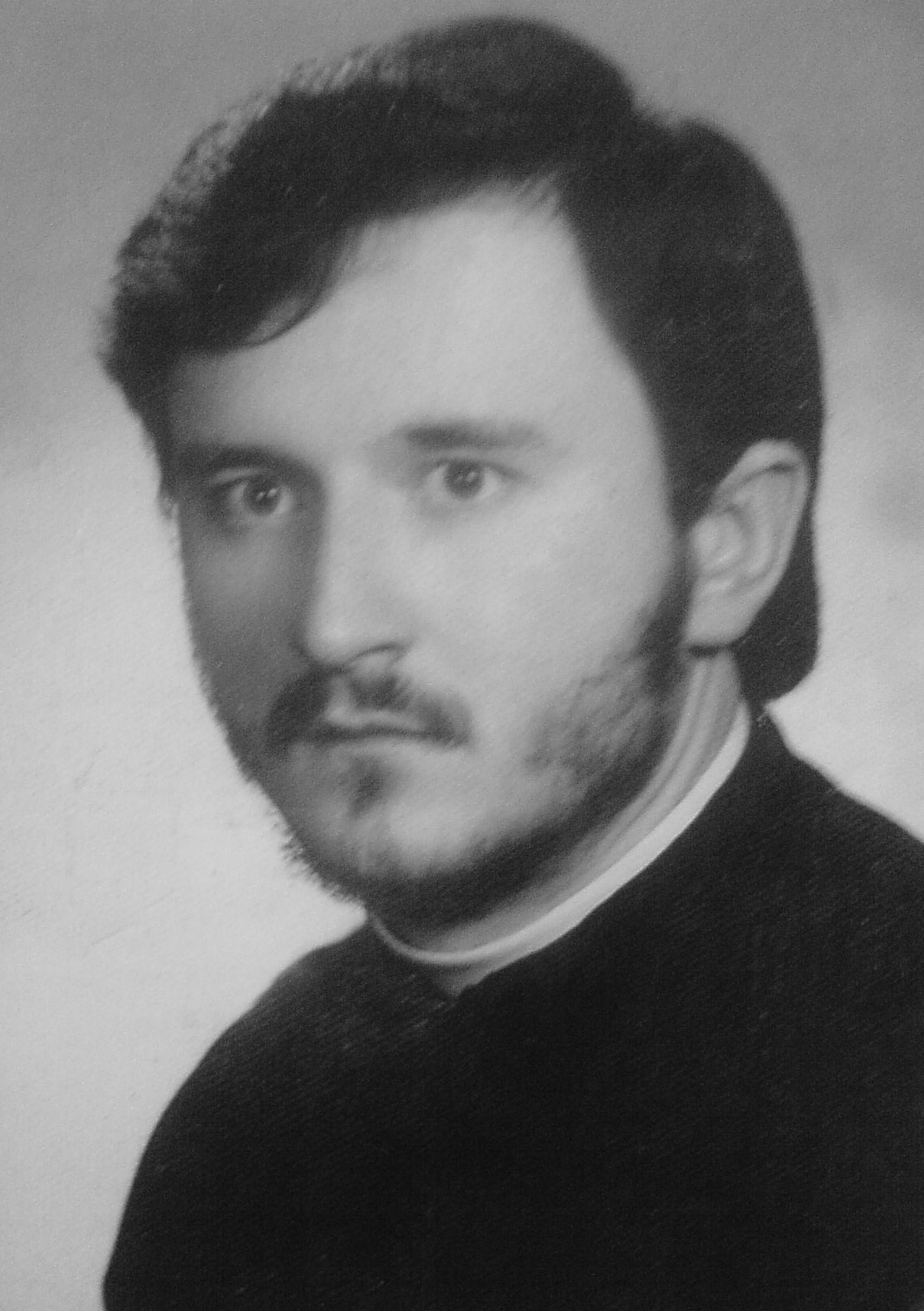
- Church: Polish Orthodox Church
- See: Hajnowka
- Installed: 10 May 1998
- Term ended: 10 April 2010
- Other post: Orthodox Ordinary of the Polish Army (1998–2010)

Orders
- Ordination: 1984
- Consecration: 10 May 1998

Personal details
- Born: Mirosław Chodakowski; 21 October 1957 Białystok, Polish People's Republic
- Died: 10 April 2010 (aged 52) near Smolensk, Russia
- Buried: Supraśl Orthodox Monastery
- Denomination: Eastern Orthodox Christianity

Archbishop Miron (Secular name: Mirosław Chodakowski) (b. 21 October 1957 – d. 10 April 2010) was an Archbishop in the Polish Orthodox Church and the Orthodox Ordinary of the Polish Army.

== Life ==
=== Childhood ===
Chodakowski was born in Bialystok. The future hierarch's grandparents were deeply religious and he even learned Church Slavonic from his grandmother. When Chodakowski was seven years old, his father was killed in an accident. During his childhood and early youth, he was an altar boy at the St. Nicholas Cathedral in Białystok. There he met the Archbishop Nikanor of Bialystok and Gdansk, who directed him to be educated at the seminary.

=== Theological studies ===
In 1972, he entered the Orthodox Theological Seminary in Warsaw, from which he graduated with a high school diploma in 1976. As a student at the seminary, he sang in the choir of the St. Mary Magdalene Cathedral in Warsaw and was a subdeacon of Metropolitan Basil (Doroszkiewicz) of Warsaw and All Poland. He continued his studies at the Higher Orthodox Theological Seminary at St. Onufry's Monastery in Jableczna, from which he graduated in 1978.

=== Monastic life and priestly ministry ===
On 17 December 1978 he was tonsured a ryassophore. On 25 December 1978 he was ordained to the holy deaconate on, and to the holy priesthood on 15 February 1979. In November 1979 he was also tonsured a monk. From 1979 to 1984 he was the superior of the Monastery of St. Onufry in Jabłeczna. At the same time, he worked in the upper classes of the Orthodox seminary located in the monastery as a lecturer in systematic theology.

On 15 June 1984 he was sent to work in the newly established parish of the Annunciation of the Mother of God and St John the Theologian in Supraśl, but on November 25 of the same year he was raised to the dignity of hegumen, and appointed as the superior of the Monastery of the Annunciation of the Most Holy Mother of God. In the monastery he carried out thorough renovation works, significantly contributing to its reconstruction after the destruction of the WWII and to the full reactivation of the Supraśl monastic community in its original form.

On 7 April 1990 he was raised to the dignity of Archimandrite.

=== Episcopacy ===
He was consecrated a bishop on 10 May 1998, becoming a Vicar Bishop of the Diocese of Warsaw-Bielsk with the title Bishop of Hajnówka. He received the gold Order of Merit for the Defence of the Country on 5 February 1999. He was conferred the rank of General Brigadier of the Polish Army by president Aleksander Kwaśniewski.

=== Death ===
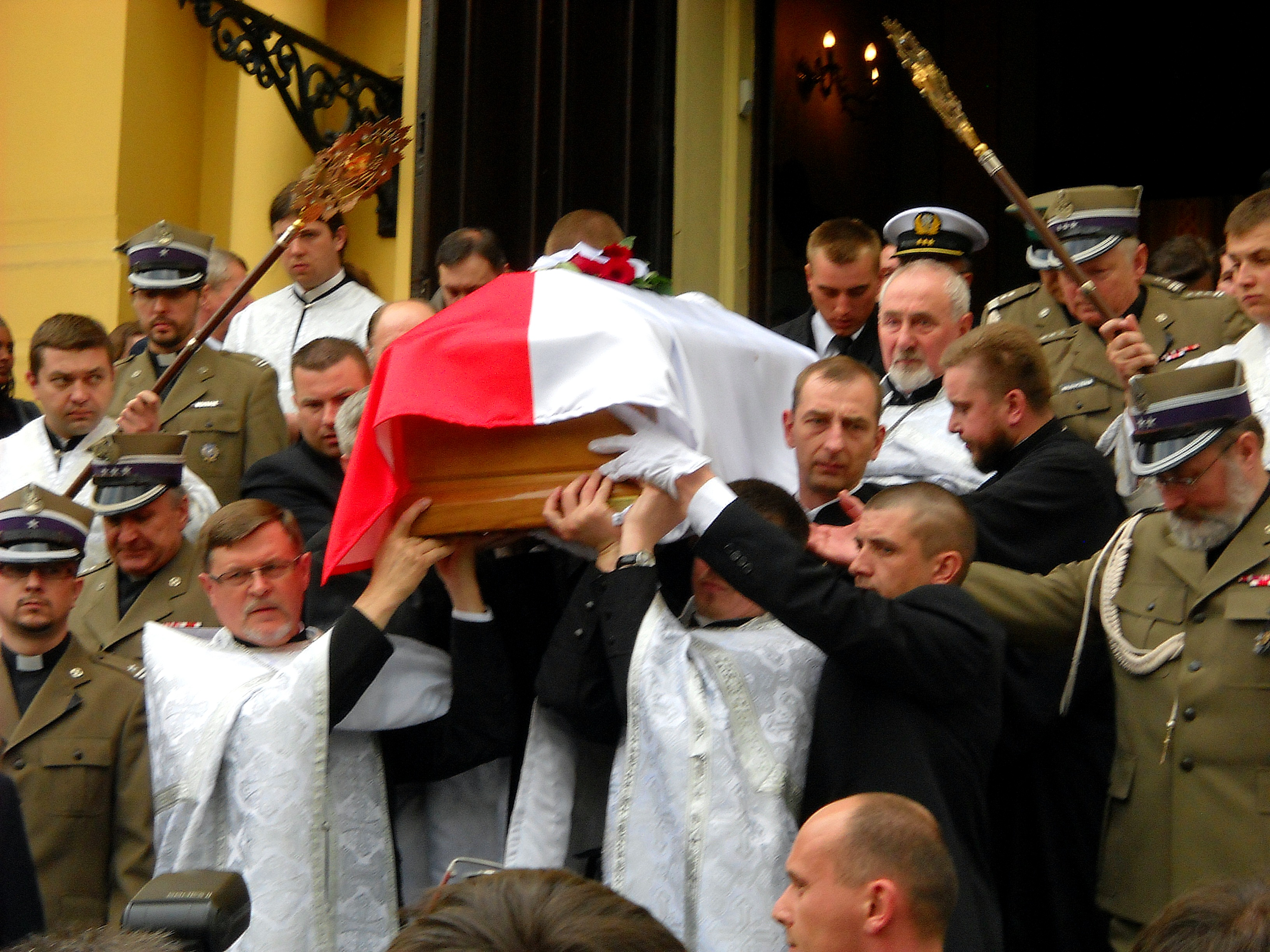
Funeral of Archbishop Miron, Warsaw.

He died in the 2010 Polish Air Force Tu-154 crash on 10 April 2010, with the Polish President and other Polish dignitaries. They were travelling to take part in the commemorations for the 70th anniversary of the Katyn massacre. Chodakowski was posthumously appointed a Commander of the Order of Polonia Restituta. He was also posthumously promoted to the rank of Major General by Bronisław Komorowski.

=== Exhumation ===
In 2017, it was revealed that when the Polish state reopened the investigation into the crash and exhumed victim's bodies, testing revealed that Chodakowski's coffin contained his body from the waist up and the body of general Tadeusz Ploski from the waist down.
