= René Villiger =

Swiss painter (1931–2010)

René Villiger (6 February 1931 – 22 October 2010) was a Swiss painter.

== Life ==
René Villiger
- Born: 6 February 1931; Sins
- Died: 22 October 2010 (aged 79); Cham
- Occupation: Painting

René Villiger was born as the third child of Theodor and Elisabeth Villiger. The siblings were two older brothers, Theo and Marcel.

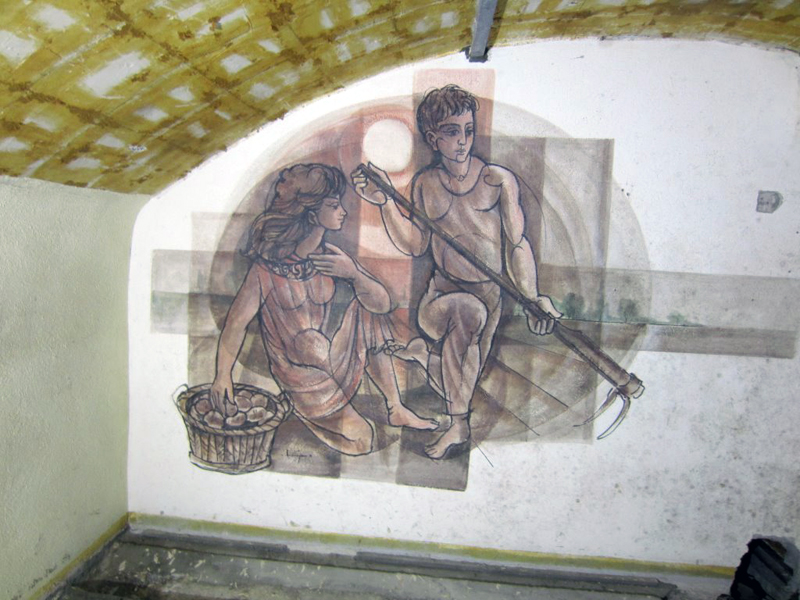

Villiger completed (or in the original text: "suffered") his first school classes in Sins. From 1946 to 1951 he trained as a graphic artist at the Lucerne School of Arts and Crafts. Among his teachers there were the Swiss art greats Max von Moos and Werner Andermatt. Study visits followed, among others in Rome, Paris and Athens.

From 1953 Villiger was an independent graphic artist and painter in his own graphic and advertising office. In 1956 he married his wife Rita, in 1957 their son Beat was born, and in 1960 their daughter Irene. In 1974 the Villigers moved to their own house in Sins.

His illustrations in the soldier's book made him famous during the Cold War.

Villiger admired famous painters such as Pablo Picasso, but he had been directly influenced by his teachers at the School of Applied Arts: he revered Max von Moos until his death. He had taught his students to see the essential and to feel the symbolic power. He had made them aware of the structure of the picture and practiced with them. Villiger had kept these teachings until the end. His second teacher, Werner Andermatt, was also influential in many ways.

From 1977 to 1981, he had trained Daniel Küttel as a graphic artist.

Villiger became an honorary citizen of Sins on 22 August 2005[4] and was honored at the municipal assembly on November 23, 2005.

He died of cancer on 22 October 2010 at the age of 79 in the AndreasKlinik (Hirslanden) in Cham ZG.

The collection of pictures of the artist is accessible in the recruiting center Aarau.
