= Roger-Émile Aubry =

Catholic bishop and Vicar Apostolic of Reyes (1923–2010)

The Most Reverend Roger-Émile Aubry C.Ss.R.
- Vicar Apostolic of Reyes
- Church: Catholic Church
- Diocese: Vicariate Apostolic of Reyes
- Appointed: 14 July 1973
- Installed: 16 September 1973
- Term ended: 1 May 1999

Orders
- Ordination: 24 February 1949
- Consecration: 16 September 1973

Personal details
- Born: April 11, 1923
- Died: February 17, 2010 (aged 86)

Roger-Émile Aubry, C.Ss.R., (11 April 1923 – 17 February 2010) was the Catholic bishop of the Vicariate Apostolic of Reyes, Bolivia.

Ordained to the priesthood on 24 February 1949, Pope Paul VI appointed Aubry bishop of the Reyes vicariate apostolic on 14 July 1973 and he was ordained on 16 September 1973 retiring on 1 May 1999.
