= Yakov Alpert =

Russian-born American physicist (1911–2010)

Yakov Lvovich Alpert
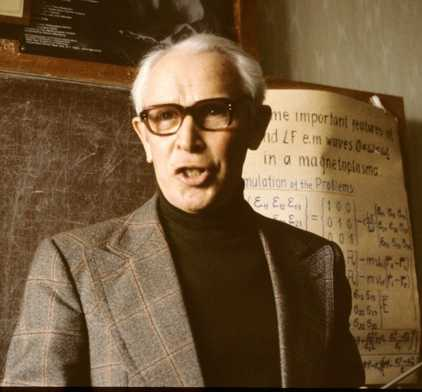
- Yakov Alpert in 1986
- Born: March 1, 1911
- Died: October 5, 2010 (aged 99)

Yakov Lvovich Alpert (Russian: Яков Львович Альперт; March 1, 1911 – October 5, 2010) was a Russian-born American physicist whose principal field of research was space plasma physics.

== Biography ==
He was born in Ivnytsia, a village near Zhytomyr, in the Russian Empire. In 1928 he obtained an excellent grade in the entrance examination for the Ukrainian Polytechnic Institute, but because his father, a commercial traveler, was considered not to be a worker, he was refused admission; instead, he took employment as a carpenter. In 1929 he left Zhitomir for Moscow, where he worked first as a builder's labourer, then as a draughtsman for architectural exhibitions. He was able to get a job as a technician at the Radio Institute of the Ministry of Communications in 1931, and from that time he remained in his chosen field of physics.

During his scientific career in the USSR, Alpert worked from 1931 to 1934 at the Communications Radio Institute; then, from 1935 until 1951 at the Lebedev Physical Institute (FIAN) of the Academy of Sciences; and finally at the Institute of Terrestrial Magnetism, Propagation of Radio Waves, and Ionosphere (IZMIRAN) of the Academy of Sciences, from 1952 until he left the USSR in 1987.

In 1973 he and his wife Svetlana Pivkova decided to emigrate. The first step was to obtain a letter from a relative in Israel, inviting them to settle there; at that time, even non-Jews leaving the Soviet Union could only go to Israel. He requested such a letter through Israel's Academy of Sciences, and in due course received one. Its arrival was noticed by the Soviet authorities, and as was then customary he was demoted at his place of work, in his case to a post of senior scientist with a reduced salary, while she was dismissed from her post (at a different Institute) and could not obtain one elsewhere. In 1975 they were finally permitted to apply for exit visas, but this application was refused, as were 26 other such applications they made during the next 12 years. During this period, he took an active part in a scientific seminar to maintain his skills and those of his fellow “refuseniks”. It was organized by Victor Brailovsky, and the other participants included Alexander Lerner, Yuri Orlov, and Anatoly Sharansky; though not himself a candidate for emigration, Andrei Sakharov often attended the seminar and supported the refuseniks until his exile to Gorky in 1980. Following the arrest of Brailovsky in 1981, these seminars were often held at the Alperts' apartment.

In 1987, the Alperts received their visas and left for the US, where they arrived in 1988 and settled near Boston. For the rest of his professional life he was a Senior Staff Scientist at the Harvard-Smithsonian Center for Astrophysics. He never retired formally, but his last publication under the auspices of the Center for Astrophysics was made in 2001.

== Scientific work ==
Alpert's main scientific interests at the FIAN and the IZMIRAN were

- Propagation of radio waves, particularly natural ones (i.e., "atmospherics") below and within the ionosphere.
- Physical structure of the ionosphere and the magnetosphere, and plasma wave processes in these regions.
- Interaction of moving bodies with a plasma.

Between 1936 and 2001, he had 8 books published in Russian and 11 in English (9 original monographs, 3 second editions), the last one being his autobiography. Also he published about 200 scientific papers in Russian or in English and a dozen popular scientific papers in Russian. Forty-three of them are listed in Web of Science.
