= Roman Bannwart =

Swiss theologian and musician (1919–2010)

Wilhelm "Roman" Bannwart (2 November 1919, in Gossau – 2 April 2010, in Einsiedeln) was a Swiss theologian, priest, and musician.

== Works ==
- Best of Gregorianik, Berlin: Universal Music, 2004
- Instrumentalmusik über die sieben letzten Worte unseres Erlösers am Kreuze. Fassung Vl 1 2 Va Vc, Kassel: Disco-Center, [2000]
- The world of Gregorian chant, Merenberg: Zyx Music, 1996
- Die Botschaft der Mönche – Gregorianische Gesänge, Hamburg: Polygram, 1995
- Der gregorianische Choral zwischen Kirche und Disco, Düsseldorf: Patmos-Verlag, 1995
- Missa in festo Pentecostes, Zurich: Jecklin, 1988
- Musica Unterwaldensis, Zurich: Musikverlag zum Pelikan, 1978
