= Jean Vergnes =

Jean Vergnes (November 29, 1921 – April 22, 2010) was a prominent chef, a co-founder of the famed eatery Le Cirque in the borough of Manhattan in New York City, and an influence on American restaurant culture for more than four decades.

Vergnes was a classically trained French chef. He retired in 1987 after having sold his interest in Le Cirque though he still acted as a consultant to other restaurants.
