= Ambrose D'Mello =

Indian Jesuit priest (1922–2010)

Ambrose D'Mello (20 January 1922 – 18 April 2010) was an Indian Jesuit priest, who served as the first Jesuit Provincial of India.

D'Mello was born in Puthur, Mangalore, British India in 1922. He entered the noviciate of the Society of Jesus 18 November 1943 and was ordained priest on 21 November 1954.

When the office of Provincial of India was established by the Jesuit Superior General in view of better coordinating the multifarious activities of the Society of Jesus in South-Asia, Ambrose D'Mello served as its first incumbent. The Jesuit Provincial of India has since been renamed the Jesuit Provincial of South Asia.

Earlier, while provincial of the Jesuits of Karnataka he had inaugurated Jesuit missionary work in Nagaland, a North-Eastern state of India. Much appreciated for his leadership skills, he has been also for some time the superior of the Jesuits working in the Darjeeling region.

He also founded the Jesuit's Anekal mission in Karnataka state, which supports literacy programs, development work, and housing programs for the region's tribal and dalit people.

Ambrsoe D'Mello died of cancer on 18 April 2010, in Guwahati, Assam, at the age of 87.
