= Luis Antonio Chávez =

Luis Antonio Chavez (died April 13, 2010) was a Honduran journalist and host of a children's radio program.

== Information ==
Chavez was shot and killed on April 13, 2010, aged 22, becoming the sixth Honduran journalist to be killed in the country since March 1, 2010.
