= Peter-Josef Schallberger =

Swiss politician

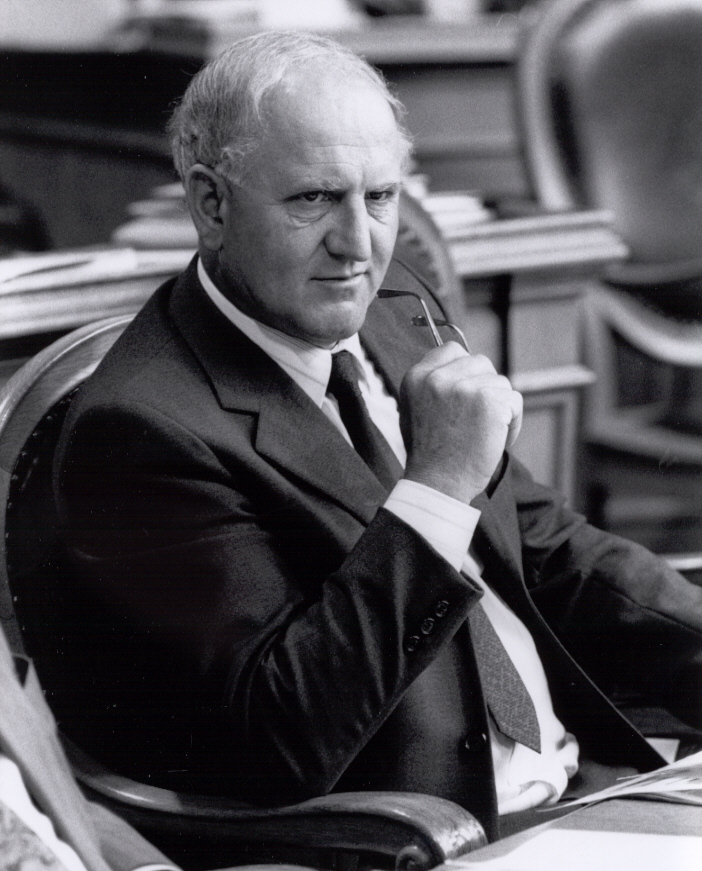
Peter Josef Schallberger (1990)

Peter-Josef Schallberger (19 July 1932; Ennetmoos – 15 April 2010) was a Swiss politician of the CVP and farmer.

== Life ==
Schallberger was the son of Eduard Schallberger, the mayor of Ennetmoos. He attended the agricultural school in Altdorf. In 1959 he took over his father's farm in Rotzberg. Since 1960, he was active in politics.
