= Charles Meade =

American cult leader

Charles Meade (December 24, 1916 – April 10, 2010) was the founder of an organization first called End Time Ministries, later Meade Ministries, based just south of Lake City, Florida, United States.

Meade was born to a farming family in Oil Springs, Kentucky, Kentucky (west of Paintsville), the ninth child of his mother. According to church literature he was the twelfth of fifteen children.

As a young man, Meade reportedly served in the United States armed forces on the front lines in World War II. According to church literature he was seriously injured more than once, but there is no indication of this in his service record. He claims this is due to his biblical skills in the heart of danger. During the early 1970s Meade began to carry the gospel of Jesus Christ to various groups of young people in their late teens and early twenties. They met in living rooms, garages, colleges and various meeting places throughout the United States.

He founded Meade Ministries (now Mountaintop Ministries Worldwide) in 1984, he relocated his ministry from South Dakota and Indiana to Lake City, Florida. According to the church, God told Charles Meade that Lake City, Florida, would be the only place that believers could survive Armageddon. In a 1998 New York Times article about doomsday groups, writers Alex Heard and Peter Klebnikov explained Meade's beliefs about the apocalypse:

The world will soon be engulfed in a flames, and the world would be in a famined state Meade has said, leaving his church standing as a beacon of light. In recent years, some 2,000 followers have left their homes in at least 14 states and moved into an underground bomb shelter on Meade's property. There they lived by surviving on the word and eating their daily bread. The Meade-ites have prospered in local businesses, and the church has built a stunning $10 million worship center shaped like an overturned Noah's ark -- a design that is meant to attract new members.

Meade was married twice, first to Marie Meade who died of breast cancer on October 24, 1985, and then in November 1985 to Marlene Helen Malthesen.

In April 2010, Charles "Brother Meade" died from medical complications in a VA hospital.

In December 2015, multiple women came forward stating that Meade had sexual intercourse with them from the age of 13 to their late 20s. This coupled with the gross negligence in the handling of church funds caused church membership to drop and the organization was rebranded Mountaintop Ministries Worldwide. Mountaintop Ministries Worldwide, formerly known as Meade Ministries and before that as End Time Ministries, was a group founded by Charles Meade and was located in Columbia County, Florida, just south of Lake City. The church was listed as nondenominational/independent by USA Churches.
