= Cristina Corrales =

Bolivian journalist (1962–2010)

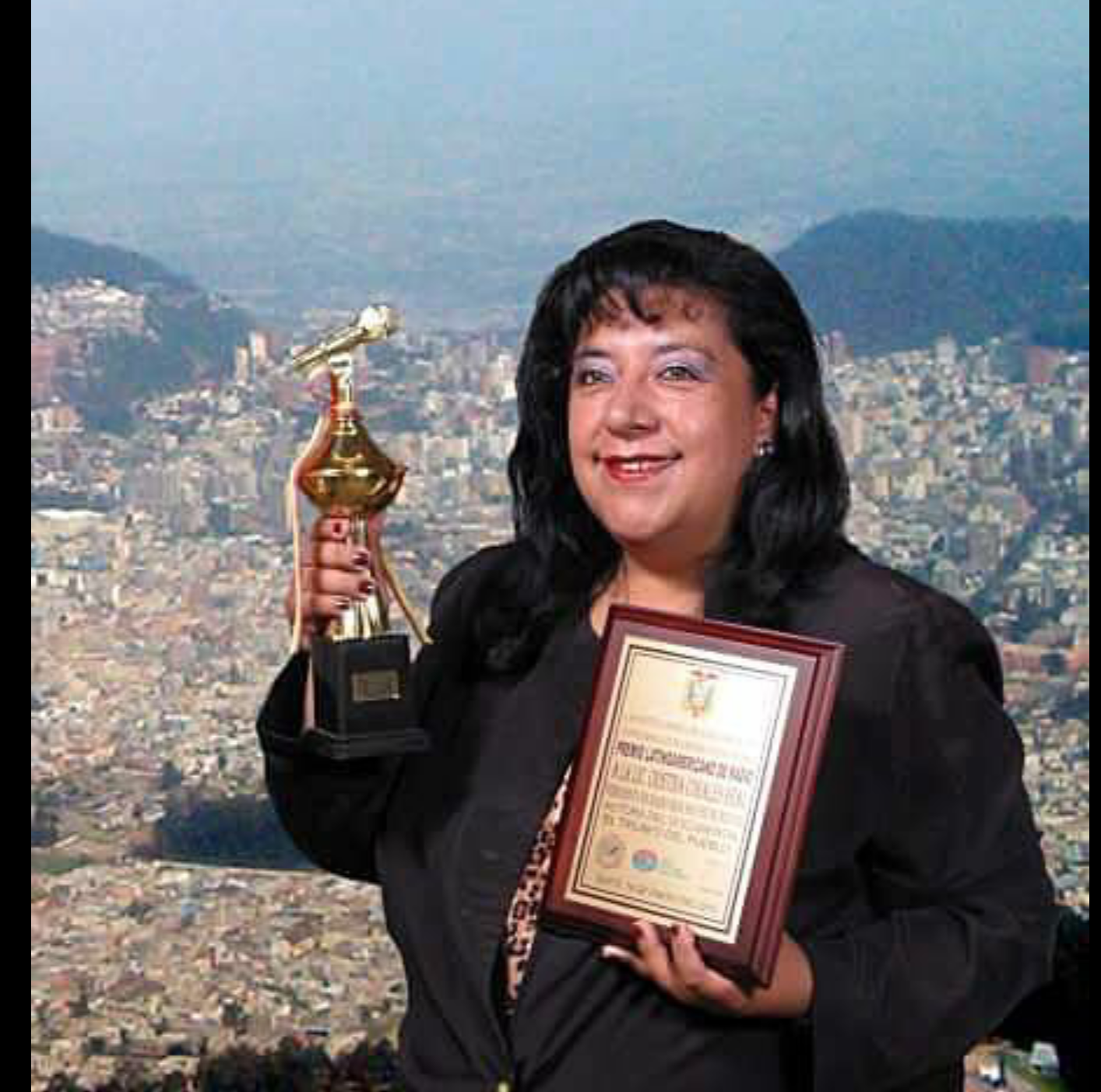

Member of the Municipal Council of La Paz
- In office 1999–2005

Personal details
- Born: Cristina Corrales Real; 5 December 1962 La Paz, Bolivia
- Died: 30 April 2010 (aged 47) La Paz, Bolivia
- Party: Vanguardia Revolucionaria 9 de Abril
- Occupation: Journalist, radio broadcaster, politician

Cristina Corrales Real (5 December 1962 – 30 April 2010) was a Bolivian journalist, radio broadcaster, and politician.

== Professional career ==
=== Radio ===
Cristina Corrales began her professional career at Radio Cristal, a station that was home to influential broadcasters such as Lorenzo Carri. There she worked alongside Mario Espinoza and Carlos Mesa.

Subsequently, she worked at Radio Panamericana, then became the star announcer of Radio Fides with her program Cristina y usted (Cristina and You) in the late 1980s. She was the initiator of the station's social direction, hosting the morning program that gained a large audience after its first broadcast on 4 April 1988. This contributed to the popularity of Radio Fides, and brought about a rivalry between it and Metropolitan Radio, headed by Carlos Palenque.

The program came to have some of the highest ratings in the cities of La Paz and El Alto. It began as a show with a news magazine format and then became a citizens' forum similar to Palenque's program Tribuna Libre.

At Fides, Corrales founded the Christmas campaign "Por la sonrisa de un niño" (For a Child's Smile), co-organized by her colleague, the Bolivian Catholic priest and journalist Eduardo Pérez Iribarne.

=== Television ===
Later she ventured into television with the program Crónicas on Canal 7. She also worked at PAT as press manager, and then at Bolivisión with her program Cristina y Usted. Corrales characterized her career as that of a journalist who covered all the current events.

=== Documentary about the Constituent Assembly ===
Corrales was the only journalist who made a daily record of the sessions during the Bolivian Constituent Assembly held in Sucre, a city to which she moved after leaving politics and facing adversity when she tried to return to the media in La Paz. The recording of these sessions allowed her to make the documentary El Triunfo del pueblo (The Triumph of the People), recognized in 2009 with the Latin American Radio Award in Ecuador. She traveled to Quito in 2010 to receive the honor.

== Political career ==
The local and national popularity that she obtained with her radio program prompted Corrales to present her candidacy for the Municipal Council of La Paz for the Vanguardia Revolucionaria 9 de Abril (VR-9) party. She was elected councilor, serving from 1999 to 2005, and was the body's president from 2000 to 2005. During her term, she carried out various investigations on the transparency of contracts and collections made by companies contracted by the mayor's office. In 2000, she received King Juan Carlos and Queen Sofía of Spain of Spain in the City Hall of La Paz, as well as other international visitors such as Hugo Chávez and Kofi Annan.

Corrales was briefly a candidate for Senate – as well as Chamber of Deputies, simultaneously – on behalf of the Revolutionary Left Movement (MIR) in the 2002 elections but chose not to compete as it would have required her to resign from the municipal council.

== Personal life ==
Cristina Corrales married the left-wing ideologue and Conscience of Fatherland party (CONDEPA) politician Gonzalo Ruiz Paz, with whom she had two children.

She died at the Rengel Clinic in La Paz on 30 April 2010, after suffering from a bronchoaspiration.

== Awards and distinctions ==
- 1990: Prix Futura World Radio Award, Berlin
- 1999: Maya Award for best radio announcer
- 2000: Maya Award for best Bolivian councilor
- 2010: Latin American Radio Award given by Simón Bolívar Andean University, Radio Nacional de España, and Radio Netherland
- 2010: Prócer Pedro Domingo Murillo Award (posthumous)
- 2011: An avenue in the Koani and Achumani areas of La Paz was designated in her honor, marked with a commemorative plaque
