= Andrzej Przewoźnik =

Polish historian (1963–2010)

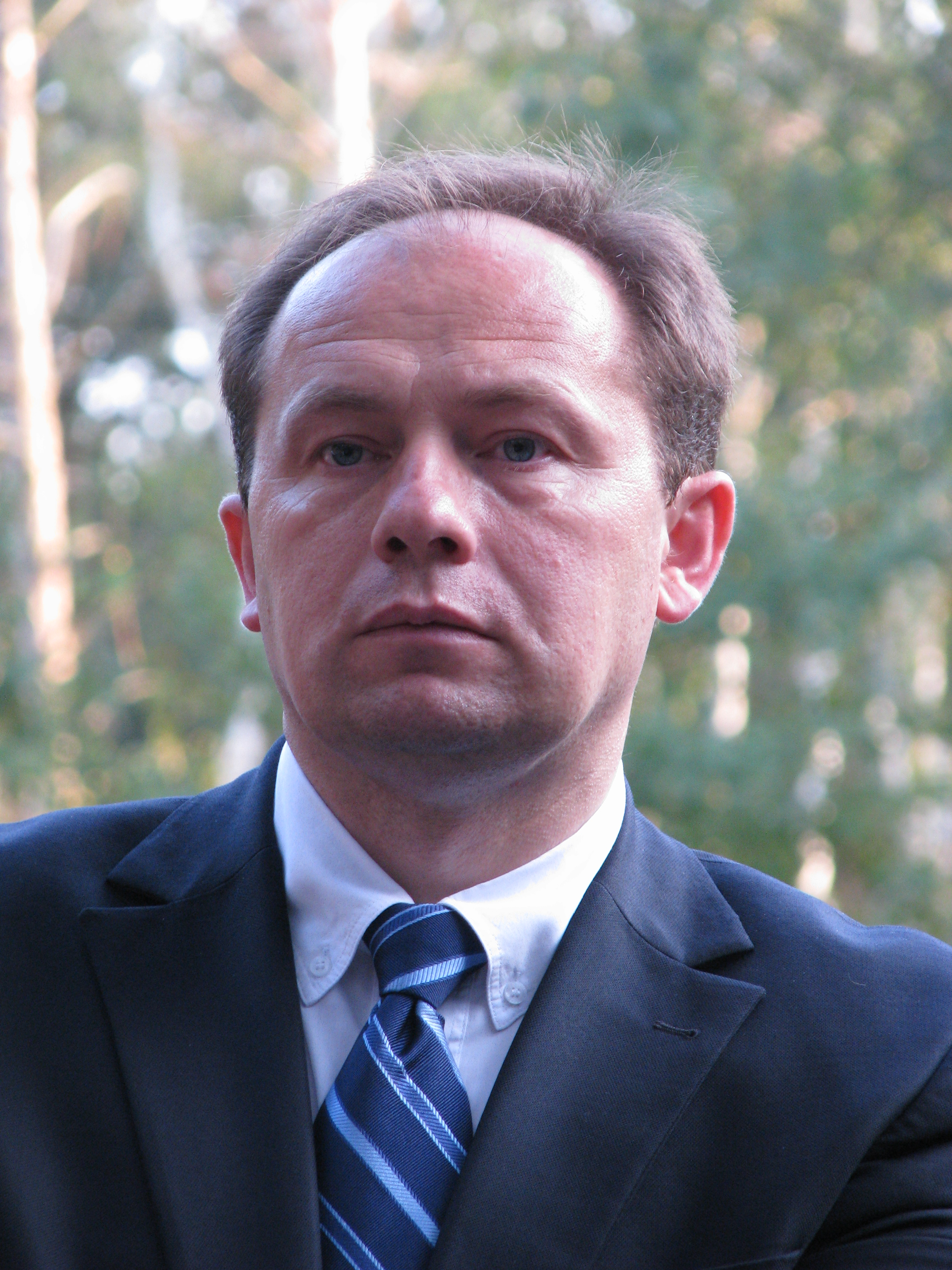
- Andrzej Przewoźnik at Palmiry in 2009
- Born: 13 May 1963; Palmiry, Poland
- Died: 10 April 2010 (aged 46); Russia, near Smolensk
- Occupation: historian
- Awards: Order of Polonia Restituta (post mortem) Order of Polonia Restituta Milito Pro Christo Złoty Medal Gloria Artis Order of St. Gregory the Great Order of Merit

Andrzej Przewoźnik (13 May 1963 – 10 April 2010) was a Polish historian who served as Secretary of the Council for the Protection of Struggle and Martyrdom Sites. He died in the 2010 Polish Air Force Tu-154 crash near the city of Smolensk, Russia.

Przewoźnik was listed on the flight manifest of the plane which belonged to the 36th Special Aviation Regiment carrying the President of Poland Lech Kaczyński. The plane crashed at the Smolensk-North airport in Pechersk, near Smolensk, on 10 April 2010, killing all on board.

== Awards ==
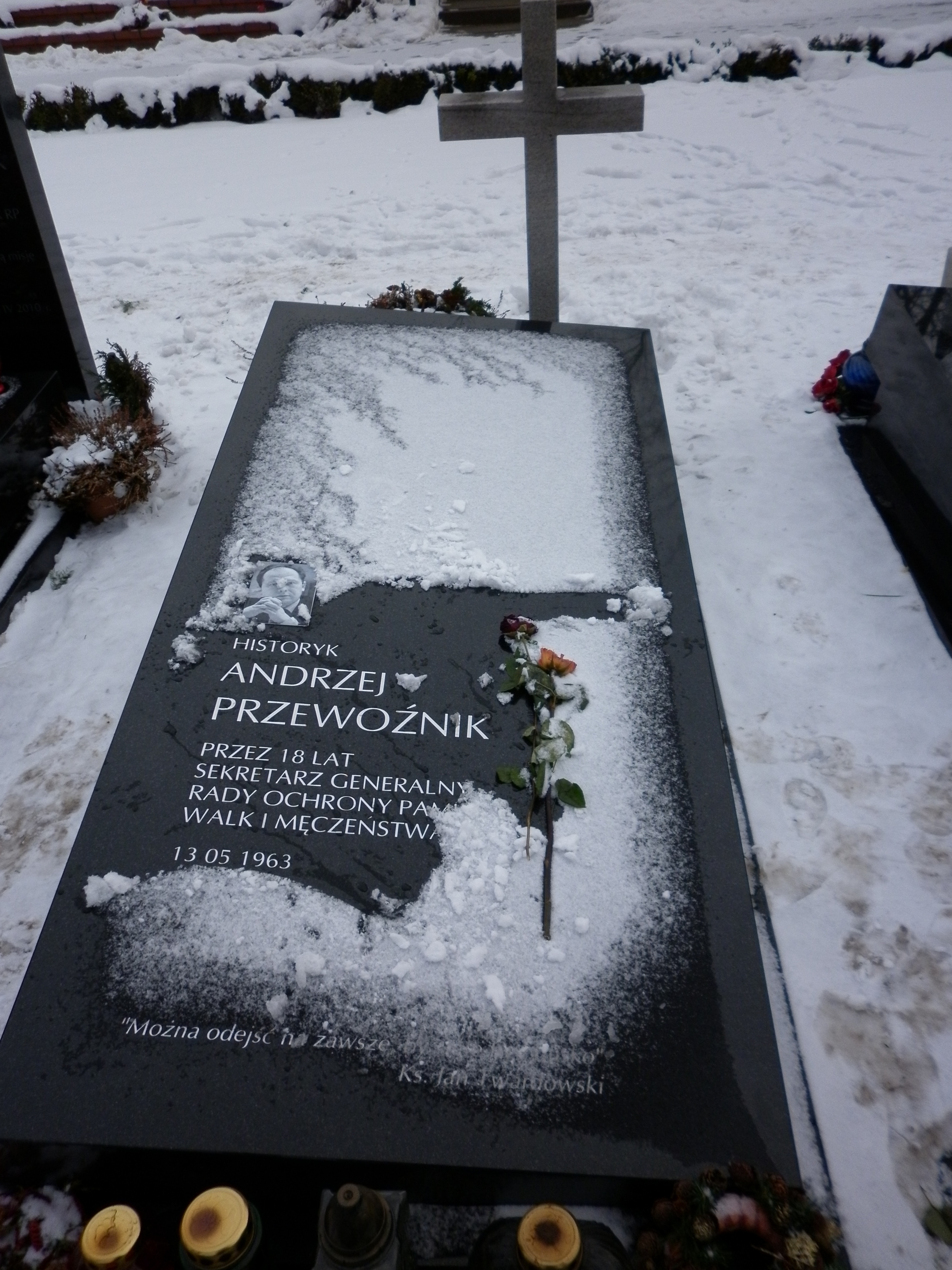
Andrzej Przewoźnik tomb in Powązki

- Grand Cross of the Order of Polonia Restituta (2010, posthumously; previously awarded the Officer's Cross)
- Gloria Artis Gold Medal (2010, posthumous)
- Commander's Cross of the Order of St. Gregory the Great
- Officer's Cross of the Order of Merit of the Republic of Hungary
- Silver Cross of the Polish Combatants Association in London
- Order of Friendship (Russia)
- Medal Milito Pro Christo (2001)
- Diploma "Benemerenti", given by the Bishop Field Army Maj.-Gen. Sławoj Leszek (2001)
