= Smolensk air disaster =

2010 aviation accident in Russia

Smolensk air disaster Polish Air Force Flight PLF 101
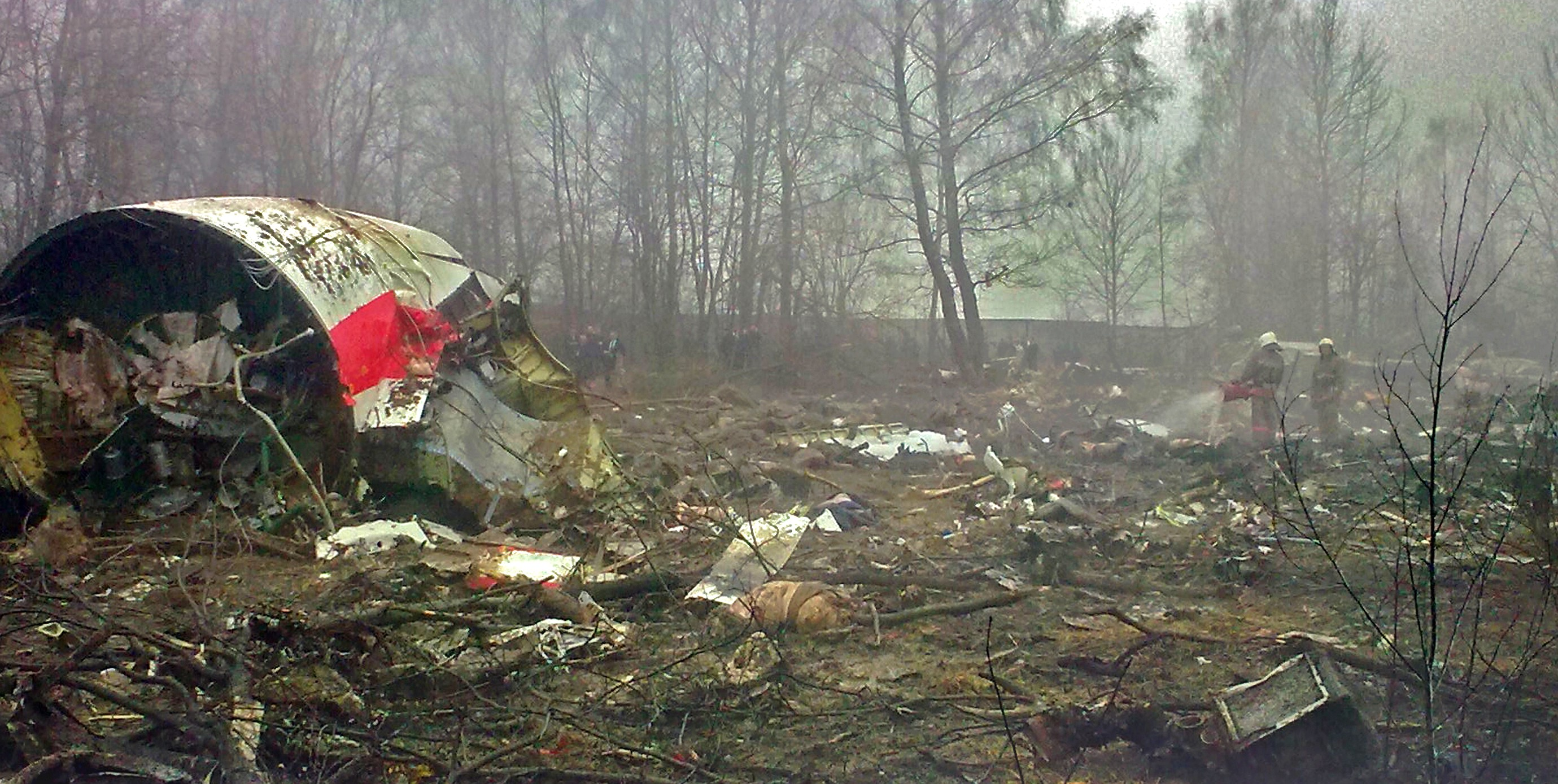
- Wreckage of the aircraft

Accident
- Date: 10 April 2010
- Summary: Controlled flight into terrain
- Site: near Smolensk North Airport Smolensk, Russia; 54°49′26″N 32°03′05″E

Aircraft
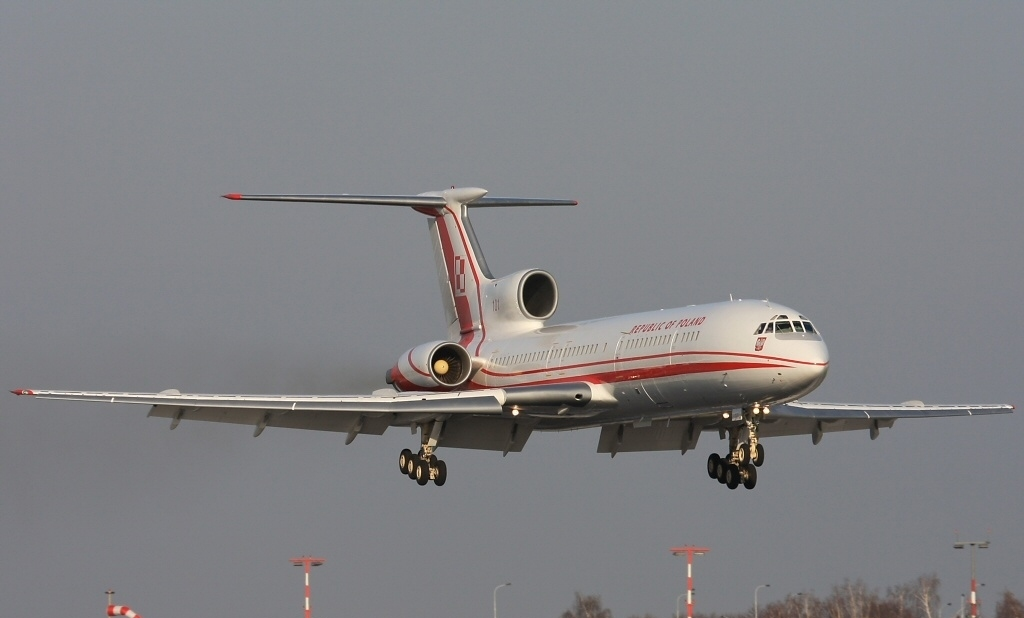
- 101, the aircraft involved, pictured two days before the accident
- Aircraft type: Tupolev Tu-154M
- Operator: 36 SPLT, Polish Air Force
- ICAO flight No.: PLF101
- Call sign: POLISH 101
- Registration: 101
- Flight origin: Frédéric Chopin Airport; Warsaw, Poland
- Destination: Smolensk North Airport; Smolensk, Russia
- Occupants: 96
- Passengers: 89
- Crew: 7
- Fatalities: 96
- Survivors: 0

On 10 April 2010, a Tupolev Tu-154 aircraft operating as Polish Air Force Flight PLF 101, crashed near the Russian city of Smolensk, killing all 96 people on board. Among the victims were the president of Poland, Lech Kaczyński, and a number of senior Polish military officers, Polish government officials, and members of the Polish clergy, as well as relatives of victims of the Katyn massacre. The group was arriving from Warsaw to attend an event commemorating the 70th anniversary of the massacre.

The pilots were attempting to land at Smolensk North Airport in fog, with visibility reduced to about 400 metres (1,300 ft). The aircraft descended far below the normal approach path until it struck trees, rolled, inverted and crashed into the ground, coming to rest in a wooded area a short distance from the runway. Both the Russian and Polish official investigations found no technical faults with the aircraft, and concluded that the crew failed to conduct the approach in a safe manner in the given weather conditions. The Polish authorities found serious deficiencies in the organisation and training of the Air Force unit involved, which was subsequently disbanded. Several high-ranking members of the Polish military resigned following pressure from politicians and the media.

Various conspiracy theories have been circulated alleging that the plane had been deliberately brought down by the Russians in an act of political assassination, and that the 2011 investigations constituted a cover-up and that the Polish government of the time — primarily controlled by the Civic Platform party as opposed to Lech Kaczyński's Law and Justice party (PiS) — was complicit in or aware of the plot, or at least aided in the efforts to cover it up. These conspiracy theories are regularly promoted by PiS, particularly by party leader Jarosław Kaczyński (twin brother of Lech Kaczyński) and deputy party leader Antoni Macierewicz. Following PiS's return to government, a new investigation was opened into the disaster, chaired by Macierewicz; its 2022 conclusion alleged a Russian plot. The new report did not produce any evidence that could conclusively challenge the findings of the 2011 reports, was later indicated to have been the subject of tampered evidence, and was revoked in December 2023.

== Background ==
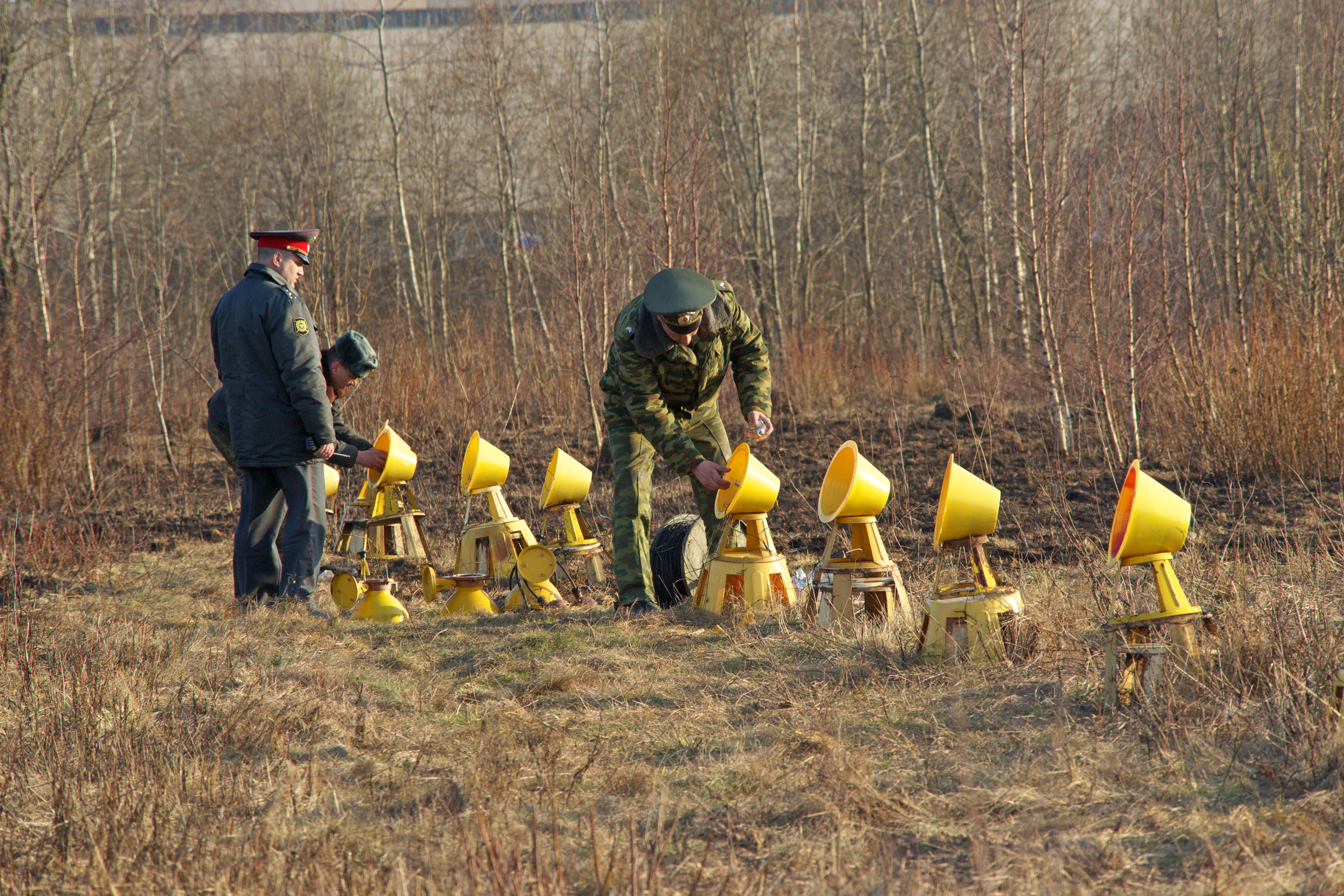
Russian servicemen, accompanied by a policeman, twist bulbs into the approach lights of Smolensk North Airport's runway, hours after the crash of the Tu-154

The flight was taking many high-ranking Polish officials to ceremonies marking the 70th anniversary of the Katyn massacre, a mass murder of Polish intellectuals, politicians, and military officers by the Soviets during World War II. The site of the massacre is approximately 19 km (12 mi) west of Smolensk.

Smolensk North Airport is a former military airbase, presently in mixed military-civilian use. At the time of the crash, the airport was not equipped with an ICAO-compliant instrument landing system (ILS), the standard system used in most developed countries. The Polish Tu-154 was modified to use a Western-style ILS. A non-directional beacon (NDB) was installed at the airport, but such a device can be used only for non-precision approaches, where it can guide the pilot to align with the runway, but offers no vertical guidance on how to descend towards the runway. The airport was equipped also with both a surveillance and landing radar. The lowest approved visibility conditions to land (approach minimums) were cloud base 100 metres (330 ft) and visibility 1,000 metres (3,300 ft). The ground visual navigation aids on 10 April 2010 were not effective. According to the Polish report, the radar was unstable and swung within ±10%. The report from the inspection flight performed on 15 April 2010 stated that the approach lamps, depending on their location and on the altitude of an inbound aircraft, can be obscured by surrounding trees and shrubs when an aircraft is at a distance of 400, 700, and 800 metres from Runway 26. The lamps of the first group (900 m) had their light filters shattered and, of three bulbs installed, only one was serviceable.

The aircraft used the callsign Polish Airforce 101, operating flight PLF101. PLF is the ICAO three-letter designator for the Polish Air Force, used to identify the operator of an aircraft by air traffic control. The aircraft was a Tupolev Tu-154M of the 36th Special Aviation Regiment of the Polish Air Force (Siły Powietrzne), tail number 101. Built in 1990 at the Kuybyshev Aviation Plant as msn 90A837, it first flew on 29 June 1990. At the time of the accident, the airframe had accumulated more than 5,150 hours in 4,000 cycles. The service life of the Tu-154M is more than 25 years or 30,000 hours or 15,000 cycles (whichever comes first). All three Soloviev D-30KU-154 engines were within the service limits of 24,000 hours or 11,100 cycles.

101 was one of two Tupolev Tu-154s that served as official government jets; the other with a tail number of 102 was a year younger and at the time of the accident it was being overhauled in the Aviakor aviation plant in Samara. The 101 aircraft had undergone a major overhaul in December 2009, and Alexey Gusev, the head of the maintenance plant that carried out the work, told Polish TV that it should not have had technical problems. The crash happened 138 flight-hours after the most recent overhaul.

The cockpit crew of Flight 101 consisted of pilot Captain Arkadiusz Protasiuk, 36, co-pilot Major Robert Grzywna, 36, navigator Lieutenant Artur Ziętek, 32, and flight engineer WO2 Andrzej Michalak. Protasiuk had landed at Smolensk three days earlier on 7 April in the same Tu-154; he served as first officer on that flight. Protasiuk had 3,531 flight hours, including 2,906 hours on the Tu-154. Co-pilot Grzywna had 1,909 hours, with 475 of them on the Tu-154. Ziętek had 1,050 hours, only 58 of them on the Tu-154. Michalak had only 329 flight hours, all on the Tu-154.

== Flight sequence ==
=== Take-off and cruise ===
Map of the origin and destination of the accident flight

Flight PLF101 took off from Warsaw at 9:27 Smolensk time after a delay of 27 minutes.

As the aircraft left Warsaw, weather conditions were rapidly deteriorating at Smolensk. A temperature inversion had developed, trapping moisture low in the atmosphere and causing a dense fog to develop. At 9:15 Smolensk time, about an hour and a half before the crash, a Yakovlev Yak-40 jet (flight PLF 031) also belonging to the Polish government and carrying Polish journalists from the President's press pool landed at the airbase without incident, though conditions were rapidly worsening at the time. Shortly thereafter, between 9:20 and 9:39 MSD, a Russian Ilyushin Il-76 (tail number 78817) made two attempts to land, but because of low visibility, it diverted to Vnukovo Airport near Moscow. Upon PLF101's approach to the base, atmospheric conditions continued to worsen, and the fog continued to thicken, further reducing visibility to 400 metres (1,300 ft). The ground control personnel stated to PLF101 that there were no conditions for landing. The Captain then requested and was given permission to conduct a "trial" approach. The controllers instructed the captain as to the landing minimum of 100 metres (330 ft), to which the captain replied, "Yes, sir!"

=== Stress and workload factors ===
Meanwhile, the situation in the cockpit was one of very high stress. As the weather continued to worsen, the crew became increasingly aware of the extreme difficulty they would encounter in landing at Smolensk. The crew may have feared a negative reaction from their passengers should they have to divert to an alternative airfield. The protocol director, Izabela Tomaszewska, was present in the cockpit from time to time, and the Commander-in-Chief of the Polish Air Force was present in the cockpit for the final approach phase of the flight, including the crash itself. At one point, the navigator is heard on the CVR saying "He'll go crazy", a possible reference to the president of Poland, should the crew choose to divert. There may also have been some friction between the Air Force Commander and the captain, caused by an absence in the latter of condition training.

The captain and first officer's decision making may have also been affected by knowledge of a 2008 flight when the president of Poland ordered a change in destination right before departure and again while airborne. The captain and first officer had been the first officer and navigator, respectively, on that flight. Lacking charts or a flight plan for the new destination, the captain of that flight had decided he could not bring the aircraft to the new destination safely. Disobeying the president and a high-ranking Polish Air Force commander on board, the captain flew on to the originally planned destination. The Polish prosecutor's office would later clear that captain of any wrongdoing in relation to that flight, and he was even awarded a silver medal of merit for national defence. However, in the final report issued by The Interstate Aviation Committee (Russian: Межгосударственный авиационный комитет, abbr. МАК)—a supervising body overseeing the use and management of civil aviation in the Commonwealth of Independent States (CIS)—it was stated he had not been assigned to fly the President again since. Polish sources state he flew the President to New York in September 2008, despite objections voiced by the president. The captain involved in the 2008 incident flew the Polish prime minister to Smolensk on 7 April without the president on board, but he was removed from the crew of the 10 April flight which carried the president. Knowledge of the 2008 incident and its repercussions may have weighed on the crew of PLF101, potentially placing additional pressure on them to complete their flight to the original destination.

Complicating the situation was the increased workload on the captain. Normally, one pilot flies the aeroplane while another crew member handles radio communications. On Flight 101, the responsibility for communication usually rests with the navigator. At Smolensk however the situation was different. As the airport is not usually open for international flights and is not ICAO certified, the air traffic controllers were not required to be fluent in English, the ICAO standard language for air traffic control (ATC) communication. Accordingly, all communication between Smolensk's ATC and Flight 101 was carried out in Russian. Russian law requires international flights landing at military airports to have a Russian "leaderman" (navigator; Russian: лидировщик, romanized: lidiróvščik) on board the flight, who is then responsible for this ATC communication, done in Russian. In the middle of March, as part of their request for permission to conduct the flight, Poland asked for leaderman services and the latest airport data for Smolensk. At the end of March, after apparently having received no reply to their first request, Poland tendered a second request for permission to fly, but did not request leaderman services in this second request. As a spokesperson for the Air Force Command said: "The Russian side has not confirmed readiness to secure the flight leader". According to the Final Report, however, Russia did offer leaderman services, but Poland refused, stating their crew had satisfactory knowledge of Russian and could conduct the flight without a leaderman. In reality, the captain was the only member of the crew who could speak Russian adequately. Accordingly, upon being handed off—transferred—to Smolensk ATC, the captain took over communication duties from the navigator. In a normal situation, this would dictate that the first officer be the pilot flying the aeroplane, but as the weather was bad, the captain, as the most experienced member of the crew, elected to fly the aeroplane as well. Thus, the captain was simultaneously performing two tasks that would normally be split up, dividing his attention and increasing his workload.

=== Approach ===
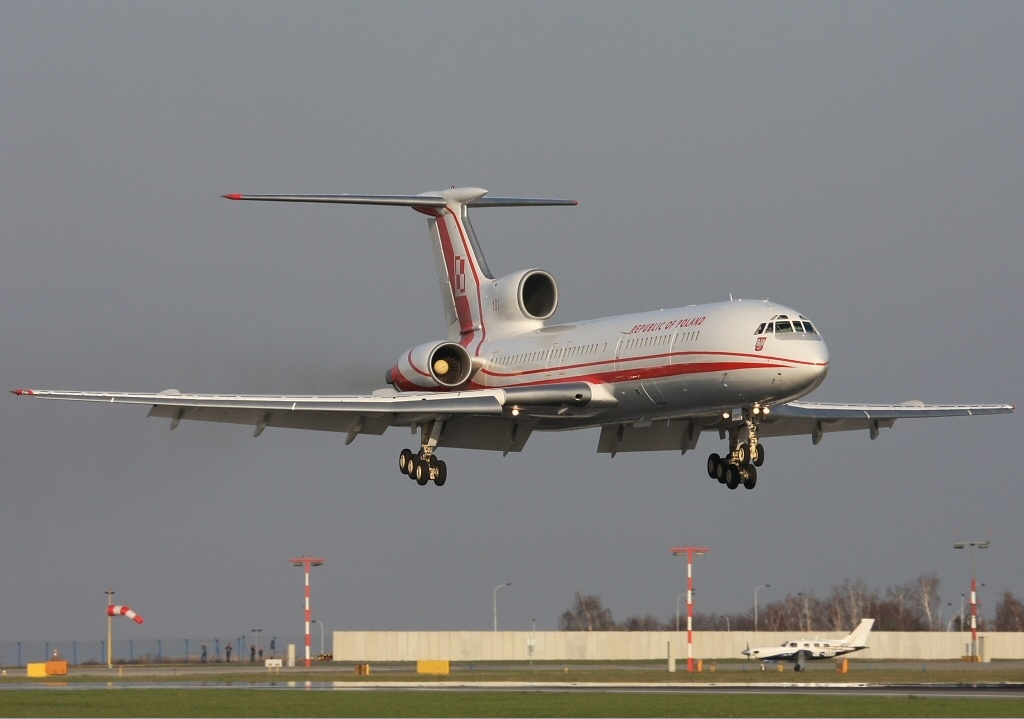
101 landing at Prague Airport less than two days before the accident

Under these stresses, the crew continued their approach pattern and readied the aircraft for final descent. Radios were tuned to the two non-directional beacons (NDBs) present at the field, and the autopilot was set up to use waypoints from the flight management system (FMS) units for navigation. The crew used their second radio to contact the Yak-40 which had landed earlier, inquiring as to the weather conditions. The Yak-40 crew replied, "Well, generally it's absolute shit here," and that, "(we) were lucky to land at the last moment." The Yak-40 crew estimated visibility was 200 metres (660 ft), but told PLF101, "you might try...(to make an approach)." The crew of PLF 101 acknowledged this information and continued their approach. As the aircraft approached the outer marker, the crew issued pitch commands (via the CLIMB-DESCEND wheel) to the autopilot. This is not recommended for the Tu-154, as the autopilot cannot maintain vertical speed accurately enough for the approach phase of flight; manual flight mode is instead recommended. Although the crew had not requested it, the radar controller began issuing reports to Flight 101 concerning their distance from the runway and whether or not they were on the glidepath. The Polish report noted that on multiple occasions the radar controller stated the aeroplane was on the glidepath when it was not.

The terrain awareness and warning system (TAWS) fired its first audible warning "terrain ahead!" at 10:40:06. This was because the Smolensk airport, as a former military airfield not open to international flights, was not in the system's database and therefore the system did not recognise that the aeroplane was approaching an airport. Six seconds later, someone (most likely the captain or navigator) pressed a button on the captain's FMS panel commanding standard barometric pressure be set on the captain's main electronic altimeter. This had the effect of increasing the altimeter's reading by 170 metres (560 ft); as the TAWS takes readings from this altimeter, this had the additional effect of silencing the warning. The captain's secondary (mechanical) and the copilot's main electronic pressure altimeters continued to read correctly. As the descent continued, the crew realised they had started descent too late. To compensate for this, they increased their vertical speed to 8 metres per second (26 ft/s), twice the prescribed rate for a normal approach. The aircraft did not have enough drag to maintain speed with this rate of descent, so even though the auto-throttles commanded idle power from the engines, the speed of the aircraft increased to approximately 35 km/h (22 mph) higher than specified.

Approaching 300 metres (980 ft), the navigator began calling out the radar altimeter's reading. This is not standard practice for a non-precision approach, as the radar altimeter does not take into account the contour of the terrain around the airport. Standard practice would entail calling out the readings on the pressure altimeter, which is set according to atmospheric pressure and references the elevation of the airport. The terrain on approach to Smolensk airport is uneven and locally much lower than the runway level.

=== Warning signs ===
At 200 metres (660 ft), the engines were still at idle power. Power settings for jet engines are expressed in instrument readings and flight data recorders as percentages labelled as "N1" and "N2". N1 and N2 refer to the spools, or shafts, of a jet engine on which the compressor and turbine blades are mounted; jet engine power is measured as a percentage of maximum N1 or N2 rpm. Although the shafts are not mechanically connected, the speed of one spool can be calculated based on the speed of the other spool and atmospheric conditions. The Tu-154 manual indicates that a go-around must be initiated at 200 m if the engines are running at or below 75% N2. This is because jet engine throttle response is not linear; jet engines have to "spool up" in order to produce more thrust. At power settings higher than 78%, this response is almost instantaneous; at idle power, it can take a full 8 seconds for a jet engine to "spool up" to full power. On PLF101, the N2 values were not recorded by the flight data recorder (FDR). The N1 values were, and at 200 m they indicated 32–33% N1. 75% N2 equates to 51–52% N1 for the given conditions. Thus, the engines were well below the 75% minimum N2 reading, and the crew should have initiated a go-around at this point, even though they were still above decision height (DH). However, they did not go around, and continued the descent. The final report would later determine that a go-around was technically possible from as low as 40 m, but that 200 m was the first of many times that the crew were required to go around, but did not.

At 180 metres (590 ft), the "terrain ahead!" warning again sounded on the flight deck. The crew continued the descent. According to IAC's report, at 100 metres (330 ft) (decision height) there was no "landing" or "go-around" call by the captain. If this happens, the first officer is supposed to overrule the captain, take control of the aeroplane, and initiate a go-around. Poland suggests that at this point the captain said "Go around", and 8 seconds later the first officer confirmed by saying "go around" (only the second of these two statements is recorded in the official transcripts by IAC; the first one may have been obscured by a simultaneous report by TAWS). Despite these calls, neither pilot initiated a go-around, and the descent continued. One second after the 100 m altitude was reached, the TAWS alert "PULL UP" activated and continued to sound for the remainder of the flight. "PULL UP" activates only when the TAWS computer believes a collision with terrain is imminent. Thus, when "PULL UP" sounds, the crew is supposed to begin an immediate, maximum performance emergency climb (full power and angle of attack to the maximum permissible without stalling) and continue climbing until the warning stops. However, the crew continued the descent. There is a method of setting up the TAWS to prevent false warnings when flying into airports not in the database, known as "terrain inhibit" mode; however, the crew did not use it. Even if they had, an excessive rate of descent and excessive airspeed can cause the TAWS to issue a "SINK RATE" warning followed by a "PULL UP" warning. This point (10:40:40 local time, approximately 20 seconds before the collision with terrain) is also notable because this was the moment when the aircraft had crossed the minimum allowed approach slope for this airport (2°10'). Prior to this moment, the radar controller had no reason to think that the landing attempt was not proceeding normally. The behaviour of the controller was later the subject of some criticism by the Polish media. The controller remained silent for about 12 seconds after the aircraft passed the 100 m mark, and, even at that point, he did not order a go-around, but, rather issued an instruction to transit from a descent to a horizontal flight. (The decision to go around was apparently reached in the cabin of the aircraft within a few seconds of that instruction.) In addition, according to some interpretations of the radio exchange between the ground and the aircraft, the crew was instructed by the ground control to descend to 120 metres (390 ft) and either to wait for clearance to land or request one explicitly, or to inform the ground control regarding their decision whether to land or to go around. (According to IAC's report, it meant that the crew was supposed to inform the ground control of their decision to land before passing the decision altitude, and that the ground control was supposed to allow the landing as long as the runway and the airspace were clear.) None of this ever happened, with the aircraft continuing the descent through the 120 m mark while the ground control remained silent.

For the next several seconds, the crew continued to call out "100 meters" as read from the radar altimeter. The aircraft was flying into a valley at this time and descended by 60–70 metres (200–230 ft). The crew began calling out radar altitude every 10 metres (33 ft). At 60 metres (200 ft) radar altitude (where the crew had set their radar altitude bugs), the First Officer called out "Go around" (this is the "confirmation" go around call referred to in the Polish comment above). Due to the terrain in the area, the aircraft was actually only 15 metres (49 ft) above runway level at the time. Simultaneously to this callout, the FDR recorded a brief pull on the control column, likely done by the first officer, as he instinctively started the go-around sequence of actions. According to the investigation, this attempt at a go-around was completely overridden by the auto-pilot, which was still active, and, in any event, it was not completed (protocol requires that the correct sequence of operations during a go-around attempt involves increasing thrust to takeoff mode and disengaging the autopilot, neither action was done at the time). Flight simulator testing by the investigation concluded that had the first officer completed a go-around at this point, the crash would likely have been avoided despite the violation of minimums and the excessive rate of descent. The investigation found that this was the last moment at which a go-around could have been successful.

=== Point of no return ===
As the crew called out "50 meters", the controller instructed "level 101", telling the aircraft to terminate descent. At 20 metres (66 ft), another controller instructed "Check altitude, level." Simultaneously with this final call, the control column was pulled full aft, commanding max pitch up from the aircraft, and the throttles were moved within one second from their flight idle positions to maximum power. The aircraft, due to the valley terrain, was actually 15 metres (49 ft) below the runway at this time. The Russian investigation surmised that at this moment the flight crew saw the trees through the fog, and instinctively reacted in an attempt to escape their grave predicament. The crew did not disengage the autopilot, but the action of commanding maximum pitch up on the control column overrode it, causing the pitch channel to disengage. The control column briefly moved to neutral at this point, then moved full aft and remained there for the duration of the flight. According to the Polish report, the command "level" ordering a change to horizontal flight was issued at a time when the aircraft was at an altitude of about 14 metres (46 ft) above airfield level. Two seconds before the "level" command, the aircraft commander made the decision to go around. According to the Polish committee's findings, the command to level should have been issued 10 seconds sooner, when the aircraft was well below the glide path.

Soon after, the aircraft began hitting trees. One, a large birch with a trunk 30 to 40 cm (12 to 16 in) wide, ripped off about 6.5 metres (21 ft) of the left wing, including the left aileron. The resulting asymmetrical lift caused an uncommanded roll to the left. Within five seconds, the aircraft was inverted, hitting the ground with the left wing, followed very shortly after by the nose. The nose impact resulted in forces exceeding 100g, which killed everyone on board instantly. Even without the birch tree and subsequent roll, the excessive angle of attack would have led to an aerodynamic stall approximately two seconds after impact with that tree, which would also have led to a fatal accident. According to the Polish report, safety areas around every aerodrome are mandated by international regulations (including Polish and Russian law) to prevent situations where aircraft or aerodrome operation could be compromised by obstacles in the immediate vicinity. A thorough analysis of terrain reveals that obstacles were present in the safety area, with many trees exceeding the permitted height limit (mostly about 10–11 metres (33–36 ft)).

After the nose hit, the aircraft was violently torn apart by impact forces. The wreckage came to rest upside down about 200 metres (660 ft) before the runway threshold and slightly left of its centreline. The largest pieces remaining were the wing roots (the strongest part of an aeroplane), the wingtips and the tail section. The tail section came to rest backwards, relative to the direction of flight. A small post-impact fire ensued, but was quickly brought under control by the emergency services.

The governor of Smolensk Oblast, Sergey Antufyev, confirmed that there were no survivors of the crash. Pictures from the scene showed parts of the aircraft charred and strewn through a wooded area. The Russian prime minister, Vladimir Putin, said that the bodies of those killed in the crash would be brought to Moscow for identification. Kaczyński's body was identified in Smolensk and was flown directly to Warsaw on the afternoon of 11 April.

== Investigation ==
As the accident occurred on Russian soil, Russia was tasked by ICAO procedure with primary responsibility for investigation, which it carried out with international cooperation. Poland also set up its own committee to investigate the crash, and prosecutors in both countries began criminal investigations.

=== Interstate Aviation Committee ===
In the Commonwealth of Independent States (CIS), the Interstate Aviation Committee (IAC) (Russian: Межгосударственный авиационный комитет (MAK)) oversees the use and management of civil aviation. The committee's Air Accident Investigation Commission is responsible for investigating civil aviation accidents occurring in commonwealth member nations. The committee is headquartered in Moscow, Russia.

=== Immediate actions ===
Within hours of the crash, the president of Russia, Dmitry Medvedev, announced the establishment of a special commission for the investigation of the accident. The commission was to be supervised by Prime Minister Vladimir Putin. An Investigation Committee of the Prosecutor General of Russia started a criminal case in accordance with a "violation of the safety rules" of the Russian Criminal Code.

=== Flight recorders ===
Two flight recorders, the cockpit voice recorder (CVR) and the flight data recorder (FDR), were recovered undamaged from the crash site during the afternoon/early evening of 10 April, as was confirmed by Sergey Shoygu, the Russian minister of emergency situations. That evening, it was reported that the CVR recordings confirmed the crew attempted to land against the advice of air traffic controllers. A third flight recorder, a Quick Access Recorder (QAR) designed for maintenance diagnostics, was found on 12 April. The two Flight Management System (FMS) units were also recovered. The investigation was able to obtain information from the electronic memories of the Quick Access Recorder and one of the FMS units, despite the fact that they were not designed to withstand a crash. Since the FMS units are linked together, being able to read the memory of one meant the investigation was able to determine the actions performed by both units. It would later be discovered that the FDR was partially defective and had occasional gaps in its data, but as the QAR managed to survive the crash, by synchronising the data from the two units, a complete picture of flight data emerged.

On the day after the crash, investigators said they had reviewed the flight recorders, and confirmed that there were no technical problems with the Soviet-built aeroplane, ruling out initial theories that the 20-year-old aircraft was at fault. Alexei Gusev, general director of the Aviakor factory, said that the aircraft's three engines had been repaired and technicians had upgraded the plane's avionics at a recent overhaul the previous year. He said that there were no doubts about the plane's airworthiness.

=== Search for human remains ===
Ewa Kopacz, former Polish Minister of Health, claimed before the Sejm that after the crash, ground was dug to a depth of one metre, and even if a tiny piece of human flesh was found, it was genetically tested. However, in the transcript released online by the Sejm, the meaning of her speech was changed: that when a small piece of flesh was found, the ground was dug to a depth of one metre. Moreover, in September 2010, one of the Polish pilgrims to Smolensk found a jaw with teeth and two other bones.

=== Russian cooperation ===
Russia offered full cooperation to Polish prosecutors during the investigation. According to the IAC, Polish investigators in Russia have been given access to all procedures of Russian investigators. However, Edmund Klich, the head of the Polish investigative commission, said that "Poland does not have a lot of things that (we) would like to have" and as an example gives lack of documentation of Smolensk airport and regulations about Air Control. Polish investigators do not have the authority to conduct investigative actions by themselves, but they participated on equal terms with their Russian counterparts in the interviews with people involved and other parts of the investigation. Polish officials were to secure all Polish state documents found in the wreckage, as well as electronic devices (portable computers and mobile telephones) belonging to government officials and military officers. In turn Russian investigators received from Poland materials secured after the crash, including those about the technical state of the aircraft and fitness of the pilot. The Polish investigation results were to be based in part on Russian findings, but they are not bound by the results of the Russian investigation. Preliminary results of the investigations were to be released on the Thursday after the crash (including the cockpit voice recordings), but this was postponed until after the weekend when the funeral of the Presidential couple was to take place, then postponed indefinitely until the full analysis was completed. The Flight Data Recorder and Cockpit Voice Recorder, both of Soviet design, were analysed in Russia with the participation of Polish experts. The Quick Access Recorder, designed and produced in Poland, was sent to Poland and analysed there, with the participation of Russian experts. The Flight Management System units, manufactured in the United States, were analysed there with the participation of the FAA, NTSB, Polish experts, Russian experts, and the Interstate Aviation Committee (IAC).

=== Airport and pilot communication ===
The airport's traffic control communicated with the pilots in Russian, and one of the controllers claimed the Polish crew had problems communicating in this language. However, according to Tomasz Pietrzak, the former commander of the Polish 36th Special Aviation Regiment, the captain of PLF101 was fluent in Russian and English. The Captain had landed in Smolensk three days before the crash, when he was part of the crew bringing Polish prime minister Donald Tusk to the 7 April ceremony, and at the time no communication problems with ground control were reported. However, while the captain knew Russian, the rest of the crew did not, in particular the navigator whose task it is to communicate with the ground, thus placing an additional workload on the captain. Previous flights to Smolensk had been accompanied by a Russian navigator, but none was provided for the April 2010 flights, with differing reasons for this given by Polish and Russian sides. The final accident report would later conclude that the captain's knowledge of Russian was "satisfactory."

The airport, which normally should have been closed due to the severe conditions, was not declared closed as its management feared that this could cause a diplomatic incident. According to the news agency Interfax, the pilot was told that Smolensk North Airport was enveloped in thick fog and strongly advised against landing, but still he decided to continue with the original flight plan and attempt a landing. According to an interview with a flight controller Pavel Plusnin it was suggested to the pilot that he land at an alternative airfield in Moscow or Minsk. According to Plusnin, the pilot said, that he would attempt one approach, and if landing was not possible, he would then divert to another airfield.

There was some concern in the press as to whether or not Russian military ATC had the authority to issue military orders to Flight 101, as the aircraft was a military flight. Under Russian law, military flights are under the control of Russian military ATC, and permission or denial for approach and landing must be given by the controller prior to these actions being undertaken by a flight crew. The final accident report determined that, because it was a foreign military aircraft, Russian controllers did not have the authority to issue military orders to Flight 101, and this had been communicated to the ATC personnel who handled the flight. The "trial" approach was conducted with the understanding by ATC that all risk for such an approach was to be undertaken by Flight 101 and not ATC.

=== Theft from victims ===
On 6 June 2010, it was reported that payments worth €1,400 had been made from a credit card found on the body of historian Andrzej Przewoźnik, one of the victims of the crash. Credit cards belonging to the politician Aleksandra Natalli-Świat were also missing, but not used in transactions. On 8 June 2010, ITAR-TASS reported that four soldiers of Unit 06755 had been charged in connection with the theft, after being found in possession of three credit cards used to withdraw a total of 60,345 roubles. A Polish spokesperson said that the first withdrawals using the cards had been made around two hours after the crash. The Polish government admitted that the Russian soldiers involved in the theft were probably conscripts, and that earlier reports blaming members of Russia's OMON forces for the theft had been a mistake.

=== Initial reports ===
An initial report by the Interstate Aviation Committee revealed that all three engines were operating normally, and that there was no fire or explosion before the aircraft crashed. According to the newspaper Dziennik Gazeta Prawna, Polish flight recorder ATM-QAR registered that precisely at 8:41:02.5 (Polish time) the tail of the aircraft separated. All systems of Tu-154 stopped working at 8:41:04. Fuel temperature was below 0 °C (32 °F). Engines when the aircraft was above the road were at 60% of their nominal power (Tu-154 needs about 10 seconds to get 100% of power from engines). They also determined that the aircraft was 40 metres (130 ft) lower than it should have been.

The discrepancy among the time of the crash registered by MARS flight recorders (10:41:05.4), ATM-QAR recorder (10:41:04), and when electricity lines were cut by the crashing aircraft a second or two before the final crash (10:39:35) was never explained.

On 19 May 2010, the preliminary report of the investigation into the crash was published. Alexei Morozov, the head of the technical commission of Russia's Interstate Aviation Committee, stated that the Tupolev Tu-154M had no mechanical faults, and that an air traffic control official at Smolensk North Airport had "warned twice that visibility was 400 metres (1,312ft) and that were no conditions for landing". The investigation ruled out a terrorist attack, explosion or fire on board the aircraft as the cause of the crash. It was also reported that the voices of two non-crew members were heard in the cockpit during the period leading up to the crash. One of the voices was identified by sources as the Polish Air Force Commander, Lieutenant General Andrzej Błasik. However, according to the findings of the Polish prosecutor's office in January 2013, General Błasik had not stayed in the cockpit and was a regular passenger. The other voice was later identified as the Director of Protocol.

According to the Interstate Aviation Committee report from 19 May 2010, the aircraft first hit an 11-metre (36 ft) tree approximately 1,100 metres (3,609 ft) from the runway. The aircraft was also off by 40 metres (130 ft) from the extended middle line of the runway. The TAWS alarm "Pull up!" was first sounded at 100 metres (328 ft) altitude and then repeated several times before the crash. It was first sounded 18 seconds before hitting the tree and the crew attempted to abort landing 13 seconds later. Due to geographical relief the aircraft was actually 15 metres (49 ft) below the runway at the time of the first impact.

On 26 May 2010, it was reported that pilot error had been identified as the reason for the crash. Edmund Klich, the head of the Polish investigative commission, stated in an interview "Pretty much everything is clear right now and nearly all evidence has been gathered". "The pilots ignored the plane's automatic warnings and attempted an incredibly risky landing," Klich said. According to the report, the crew of the Tupolev Tu-154M failed to respond for 13 seconds when the plane's "terrain approaching" alarm warned that the aircraft was less than 100 metres (330 ft) from the ground. The aircraft attempted to pull up after hitting a five-metre-tall (16 ft) birch tree, but part of the left wing had been sheared off in the impact. The aircraft then went into a roll before landing on its back and disintegrating five seconds later. Edmund Klich declined to speculate on whether the pilot had been placed under pressure to land, commenting, "Psychologists will have to assess the stress levels the pilots were subjected to."

On 1 June 2010, Poland's Interior Ministry published a transcript from the cockpit voice recorder of the crashed Tu-154M. The transcript confirmed earlier reports that the aircraft had attempted to land in bad weather against the advice of air traffic control and the plane's terrain awareness warning system. At one point in the recording, Mariusz Kazana, the Director of Diplomatic Protocol in the Ministry of Foreign Affairs, enters the cockpit and was told by the pilot "Sir, the fog is increasing. At the moment, under these conditions that we have now, we will not manage to land" to which Kazana replies "Well, then we have a problem."

Expert commentators have noted that the flight navigator, who was listing the altitude readings on the transcript, was referring to the radar altimeter (which gives height above ground) rather than the pressure altimeter (which would provide the height relative to the level of the runway). Because the terrain rises up to the runway, this could have had the effect of causing the pilot to fly far too low. The Final Report confirms this is exactly what happened.

The Russian report was published on 12 January 2011, and the Polish report was published on 29 July 2011. Both reports placed the majority of the blame for the accident on the pilots for descending too low without being able to see the ground. The Polish report also harshly criticized the organisation of Poland's special aviation regiment and its leaders, as well as finding deficiencies in the performance of the Russian air traffic controllers and in the airport's lighting and approach area. In Polish discourse, there remained wider questions and unease about the potential causes of the crash. This prompted a Warsaw court and a separate military investigation. Some of the unease subsequently fuelled conspiracy theories revolving around aspects of the investigation, such as Russia's decision not to return the Polish plane wreckage to Poland.

=== Russian final accident report ===
The IAC completed their investigation on 20 October 2010. A copy of the report was sent to the Polish authorities, who had 60 days to comment, after which the report was published on 12 January 2011.

After the IAC report's publication, Poland stated that it was created in violation of Annex 13 to the Convention on International Civil Aviation because some requested documents and/or other evidence were not provided by Russia and, according to a Polish lawyer, because Polish comments to the final report were not agreed to nor fully applied.

The final report noted that the captain's electronic altimeter was set 170 metres (560 ft) higher than the actual aeroplane position. This change was made after the aircraft began its final approach, and soon after the first TAWS warning sounded. All other altimeters on board were set correctly. The investigation also determined that the controller's radar screen was not calibrated correctly and showed the aeroplane as being 90–150 metres (300–490 ft) closer to the runway than it actually was. Additionally, his radio calls to the crew regarding their distance to the runway were given in advance by an average of 500 metres (1,600 ft).

As part of their investigation, the IAC conducted an experiment in a Tu-154M simulator to determine how late the crew could have gone around. "The experiment confirmed that during approaches in conditions similar to the flight conditions of the T-154M ... with a similar flight profile with vertical speed of descent of 7–8 m/s ... the aircraft characteristics guaranteed safe go around from the height of 40 m (without taking into consideration the possible obstacles and terrain along the flight path)." Taking into consideration the terrain at Smolensk, the investigation determined the last moment a go-around manoeuvre would have been successful was coincident with the first officer calling "Go around" and briefly pulling the control column at 60 metres (200 ft).

=== Polish comments on the draft of the final report ===
On the same day that the final report was published by the IAC, Poland published its comments on the draft of the final report sent to the IAC before. Poland stated that their comments were not taken into consideration. The IAC did not include them in the report, but published this document on its website among other appendixes. Poland also published a final version of the IAC report with changes performed by the IAC in reaction for Polish comments highlighted (red colour means changes of text, blue means text addition).

The main points of Polish comments are:

- A list of documents, evidence, and other information requested by Poland but not received from the Russian side (First table in document "Lista wystąpień strony polskiej o dokumentację", List of requests from Poland about documentation. Entry "Nie otrzymano" means "Not received"). Sample of them: Standards of certification for usage of military airports on the Russian Federation territory, Instructions for flights in Smolensk area.
- Poland notes that, according to international agreement between Poland and Russia from 1993, PLF101 was classified in Poland as a military plane and should be treated as performing a military operation also on the territory of the Russian Federation, especially in non-classified airspace and during approaching a military airport without ICAO certification. During military operations the ATC can give orders to the crew about landing decisions as opposed to civilian flights where the ATC only gives recommendations, but where the final decision about landing is the pilots' responsibility.
- Information that result of analysis of CVR (Cockpit Voice Recorder), performed by Polish Commission for the Investigation of National Aviation Accidents, says that first officer gives command "go around" at 100 m altitude This analysis has been ignored by the IAC's final report.
- Request for document confirmation that Commander of the Landing Zone was allowed to work in bad weather conditions. Documents confirm only admission for work at day and night in normal weather conditions. Poland notices also that Commander of the Landing Zone had never before worked at Smolensk and in last 12 months performed this function only 7 times. All that information is in his testimony. There is no documentation which certificate Commander of the Landing Zone on Smolensk airport which is required by Russian Law.
- Polish position that ATC gives wrong information for Flight 101 ("on course, on glide slope") and "Level 101" was given too late. According to Final Report at this moment plane was up to 15–20 metres (49–66 ft) above runway level and 1,400 metres (4,600 ft) before runway begins.
- Differences in approach card described by Final Report and approach card received by Poland before 10 April 2010 with information that Russia sent documents without information about reference system of coordinates in document. Poland assumed that coordinates are expressed using WGS-84 which is worldwide standard. Current standard for reference system used in Russia (according to its own law regulation) is PZ-90 which differ from WGS-84 by less than 40 cm (16 in) in any given direction.
- Doubts about Smolensk compliance with Russian regulations because there were trees and other obstacles in an area 300 to 900 m long before the runway. The heights of these obstacles are 15m higher than allowed (according to both Russian and ICAO regulations). After the accident, trees in this area were cut. The structure of flight PLF101 began to be destroyed in that area.
- Polish explanation that there is no requirement in Military aviation for aircraft to have insurance (101 was owned and maintained by the Polish Military) and even civil regulations allows other financial protections besides insurance. In the case of Flight 101, the Polish National Treasury was financially responsible for the aircraft.
- Polish explanation that, according to Polish law, Certificate of Airworthiness is required for civilian planes and is not obligatory for military machines — instead of this certificate, Polish military planes have to accomplish conditions regulated by "Instrukcja służby inżynieryjno-lotniczej Lotnictwa Sił Zbrojnych RP" (Instruction for engineering and aviation service of Aviation Forces in Republic of Poland). Poland also provides list of documents that confirm plane compliance with that document.
- Information that Polish side had not received documentation of control flight over Smolensk nor documentation of RSP-6m2 radar system used in ATC.
- Doubts about reliability of protocol after control flight which confirmed that light system (LUCZ-2MU) is working properly on Smolensk when the IAC Final Report says it did not. Polish specialists were not allowed to be present during control flight.
- Doubts about proper work of radar display according to protocol from control flight.
- Request for source data to marker location on radar display described in Final Report. Information provided to Poland says that camera recorder in ATC was corrupted and there is no information about any other source data.
- Request for information about 13 recorders mounted in ATC, and data recorded (even corrupted) for analysis. the IAC states that camera, voice recorders and photo laboratory did not work properly, and much information was not saved.
- Information that FCOM of Tu-154M in fact does not prescribe using the autopilot during non-precision approach, however this is also not forbidden.
- Expressed lack of any document that confirms Flight 101's status under Russian law.
- Request for source data and method of calculation of Flight 101's weight. Poland says that original documentation about loading and weight measure was destroyed.
- Allegations that documents certifying the medical examination of air controllers had manual corrections and are inconsistent with their testimonies where they confirmed that medical point was closed on 10 April 2010.
- Correction of number of specialists—with list of their certifications—that performed technical support on flight PLF101

=== Polish publication of ATC tapes ===
At an 18 January 2011 press conference, the Polish investigators made public the information contained in the ATC recordings, and their analysis thereof. They concluded that the "on course, on glide path" calls given to the pilots were made when the aircraft was actually off course, and furthermore the "Level!" call was given 11 seconds too late.

=== IAC publication of ATC tapes ===
In response to the Polish claims of publicity, the IAC published transcripts of ATC recordings on its website. The announcement made on the IAC website states that the transcripts are based on a copy of recordings identical to the one which was given to the Polish side during the investigation.

The transcripts include: "Open microphone", phone calls and radio transmissions. The transcripts show that communication between the ATC and PLF101 was done mostly in Russian with only a few English phrases.

== Causes ==
=== IAC report ===
The IAC report found the "immediate cause" of the accident was the failure of the crew to make a timely decision to proceed to an alternate airport despite being warned multiple times of the poor weather conditions at Smolensk. Another immediate cause was the descent below minimums without visual contact with the ground as well as ignoring numerous TAWS warnings. This led to controlled flight into terrain. Additionally, the IAC report found an "immediate cause" of the accident was the presence in the cockpit of the Commander-in-Chief of the Polish Air Force, which placed extreme stress and "psychological pressure" on the Captain to "continue descent in conditions of unjustified risk with a dominating aim of landing at any means."

A "contributing factor" to the accident was a long discussion with the Protocol director and the crew of the Yak-40 regarding the actual weather and the impossibility of landing at Smolensk in such weather conditions. The report found this discussion caused the Captain to experience "clash of motives." On one hand he knew that landing in the reported weather conditions was unsafe. On the other hand, he faced strong motivation to land at Smolensk anyway. He expected a strong negative reaction from the president if he chose to divert the aeroplane and land at an alternate airport.

Other "contributing factors" were a lack of compliance with standard operating procedures, a lack of crew resource management, and a significant gap in bad weather flights by the PIC (he had not flown in weather conditions similar to Smolensk that day in four months). Additional "contributing factors" were the Navigator calling out radar altitudes without considering the uneven terrain in the area, utilisation of the autopilot and autothrottles much lower than minimum descent altitude which did not comply with the Flight Crew Operations Manual for the Tu-154, and the late start of the final descent which caused the crew to maintain a higher than normal vertical speed.

A "systemic cause" of the accident were "significant shortcomings in the organization of flight operations, flight crew preparation and arrangement of the VIP flight in the special air regiment."

=== Official Polish government report ===
The Polish Committee for Investigation of National Aviation Accidents (KBWLLP) published its report on 29 July 2011, also available in English and Russian. While the report stated that pilot error was the main cause of the accident, with the crew lacking adequate training in operating in adverse weather conditions, it differed from the Russian report in several aspects.

Chief among these differences was a conclusion that the pilots were not placed under pressure forcing them to land at Smolensk, and that the crew decided to abort landing when they reached 100m altitude (measured by radio altimeter) and had decided to go around using the autopilot. However, it was impossible for the autopilot installed in the aircraft to conduct an automatic go-around from a non-precision approach. The Polish investigation concluded this caused a delay in executing the go-around which contributed to the crash.

Another major difference was a conclusion that Russian air traffic control played a part in the accident by passing incorrect information to the crew regarding the plane's position. ATC gave distance callouts on average 500 metres (1,600 ft) in advance, and told the aircraft it was on the correct glidepath when it actually was not. Furthermore, the controllers gave the "Level 101" command ten seconds after the aircraft passed the 100 metres (330 ft) altitude where such call was supposed to be given.

The Polish report also found three deficiencies regarding the Smolensk airport which contributed to the crash. One was a large number of obstacles (mostly tall trees) in the area before the runway which should have been removed to keep the protected approach airspace clear of obstructions. The second deficiency was with the approach lighting system, which was charted incorrectly and not well maintained. Many bulbs were burned out, several others were missing their lenses, and others were obscured by shrubbery. The third concern was with the airport information received by Poland, which contained incorrect information. In addition to the lighting system not being depicted correctly, the airport's location was charted approximately 116 metres (381 ft) to the North of its actual position.

Due to numerous accusations raised by the opposition party Law and Justice (PiS), who rejected the official report's conclusions, a new commission was created in 2013 which was headed by Maciej Lasek. Its task was to publish and explain all the technical evidence used in the official report. Lasek commission's produced over a hundred very detailed technical reports, maps, transcripts, photos and videos which were originally published on www.faktysmolensk.gov.pl website. Shortly after the 2015 Polish parliamentary elections the website was shut down and all documents removed by the new government, but were subsequently restored on an independent mirror.

Cause of accident according to Polish report:

The immediate cause of the accident was the descent below the minimum descent altitude at an excessive rate of descent in weather conditions which prevented visual contact with the ground, as well as a delayed execution of the go-around procedure. Those circumstances led to an impact on a terrain obstacle resulting in separation of a part of the left wing with aileron and consequently to the loss of aircraft control and eventual ground impact.

Circumstances contributing to the accident:

1. Failure to monitor altitude by means of a pressure altimeter during a non-precision approach;
2. failure by the crew to respond to the PULL UP warning generated by the TAWS;
3. attempt to execute the go-around manoeuvre under the control of ABSU (automatic go-around);
4. Approach Control confirming to the crew the correct position of the aeroplane in relation to the RWY threshold, glide slope, and course which might have affirmed the crew's belief that the approach was proceeding correctly although the aeroplane was actually outside the permissible deviation margin;
5. failure by LZC to inform the crew about descending below the glide slope and delayed issuance of the level-out command;
6. incorrect training of the Tu-154M flight crews in the 36 Regiment.

Conducive circumstances:

1. incorrect coordination of the crew's work, which placed an excessive burden on the aircraft commander in the final phase of the flight;
2. insufficient flight preparation of the crew;
3. the crew's insufficient knowledge of the aeroplane's systems and their limitations;
4. inadequate cross-monitoring among the crew members and failure to respond to the mistakes committed;
5. crew composition inadequate for the task;
6. ineffective immediate supervision of the 36 Regiment's flight training process by the Air Force Command;
7. failure by the 36 Regiment to develop procedures governing the crew's actions in the event of:
  - failure to meet the established approach criteria;
  - using radio altimeter for establishing alarm altitude values for various types of approach;
  - distribution of duties in a multi-crew flight.
8. sporadic performance of flight support duties by LZC over the last 12 months, in particular under difficult WC, and lack of practical experience as LZC at the SMOLENSK NORTH airfield.

== Notable passengers ==
In addition to Kaczyński and his wife Maria, and Ryszard Kaczorowski, the last president of Poland in exile, on board were the military chiefs of staff (army, air force, navy), the national bank governor, a deputy foreign minister, head army chaplains of the Catholic and Orthodox churches, head of the National Security Bureau, three deputy parliament speakers, Olympic Committee head, the civil rights commissioner Janusz Kochanowski, trade union activist Anna Walentynowicz, and at least two presidential aides and widely known national lawmakers (including core members of PiS).

== Political aftermath ==
In accordance with the Polish Constitution, on the president's death his duties were taken on by the marshal of the Sejm (speaker of the lower house of the parliament)—at the time Bronisław Komorowski, who thus became acting president. Within two weeks he was obliged to announce the date of the presidential election, to be held within a further 60 days on a weekend. Kaczyński was up for re-election in late September or early October, before the end of his first five-year term.

Despite the deaths of the president and numerous officials, the crash was not expected to impair the functions of the government, since no cabinet ministers were aboard the plane. The Polish Armed Forces were dealt a severe blow, however, since all of their senior commanding officers were killed; their duties were automatically taken over by respective deputy commanders, following standard contingency plans for such a situation.

The commemoration of the 70th anniversary of the Katyn massacre was split up because of the political conflict between the liberal-conservative government of Prime Minister Donald Tusk and national-conservative President Kaczyński. On 7 April, Tusk, along with government officials and members of his Civic Platform party, went to Katyn on invitation from the prime minister of Russia, Vladimir Putin. The official commemoration, organised by Polish Council for the Protection of Struggle and Martyrdom Sites, was scheduled on 10 April. Nevertheless, both ruling coalition and opposition were represented on the plane, with six and nine members of the Sejm, as well as one and two from the Senate, respectively, some of them well known in Poland. Many passengers were actively opposed to Tusk's policies, including:

- President Kaczyński himself,
- President of the National Bank of Poland, Sławomir Skrzypek,
- Chief of the Institute of National Remembrance, Janusz Kurtyka,
- Polish Ombudsman Janusz Kochanowski,
- Jerzy Szmajdziński, the left-wing candidate in the upcoming presidential election.

The president of the Association of Former Intelligence Officers and former CIA analyst, S. Eugene Poteat, has written that political violence should not be ruled out under the circumstances of the aircraft crash.

The marshal of the Sejm, Bronisław Komorowski, had previously been announced as the Civic Platform's candidate in the presidential election. He suggested that the date of the elections should be decided by the parliamentary opposition, with him acting merely to guarantee that the Constitution is respected.

On 17 April, one week after the crash, a memorial service, including a two-minute silence, was held to honour the victims of the crash. It was reported that over 100,000 mourners attended the event, held in Piłsudski Square; however, up to 1.5 million had been expected.

=== State funeral ===
The funeral service for the presidential couple took place in Saint Mary's Basilica in Kraków on 18 April. The couple were buried in a crypt below Wawel Cathedral, a place traditionally reserved for people considered to be heroes of Polish history.

=== Presidential election ===
The first round of the election to elect President Kaczyński's successor was held on 20 June 2010. Since no candidate obtained an absolute majority, a run-off was held on 4 July 2010, between the two highest-polling candidates: the acting president Bronisław Komorowski, and the late president's brother Jarosław Kaczyński. While commentators noted that PiS gained some sympathy votes, it was not seen as a decisive factor in the election. In the second round of the election, Komorowski defeated Kaczyński with 53% of the vote.

=== VIP flight reorganisation ===
Following the publication of the Polish Accident report, the 36th Special Aviation Regiment which operated the flight was disbanded, and 13 Polish military officers were dismissed. Most Polish officials were instructed to fly on regular civilian flights. Two Embraer 170s were retained for government VIPs, but were flown by civilian pilots and operated by LOT Polish Airlines. The remaining aircraft from the regiment, including the surviving Tu-154, were sold. Subsequently, starting in December 2017, the Polish Air force acquired three Boeing 737s for government use.

== Reactions ==
=== Poland ===
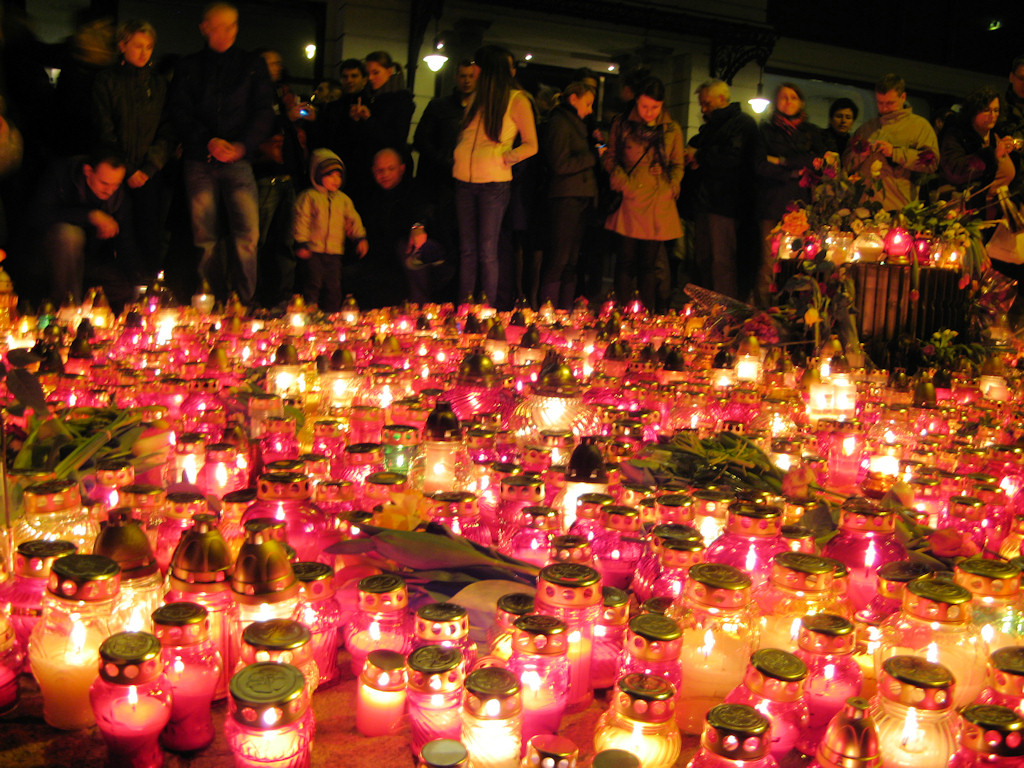
Crowds on the Royal Route, Warsaw

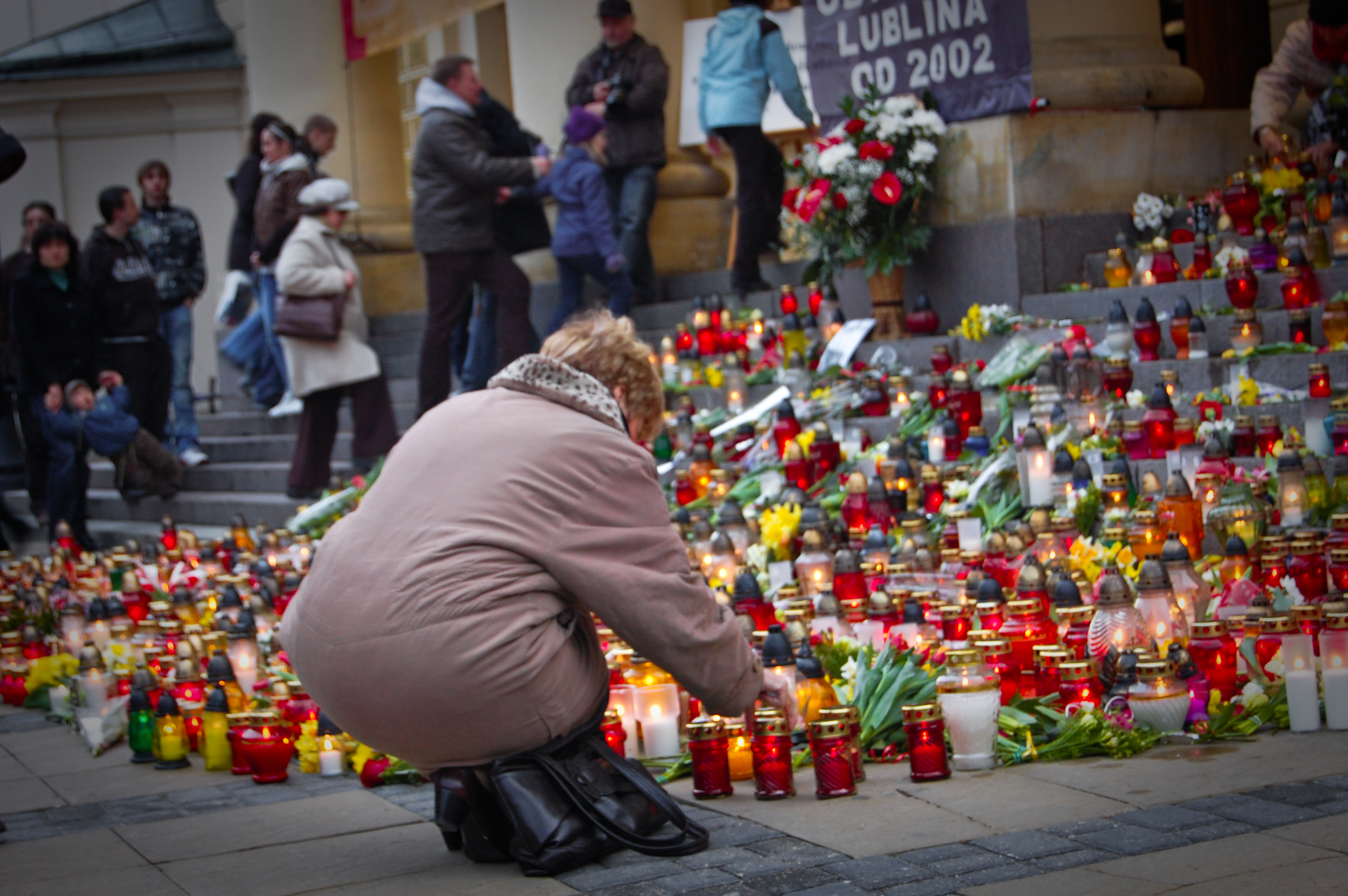
Flowers and candles in front of Lublin town hall

In Poland, the public reacted with shock and grief to the disaster. Almost immediately after the news broke, tens of thousands of Poles assembled at the Presidential Palace to lay tributes, including flowers, wreaths, and candles.

A week of national mourning was declared in Poland. Poles around the world mourned Kaczyński and set up shrines in the week that followed. Many wept openly. Flags flew at half mast in Poland. Sports fixtures, including women's U-17 UEFA Championship elite qualifying phase game Poland versus Republic of Ireland in Ukraine, were postponed. Concerts were cancelled.

On 11 April, Kaczyński's body was flown to Warsaw on a military plane; tens of thousands of Poles gathered at both the airport tarmac and the streets of the city to pay their respects to the late president as his casket was driven by hearse to the Presidential Palace. Afterwards, the casket was laid in state at the Palace. The casket remained there throughout the week, until Kaczynski and his wife were laid to rest at the Wawel Cathedral a full week after the crash, on 18 April.

On 15 April, Polish scouts put a wooden cross in front of the Presidential Palace in Warsaw, at Krakowskie Przedmieście, to commemorate the victims of the crash. The establishing of the cross provoked controversy in Poland, mainly related to questions concerning the separation of church and state. Polish Catholics wanted the cross to permanently remain in front of the palace, while others, including Komorowski, wanted it moved to St. Anne's Church. After a summer of protests over the cross, it was transferred to the church on 16 September.

A public noon commemoration ceremony in Warsaw's Piłsudski Square was attended by more than 100,000 people on 17 April. Sirens sounded and bells tolled around the country. A three-gun salute was fired. People waved the flag of Poland, complete with black ribbons, as the names of the victims were read out from a white stage decorated with a giant cross and photographs of the dead. The crowds bowed their heads.

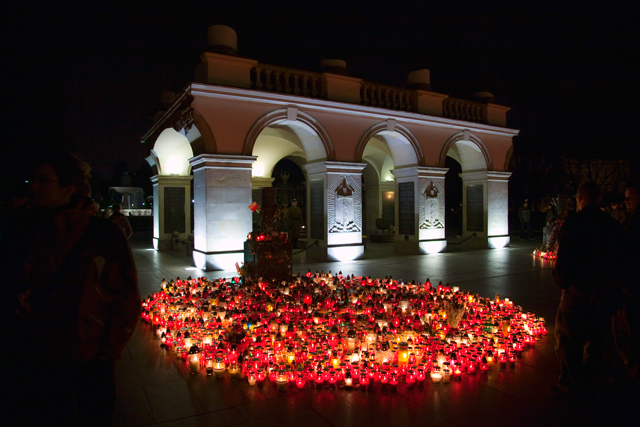
Tomb of the Unknown Soldier, where flowers and candles were brought by Warsaw residents for the victims of the presidential plane crash

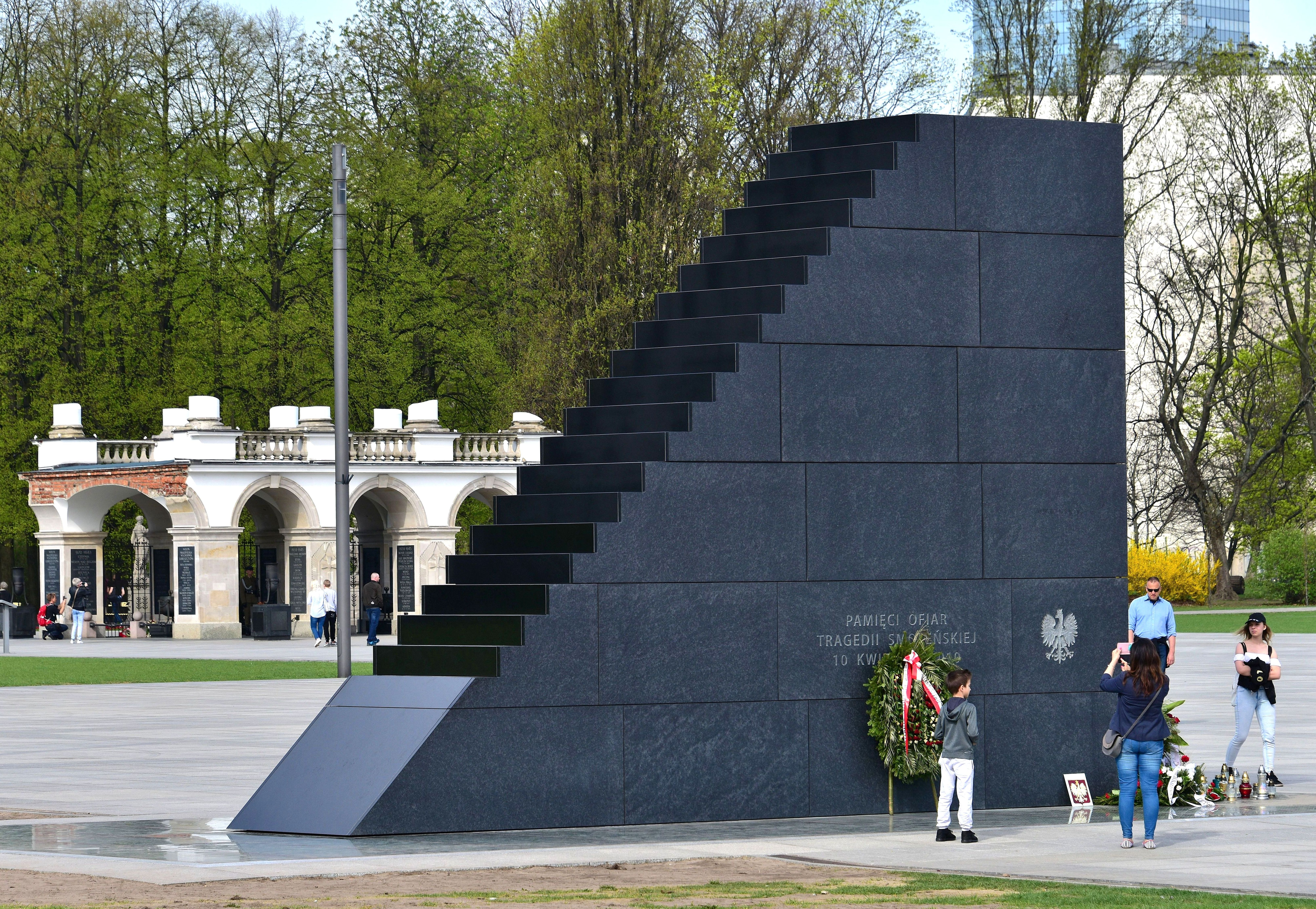
Monument to the victims of 2010 Smolensk air crash, in front of the Tomb of the Unknown Soldier, in Warsaw (2018)

On 18 April, the couple's caskets were driven at a slow pace through the streets of Warsaw, passing the city hall and a museum dedicated to the 1944 Warsaw Uprising which Kaczyński favoured. The funeral ceremony began at 2 pm local time (12:00 UTC) with a mass held at Kraków's St Mary's Basilica, with thousands attending. Archbishop of Kraków Stanisław Dziwisz presided over the ceremony, and addressed President of Russia Dmitry Medvedev personally: "The sympathy and help we have received from Russian brothers has breathed new life into a hope for closer relations and reconciliation between our two Slavic nations".

Former president Aleksander Kwaśniewski told TVN24 that, "It [Katyn] is a cursed place. It sends shivers down my spine. First the flower of the Second Polish Republic is murdered in the forests around Smolensk, now the elite of the Third Polish Republic die in this tragic aircraft crash when approaching Smolensk North Airport." Polish prime minister Donald Tusk stated that, "The contemporary world has not seen such a tragedy". Former Polish prime minister Leszek Miller, who had himself suffered injuries in a helicopter crash while in office, said that Poland's aircraft were known to be in need of replacement, despite the lack of evidence that anything was wrong with the particular aeroplane; "I once said that we will one day meet in a funeral procession, and that is when we will take the decision to replace the aircraft fleet," he said. The crash fuelled anti-Russian sentiment among far right extremists, with Polish nationalists invoking the tragedy during a riot outside the Russian embassy in Warsaw in November 2013.

=== Russia ===
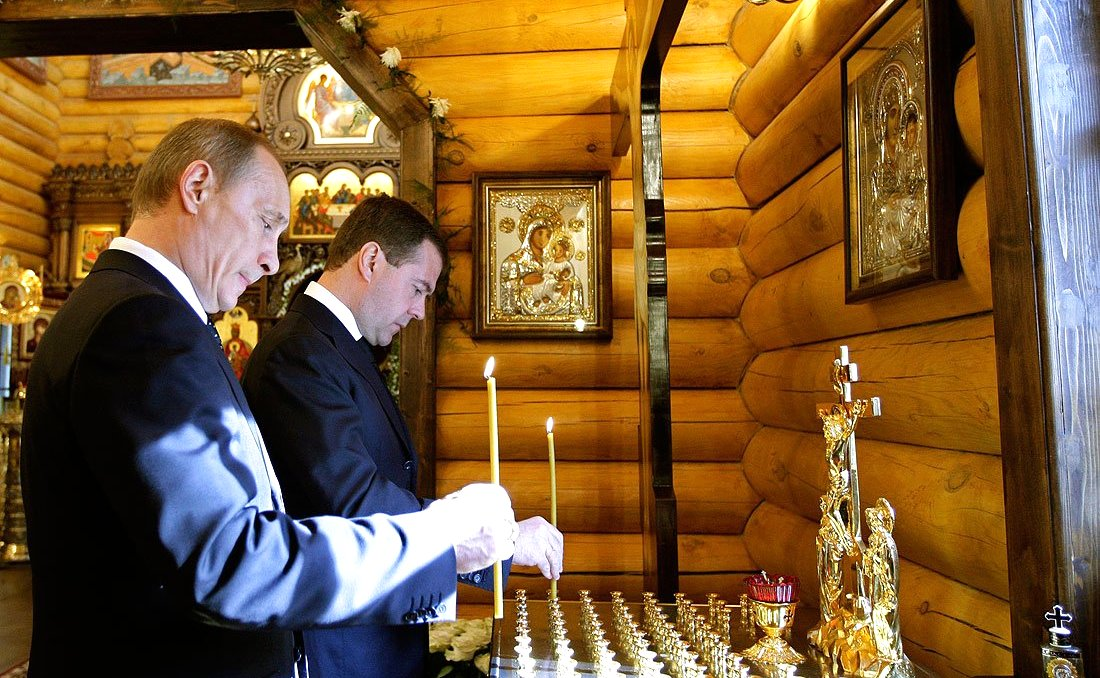
Dmitry Medvedev and Vladimir Putin in church

Dmitry Medvedev addresses the people of Poland. (subtitles in English from official transcript available)

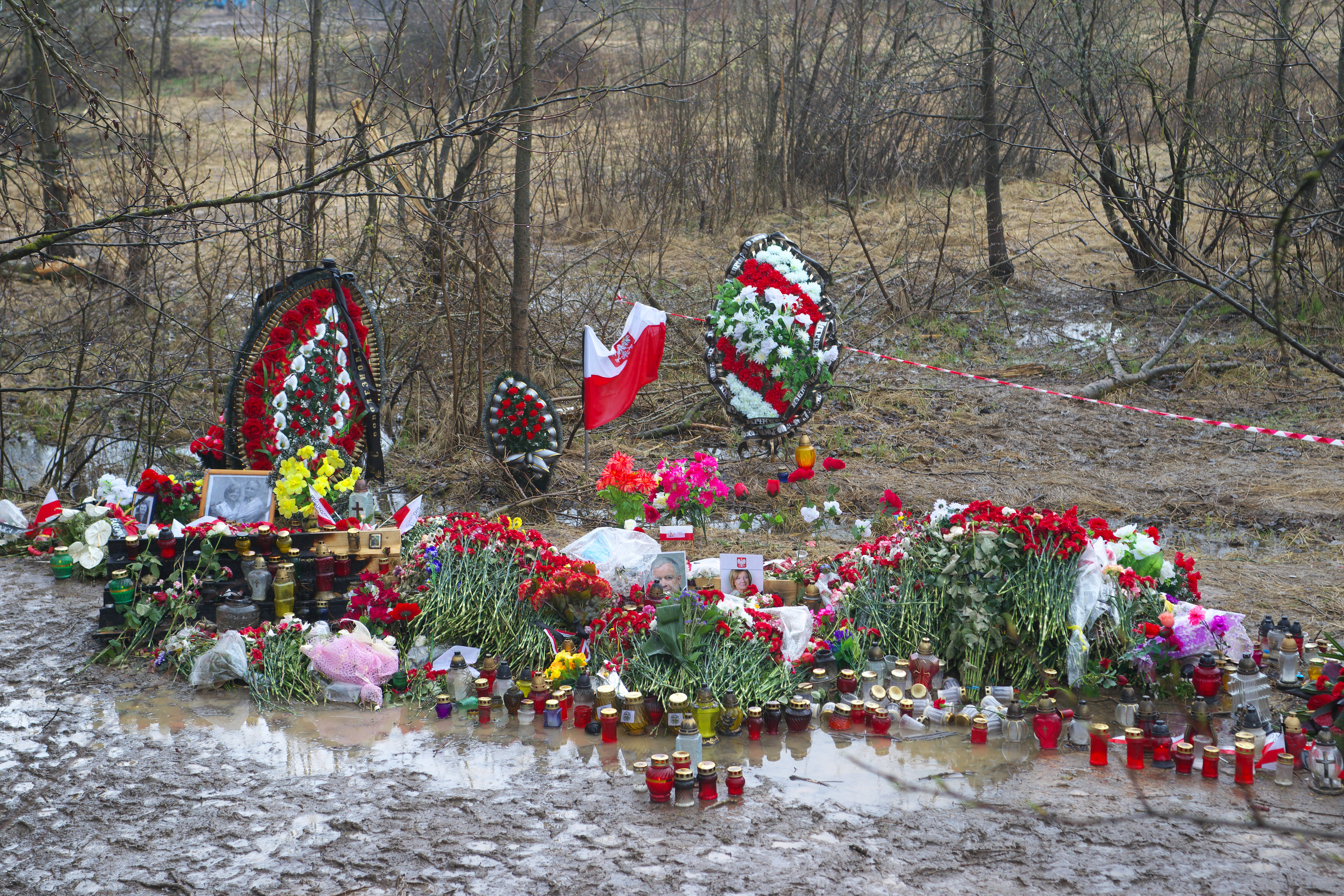
Improvised memorial at the Russian crash site

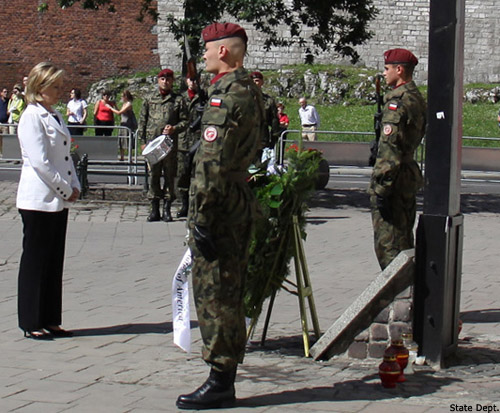
United States Secretary of State Hillary Clinton lays a wreath at the Katyn Cross

Russian president Dmitry Medvedev and Prime Minister Vladimir Putin expressed their condolences to the acting president and speaker of the parliament, Bronisław Komorowski. President Medvedev also announced that 12 April 2010 would be a national day of mourning in Russia. Chairman of International Committee of the State Duma Konstantin Kosachev said that "Katyn claimed yet more victims". Chairman of the State Duma Boris Gryzlov has expressed condolences.

Russians and foreigners laid flowers and candles at the Polish embassy in Moscow, and at the Polish consulates-general in Saint Petersburg and Kaliningrad.

After the aircraft crash, the state owned Russia Channel broadcast the film Katyń for the second time in Russia. The film, which was not distributed in Russia, was first shown in Russia on another state-owned channel, the less popular Kultura Channel on 2 April 2010. The first showing of Katyń was a political event, which was followed by a serious discussion of Polish-Russian relations by politicians and public figures, and drew high audience numbers for the smaller channel, with an estimated 100 million Russian viewers.

While Polish commentators saw Putin's participation in the ceremony held on 7 April as a symbolic gesture, they were touched when Putin and Tusk paid tribute and laid flowers at the site of the crash. Tusk knelt and briefly hid his face in his hands, then stood up as Putin patted him on the shoulder. The two hugged, then gave a joint press conference on the investigation into the crash. Polish commentators noted this was a human gesture, and a display of emotion that Poles had longed to see from their eastern neighbours.

On 11 April, holding a bouquet of red roses, Putin was reported to have appeared truly distressed as he escorted Kaczyński's body to a Warsaw-bound plane. Later Putin said in a Polish television interview: "This is of course first and foremost Poland's tragedy and that of the Polish people, but it is also our tragedy. We mourn with you".

The Russian response has been noted favourably by Poles, with talk of a thawing in the relationship between Russia and Poland. Witold Waszczykowski, deputy head of Poland's National Security Bureau, told Reuters, "We did not expect this gentle, kind approach, this personal involvement from Putin. Naturally it will have a positive impact on the relationship between our countries." Jerzy Bahr, the Polish ambassador to Russia also stated, "We can sense Russian solidarity at every step of the way."

As part of this thawing of relations, on 28 April 18 days after the crash, Russia's state archive publicly published a number of previously secret files on the Katyn massacre on their website. The files were declassified in the early 1990s, but before their publication they were only available to specialised researchers.

On 26 November 2010, the Russian State Duma passed a resolution admitting that Soviet leader Joseph Stalin personally approved the Katyn massacre. The Soviets had long claimed Nazi Germany were the ones responsible. Although this stance changed in 1990 when Mikhail Gorbachev admitted the Soviet NKVD secret police carried out the massacre, the November 2010 resolution was the first time the Russian government admitted direct involvement by Stalin.

In an interview with Rzeczpospolita, Andrei Illarionov, Vladimir Putin's former advisor, noted, "... contrary to the promises, the investigation of this crash is neither transparent nor dynamic." and added, "... the Polish side does not have full and free access to documents and evidence." Illarionov was also one of the signatories of an open letter written by Russian dissidents, which voiced concerns about the conduct of the investigation. According to the letter, "rapprochement with the current Russian authorities is more important for the Polish government than determining the truth about the plane crash." Polish prime minister Donald Tusk responded that his government would obtain flight data from the Russian investigators before making its own judgement and revealing it to the public.

=== International ===
At least 96 countries, 13 international organisations and several other entities expressed their reaction on behalf of the incident. An official mourning was proclaimed in 18 countries other than Poland. Condolence books were opened in many public locations such as the Polish Social and Cultural Centre in London, where Prince Charles signed their condolence book.

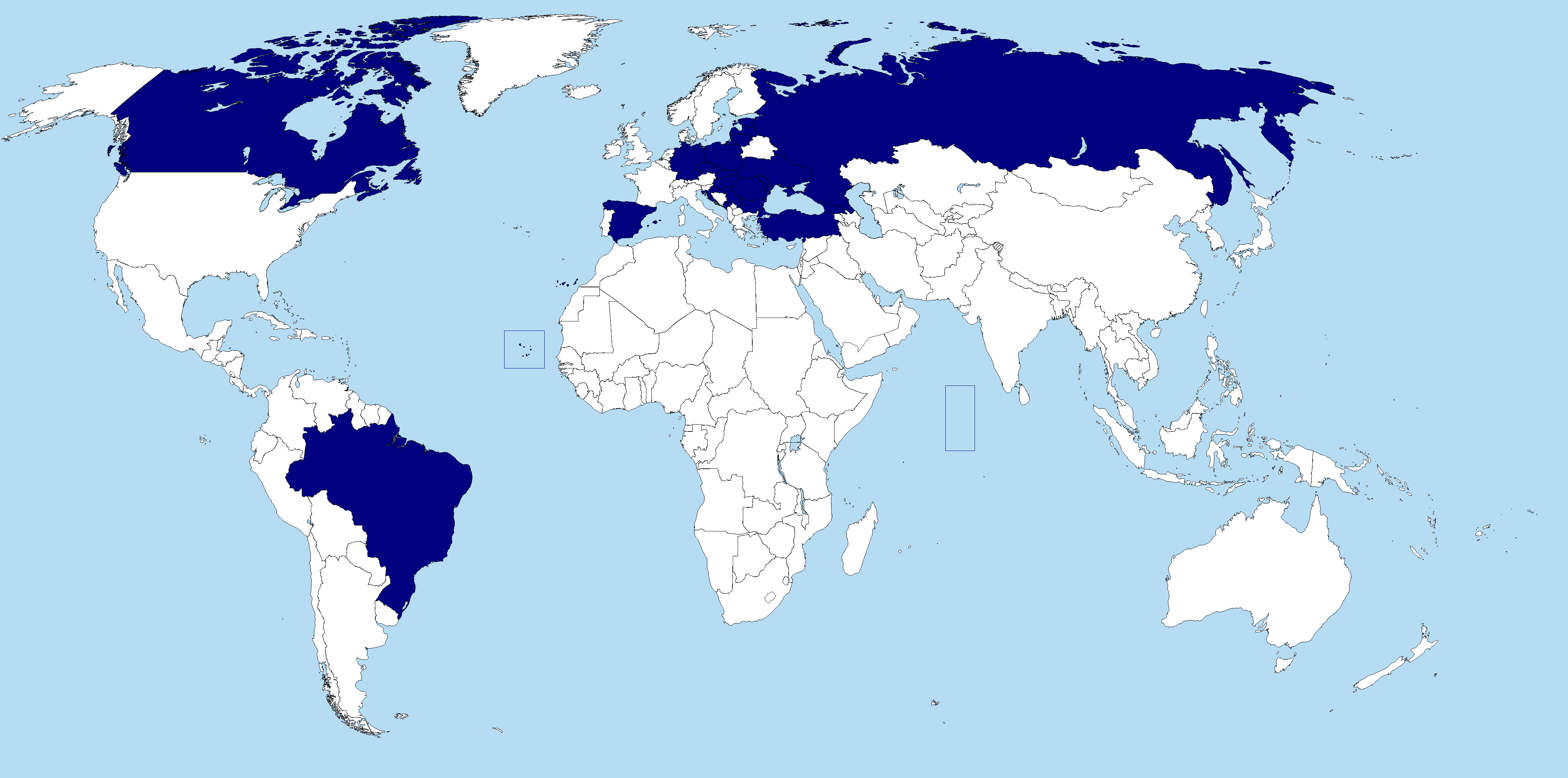
Countries with official mourning

Twenty-three countries observed a varying number of days of official mourning; Brazil: 3, Bulgaria: 1, Canada: 1, Cape Verde: 1, Croatia: 1, Czech Republic: 2, Estonia: 1, Germany: 1, Georgia: 1, Hungary: 1, Latvia: 1, Lithuania: 4, Maldives: 2, Moldova: 1, Montenegro: 1, Poland: 9, Romania: 1, Russia: 1, Serbia: 1, Slovakia: 1, Spain: 1, Turkey: 1, Ukraine: 1.

Victims of the aeroplane crash were also commemorated by minute of silence before several football matches throughout Europe, including El Clásico Real Madrid C.F. – FC Barcelona in Spain; or FC Baník Ostrava – 1. FC Slovácko and Prague derby AC Sparta Prague – SK Slavia Praha in the Czech Republic.

Some concern arose that Kaczyński's funeral would have to be delayed as a consequence of volcanic ash emanating from Iceland and the resulting air travel disruption in Europe. Only one airport in the country was open, and several international dignitaries were unable to attend. The funeral nonetheless went ahead as scheduled.

NATO was reportedly concerned over the possible compromise of many of its secret codes and communications procedures to the Russian government. Many of the Polish government and military officials on the aircraft apparently carried secret NATO communication key codes and devices which were recovered by the Russians after the crash.

As of November 2015, Russia is still in possession of the wreckage and black boxes of the Tupolev, having refused various requests made by the Polish government to return the items. In 2018, the Parliamentary Assembly of the Council of Europe (PACE) issued resolution #2246 which calls Russian Federation to hand over the wreckage of the plane.

== Allegations of political assassination ==
Conspiracy theories have been in circulation since the day of the accident, claiming in general that the crash was in fact a political assassination, an act of war against Poland or an elaborate coup attempt, possibly orchestrated by Russia. The range of such theories has been described by some international media as "dizzying"; from the idea that the fog around the airport had been artificially produced, to victims' bodies being doctored in fake autopsies, to the idea that explosives were planted on board the plane. Reports favourable to such conspiracy theories have in particular very often referred to an alleged detonation that happened immediately before the plane hit a birch tree.

Soon after the crash, Artur Górski, a PiS MP, claimed that the Smolensk air traffic controllers were ordered to prevent the plane from landing, so that the president could not attend the Katyn ceremony, resulting in the crash. Górski later apologised for his remarks. PiS leader Jarosław Kaczyński and the head of the parliamentary committee of investigation Antoni Macierewicz have been described as long time supporters of the assassination theory, and have repeatedly accused the then prime minister Donald Tusk of being involved in a cover-up. Macierewicz repeated these accusations as newly appointed minister of defence in 2016, causing a significant controversy in Polish, Russian and international media.

=== Claims of explosives traces ===
On 30 October 2012, the Polish newspaper Rzeczpospolita reported that traces of explosives had been detected by investigators in the wreckage of the Tupolev, on the wings and in the cabin. The claims were denied by Polish prosecutors—who claimed that a number of common substances could as well have produced the observed readings—and were later withdrawn by the owner of the newspaper. Rzeczpospolita's editor-in-chief and three other staff, including the author of the article, were fired from their jobs. (Note: The author of the article, maintaining his claims but expecting to be fired, tendered his resignation. However the board opted to ignore his resignation and fire him instead.) The author of the article in question, Cezary Gmyz, maintained that what he wrote was confirmed by four independent sources.

The editor-in-chief of Rzeczpospolita published a video in which he explained that he decided to publish the article only after talking to the Public Prosecutor General, Andrzej Seremet.

Seremet said they had had the information for 10-20 days - about highly energetic molecules that can be used as an ingredient of explosives. He said he had personally informed Prime Minister Tusk about it. He said, thinking out loud, that maybe these were remnants of the war, that they would need to wait until the soil around the wreckage is sampled too, and that it was going to last a couple more months. Not a single time did he suggest that these molecules can point to another source than explosives - like perfume or a tent. Moreover, he added something that mattered to me - namely, that "we knew that the information was going to leak out sooner or later", while looking at me inquisitively, and saying: "We knew that some of the prosecutors decided to brag about these discoveries quickly. Because it leaked out of the prosecutor's office, didn't it?"

— Tomasz Wróblewski, editor-in-chief of Rzeczpospolita

Seremet responded by claiming that he told the editor that the highly energetic particles (Note: "Particle" is a more general term than "molecule", and can mean anything from subatomic particles, through molecules and ions, to particles of dust. The particles in question were airborne molecules. The handheld explosives detector ionizes them and then detects what they are based on their behaviour in an electric field.) detected can be of "various" origin.

I said back then that I can confirm that during the inspection and examination of the wreckage in Smolensk, the experts' measuring instruments revealed the presence of some highly energetic materials, similar to explosives, but I said not to reach any conclusions, especially those equivalent to [conclusions] that such materials had been used against or towards that plane.

— Public Prosecutor General Andrzej Seremet

In November 2015, a court in Poland ruled in favour of the sacked journalists, stating that the information published in the article correctly reflected the state of knowledge at the time of publication.

After the 2012 publication, there was some discussion about the trustworthiness of the handheld explosives detectors used. The Supreme Military Prosecutor's Office (NPW) announced that they examined the interior of the other Polish government Tu-154M (the one that did not crash), and during the examination the handheld explosives detectors did, in some places, signal the presence of explosives - implying that the readings of the instruments in general cannot be trusted. The manufacturer of the detector countered that the only way the detector can be fooled is when its benchmark (an element containing trace amounts of explosives, for reference) is clogged because of very high concentrations of specific substances in the surrounding air - for example, when put inside a bottle of acetone, or very close to a sample of perfume - which according to him is very unlikely to happen in the field; and even then it behaves in a way that would cause the user to notice the device is malfunctioning, because it alternates between different substances being reported instead of reporting just one of them. The results of an experiment conducted by some journalists seem to confirm that.

A relative of one of the victims brought back remains of the victim's clothing and a piece of seatbelt (including the clip) from Smolensk, and sent them to the United States for private examination. The examiners did not find traces of explosives on the piece of clothing. They did, however, find traces of TNT on the seatbelt. The analysis was qualitative, stating that the substance was present but not determining its quantity.

In 2017, it was announced that the British Ministry of Defence was engaged by the Polish government to examine the wreckage of the aircraft for traces of explosives. The work would be done by scientists based at the Forensic Explosives Laboratory at Fort Halstead, Kent. In early 2019, Polish right-wing weekly Sieci reported that partial results from the Forensic Explosives Laboratory were in, and that the "traces of explosives" were confirmed in the "vast majority" of a few dozens of samples that had been tested by the British so far. British air accident investigator Frank Taylor, who was involved in the investigation into the losses of Pan Am Flight 103 and British Airtours Flight 28M but did not investigate the Flight 101 crash apart from inspecting photographs presented by Antoni Macierewicz, claimed that there were explosions on board the aircraft, including in its wing, immediately before it reached the tree.

According to Polish experts, trace amounts of high explosives could be present in the aeroplane due to frequent presence of military personnel on board, or as result of contamination on the ground, as the Smolensk area was a battlefield during World War II. The fact that the traces were found on some parts of the aeroplane (e.g. belts) but not on others (e.g. bodies), their trace amounts and chemical character all have been described as inconsistent with the hypothesis of an in-flight bomb explosion. The 2013 report of Maciej Lasek commission also did not corroborate the idea. For example, the bomb explosion theory is not supported by the fact that the plane's debris is concentrated in a relatively small 160x50 m area, and no parts of the plane's interior were found before the first ground contact.

=== Birch tree ===
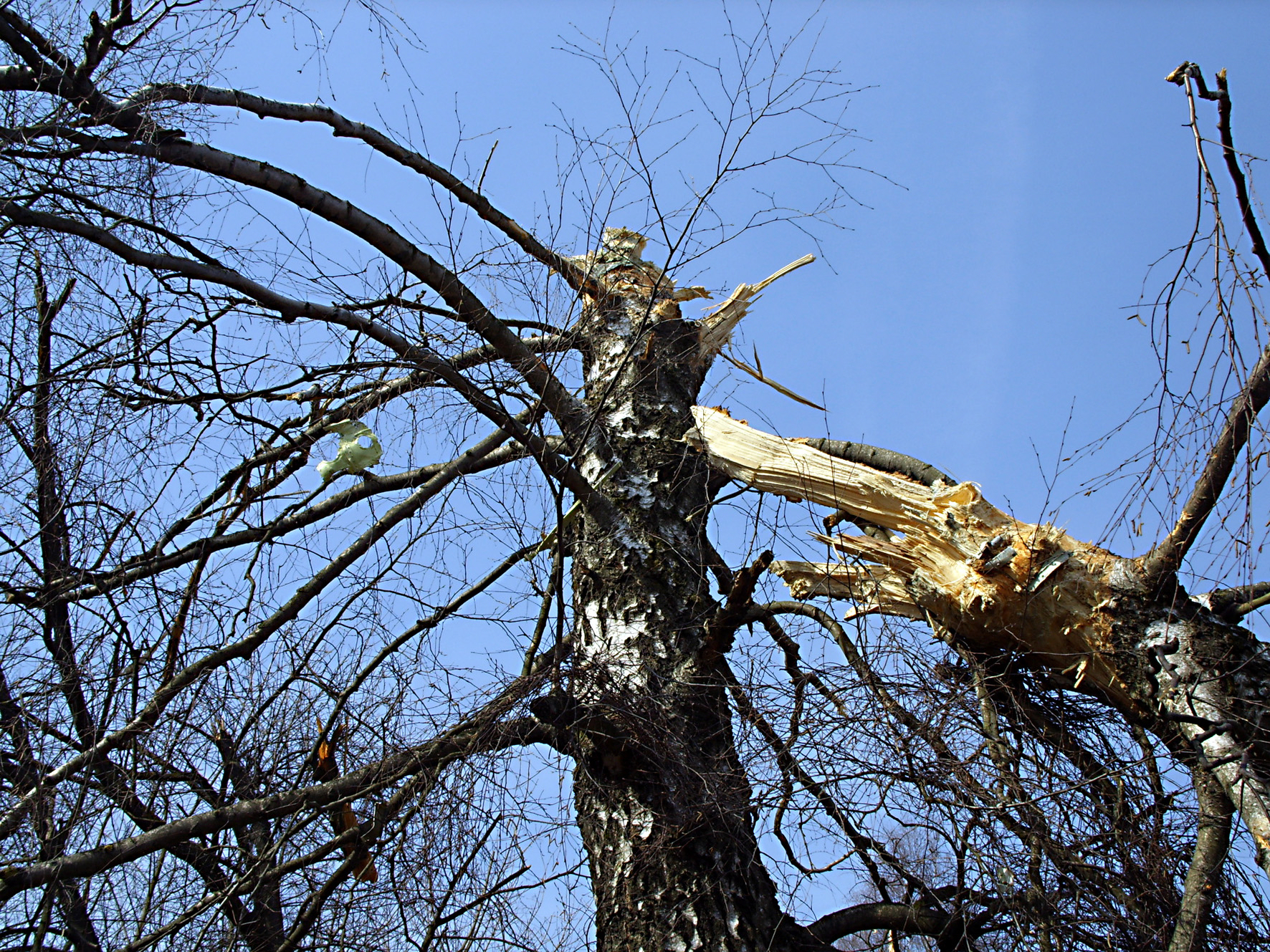
Smolensk birch tree with visible damage and Tu-154 fragments

Proponents of the assassination theory cast doubt on the probability of the Tu-154's left wing sustaining damage following its collision with a birch tree as described in the 2011 reports. In some cases, critics of the official narrative have derisively characterised it as involving a collision with an "armoured" birch tree (Polish: Pancerna brzoza). Members of the 2011 investigations have repeatedly stressed that the fact of the plane's left wing colliding with the birch tree is an obvious one, while photographs of the birch tree in question show it to have sustained considerable damage and to contain fragments of the Tu-154. National Institute for Aviation Research simulations confirmed that the damage to the plane's left wing was consistent with a collision. Even if the plane had avoided a collision with the birch tree and thus the subsequent uncommanded roll, the excessive angle of attack would have led to an aerodynamic stall approximately two seconds later which would also have led to a fatal accident.

=== Macierewicz-led reports ===
==== Law and Justice parliamentary committee publications ====
In July 2010, a group of Polish MPs, mostly from PiS, formed the "Parliamentary Committee for the investigation of the Tu-154M crash in Smolensk", chaired by the party's deputy leader Antoni Macierewicz. Later in November, Macierewicz called for the United States to lead an independent international commission on the accident. Some US Republican congressmen supported this idea but the US has never acted upon it.

In March 2015 the Polish committee published a report in which it claimed that two separate explosions took place on board the Tupolev in the last few seconds of its flight, bringing the aircraft down; a third explosion allegedly occurred after the impact with the ground. The committee's conclusions were partly based on a paper by Wiesław Binienda of the University of Akron, in which the author presented computer simulations that claimed to prove that the impact with the birch tree could not have severed the plane's wing. The paper, however, was self-published and not peer-reviewed. According to the committee's scientists – Binienda, Kazimierz Nowaczyk from the University of Maryland and Gregory Szuladziński – the direct cause of the crash was not a collision with an obstacle, but two explosions in the last phase of the flight: first on the left, by which the plane lost part of the left wing, then another inside the hull. It was alleged that the official reports from 2011 contained contradictions, errors, and manipulations. Binienda also claimed that if an accidental crash had occurred, then the cut wingtip could not have flown over 100 metres from the tree, the Tu-154's hull could not appear to have been torn from within, and there should have been a crater in the ground as a result of the crash. Szuladzinski's report stated that any landing or fall in a wooded area, regardless of its adversity or its angle, could not in any way result in such fragmentation of the Tu-154 as was documented. Nowaczyk analysed data from FMS and TAWS system and came to the conclusions that the plane flew over the tree and was torn at a height over 30 metres above the ground. Wacław Berczyński, a former software engineer at Boeing, pointed to the pulled-out rivets of the hull sheeting and claimed that this could only have been caused by an internal explosion.

Starting in October 2012, an independent (financed by its participants) Smolensk Conference was organised annually in Warsaw and attended by scientists and researchers from Polish and foreign universities to provide a forum intended to introduce and discuss independent studies related to the catastrophe. The last (fourth) of these meetings was convened in November 2015 and its proceedings (with summaries and abstracts in several languages) were published in 2016 (with a letter from the president of Poland, Andrzej Duda). The Scientific Committee of the Conferences was chaired by Professor Kazimierz Flaga. The Advisory Committee included 114 academics.

==== Subcommittee for the Re-investigation of the Smolensk Air Crash ====
Following PiS's victory at the 2015 Polish parliamentary elections, the newly conservative government appointed the chair of the Polish Parliamentary Committee of Investigation, Antoni Macierewicz, as defence minister, and the question of the Smolensk crash was brought back into the government's agenda. New foreign minister Witold Waszczykowski announced that Poland would sue Russia in a human rights court over Moscow's withholding of the wreckage. The Consul of Europe's Parliamentary Assembly designated a special investigation rapporteur who will carry out an inquiry on whether holding back the wreckage and other evidence material by the Russians is justified.

On 25 November 2015, government spokeswoman Elżbieta Witek called for former prime minister Donald Tusk to be put on trial for his handling of the 2010 air disaster. Adam Lipiński, from the Prime Minister's Chancellery, accused Tusk of negligence and weakness in handling the investigation and the restitution of the wreckage. Deputy Minister of Culture Jarosław Sellin stated his absolute conviction that there were explosions on board the Tu-154 and that the real cause of the Smolensk crash had not yet been established. Polish president Andrzej Duda, from PiS, wrote a letter to the participants of the 4th Smolensk Conference that took place on 14 November 2015 in Warsaw, describing the official Russian and Polish accident reports as 'simply hypotheses' inconsistent with evidence, and stating that the investigation on the crash is not complete.

In November 2015, the government shut down the faktysmolensk.gov.pl website, which had been set up by state authorities under Tusk's cabinet to explain in simple terms the findings of the official investigations. No reason was given for the website closure. An independent mirror was created shortly afterwards.

In February 2016, Macierewicz announced the official reopening of the investigation in the so-called Subcommittee for the Re-investigation of the Smolensk Air Crash (Polish: Podkomisja do spraw Ponownego Zbadania Wypadku Lotniczego), declaring that the previous inquiries were "riddled with mistakes" and reaffirming his belief that the aircraft disintegrated mid-air immediately before impacting the ground. As part of the renewed investigation, the remains of the deceased Polish president were exhumed on 14 November 2016.

In January 2018, the subcommittee claimed that a number of explosions had occurred aboard the airliner, with these claims being formalised during the presentation of their preliminary findings in February. The head of the previous commission, Maciej Lasek, dismissed the claims as "illusions" and "propaganda". In April 2018, the subcommittee published a further report which said that the plane was destroyed in a mid-air explosion, and that Russian air traffic controllers at the Smolensk air base had misled the pilots about the plane's location during its approach to the runway; this report was described as one focusing on technical issues, with Macierewicz stating that the final report was yet to be published.

In June 2021 a ruling was delivered in a long trial where officials were accused of negligence in the flight's preparation. The judge stated that there were four parties directly involved in the flight preparation: the President's Office (KP), the Prime Minister's Office (KPRM), the Government Protection Office (BOR) and the 36th Special Aviation Regiment, with each of these having broken numerous procedural safeguards which would have prevented the crash. The President's Office should not have requested flight to an airport that was legally closed and not ready to accept such flights, the Prime Minister's Office should have not accepted and proceeded with the President's requests as it was not compliant with existing laws and procedures, and similar negligence was shown in the actions of the remaining two parties.

The date of publication of the subcommittee's final report had been repeatedly delayed since 2016, with these delays generating a significant amount of frustration and criticism even among its members. Glenn Jorgensen, Marek Dąbrowski, Wiesław Chrzanowski and Kazimierz Grono were eventually removed from the subcommittee and published a statement in which they rejected the conclusions of the report and their authorship. PiS MEP Beata Gosiewska, who had unsuccessfully requested a written version of the final report from Macierewicz, accused him of turning the investigation into an object of ridicule and of exploiting the disaster to advance his political career. In February 2021, Civic Platform senator Krzysztof Brejza made a request to the Polish Ministry of National Defence for information on how much the subcommittee's efforts had cost; the Ministry did not furnish Brejza with these figures, leading him to bring a legal case which, in September, he ultimately won. In December, following Brejza's receipt of the information that he had requested, it was reported that around 22.63 million zlotys had been spent by the subcommittee between its 2016 inception and February 2021 despite the continued absence of the final report; in comparison, around 6.11 million zlotys had been spent between the immediate aftermath of the crash in 2010 and the publication of the 2011 reports.

In April 2022, Jarosław Kaczyński stated that he had seen investigative documents in his capacity as a relative of a victim, with these documents supposedly confirming that the crash was induced deliberately; he went on to claim that the decision to bring down the plane was made "at the highest level of the Kremlin" and that the Polish government of the day covered up the truth of the matter as part of a "macabre reconciliation" with Russia. Conversely, Civic Coalition Sejm member Barbara Nowacka, whose mother Izabela Jaruga-Nowacka died in the crash, claimed that, while the documents did describe the crash as deliberate, they only did so because the investigation was politicised and had "very little to do with the real evidence". Nowacka also accused PiS of conducting a "political war on the coffins of our loved ones" and of attempting to divide Poland over "our common tragedy". On the twelfth anniversary of the Smolensk disaster, 10 April 2022, both Macierewicz and Kaczyński alluded to the imminent publication of the subcommittee's final report whilst again painting the crash as a deliberate act. The report was subsequently published the following day and essentially repeated earlier allegations that the plane was destroyed by explosives as part of a Russian assassination plot; the report's publication was marked by a press conference where Macierewicz described the events in Smolensk as constituting an act of unlawful interference by Russia. The report and its corresponding webpage were temporarily retracted when it was reported that imagery of victims' corpses had been included in the report without distressing aspects of those images being redacted; Macierewicz subsequently issued an apology to the victims' families and to any private individuals who had seen the images. The images originally formed part of classified addenda from 2016 that discussed the burns on the victims' bodies; the author of the addendum, Marek Dąbrowski, said that his work had been retracted about a year before over disagreements with the subcommittee's work and was therefore used without his consent, and that he did not want to be associated with the actions of Macierewicz. It was also reported that other parts of the report, which was eventually republished on the domain belonging to the publisher of niezalezna.pl, a right-wing daily, were poorly redacted and the shaded text could be quickly uncovered using conventional software.

Shortly after the report's publication, the director of the Interdisciplinary Modelling Centre of the University of Warsaw (Polish: Interdyscyplinarne Centrum Modelowania Matematycznego i Komputerowego UW, ICM) to whose "mathematical modelling" results the report referred on a number of subjects declared that the ICM had never participated in the work of the subcommittee and its computing resources had been used on a commercial basis for computations he described as pseudo-scientific.

In September 2022 TVN24 journalist Piotr Świerczek published an extensive investigation, including interviews with members of the subcommittee and external experts, documenting numerous cases where Macierewicz manipulated their results or reports of external laboratories, and came up with conclusions which were inconsistent or contradictory to the expert assessment of the evidence. For example, the American National Institute for Aviation Research (NIAR) was hired to test whether the wing of a Tu-154 could break off upon impact with a birch tree as was reported to have happened during the disaster. The simulated collision saw the wing breaking off the plane upon impact in similar fashion to the findings of the 2011 reports. The NIAR's conclusions were completely ignored by Macierewicz and then misrepresented to prove the opposite case, namely that the wing cut through the tree without significant damage. Similar manipulations were applied to the pyrotechnical simulations of the wing, where a redacted photo was presented to fit the hypothesis that the wing suffered an internal explosion. Voice recorder analysis was interpreted by the subcommittee in complete contradiction to the conclusion of a voice analysis expert who did not confirm that any explosions could be heard. The subcommittee responded by insisting on the accuracy of the new report's version of events and by accusing TVN24 of committing its own manipulations and presenting Russia's point of view; in contrast, Donald Tusk, who now served as leader of the Civic Platform, called for Macierewicz to be tried and imprisoned in connection with the reported manipulations. Jarosław Kaczyński denounced critics of the subcommittee's report as being "agents of [Vladimir] Putin" during a Sejm debate on TVN24's findings, and would later use a press conference to make similar comments about there being a "powerful front" defending Putin; Kaczyński also claimed that the NIAR report would be published, but did not offer any specific timeframe for this to happen. On 4 December, a further report from TVN24 stated that the National Public Prosecutor's Office had asked several international experts to examine the bodies of eighty-three Smolensk victims, with these examinations failing to find any evidence that the victims' injuries were caused by an explosion. The experts' opinion was submitted to the Prosecutor's Office on 20 September, but the latter had yet to reach a decision on public dissemination at the time of TVN24's report.

On 1 December 2022, PiS attempted to amend a planned Sejm resolution on recognising Russia as a state sponsor of terrorism in order to include a section describing Russia as being "directly responsible" for the Smolensk crash and for the 2014 shooting down of Malaysia Airlines Flight 17. All members of the opposition refused to vote on the amendment, depriving it of the required quorum; the resolution itself failed to pass after Elżbieta Witek, a PiS MP who currently serves as the marshal of the Sejm, refused to allow a vote on the earlier, unamended version. Borys Budka, leader of the Civic Coalition's Sejm caucus, accused Macierewicz of "still trying to impose his lies" about the crash and asked if he and Kaczyński were attempting to provoke a war with Russia; in turn, Macierewicz accused the opposition of being a "pro-Russian formation" unwilling to tell the truth about "Russian terrorism". On 14 December, a second attempt to pass the resolution was also boycotted since it again included an amendment attributing direct responsibility for the Smolensk crash to Russia; on this occasion however, the resolution was successfully passed, with Macierewicz thanking supporting Sejm members for making "a great decision that [broke] the previous Smolensk lies".

In response to the September 2022 TVN24 report, entitled Siła Kłamstwa (The Power of Lies) in its broadcast version, Macierewicz submitted a complaint to the National Broadcasting Council where he accused the station of broadcasting "the Russian point of view" and misleading public opinion. On 30 December 2022, the head of the council announced the launch of proceedings against TVN to determine if it had broadcast "false information contrary to the Polish raison d'état and threatening public security", thereby being in breach of its broadcast licence. TVN responded by accusing the Council of trying to clamp down on journalistic criticism of the commission, and proceeded to make The Power of Lies available for free on its Czarno na białym YouTube channel. In January 2023, after TVN had decided to widen distribution of the original TVN24 report to any media outlet expressing interest, Onet, Gazeta Wyborcza, Wirtualna Polska, RMF FM, Radio ZET, and other outlets republished the report in a show of solidarity with the station.

In April 2023, at a speech marking the thirteenth anniversary of the crash, Jarosław Kaczyński announced that Polish prosecutors would soon be asked to investigate it as a deliberate assassination and also suggested that Vladimir Putin should appear in the International Criminal Court in connection with the crash. Kaczyński also accused the wider world of wanting either to believe "nonsense stories" about the crash being an accident or to forget about it entirely, and stated that fully explaining "the Smolensk crime, but also [...] the Smolensk coverup" and punishing the supposed perpetrators of both acts was "one of the conditions for [Poland's] final victory" and that "every reasonable person knows [it was an assassination]... We have to convince the rest of our nation". The speech was condemned by opposition figures such as Radosław Sikorski and Mariusz Witczak as a further attempt to exploit the crash for political purposes and as "soulless cynicism". Antoni Macierewicz later used a Polish Press Agency interview to confirm that his committee was preparing a request to prosecutors.

Following elections in October 2023, PiS no longer commanded a majority in the Sejm and, after a final abortive attempt to secure parliamentary support for a modified PiS-led government, a coalition of parties opposed to it came into power in December 2023. The new defence minister, Władysław Kosiniak-Kamysz, signed a decision on 15 December which dissolved the subcommittee and repudiated its April 2022 report, with the ministry also announcing the appointment of a team tasked with analysing the subcommittee's activities. Subcommittee members immediately had their approvals to act on behalf of the body revoked and were asked to surrender all documentation and equipment by the following Monday (18 December). The new deputy defence minister, Cezary Tomczyk, said the decision represented the end of "lies in the name of the Polish state", the end of spending money on "activities that have nothing to do with explaining [...] the Smolensk disaster, but have a lot to do with politics", and "a truly historic moment when the Polish state [...] recognises that it is specialists who explain the causes of a disaster, not politicians, fraudsters, and people who use lies as a tool". Antoni Macierewicz responded by insisting on the subcommittee's independence, by saying that Kosiniak-Kamysz had no legal right to dissolve it before the planned date of completion of its work in August 2024 nor to accept or reject its report, and by calling Tomczyk's comments nonsensical. Earlier in the week (12 December), two former employees of Donald Tusk's prime ministerial office at the time of the disaster, including his then-chief of staff Tomasz Arabski, who had been convicted for failing to fulfill their duties in relation to the organisation of the flight to Smolensk had these convictions overturned by the Supreme Court of Poland which ordered that a retrial was required due to the possibility of legitimate doubt over whether the judges who had previously ruled on the case did so objectively.

On 2 February 2024, a court ordered Macierewicz to apologise for a May 2020 tweet in which he had claimed that Donald Tusk, Radosław Sikorski, and Tomasz Siemoniak had been "harbouring criminals, the perpetrators of the Smolensk Tragedy".

On 10 October 2024, Cezary Tomczyk announced the Ministry of National Defence's intention to inform prosecutors about potential criminal damage which he claimed that the subcommittee had inflicted on Tu-154M 102, the sister aircraft to the crashed Tu-154M 101. Photographs of 102 were displayed which were taken by the subcommittee in 2018 and which showed both the exterior and the interior of the aircraft to have been partially dismantled, with Tomczyk adding that this disassembly had been carried out with saws, grinding tools, and hammers. Macierewicz denied both the dismantling in general and the use of the tools described by Tomczyk in particular.

On 24 October 2024, the Ministry of National Defence presented the report on the legal and professional aspects of the work of the Subcommittee for the Re-investigation of the Smolensk Air Crash. The report concluded that the subcommittee operated in a way suggesting that its only purpose was to promote a single hypothesis (an explosion on board) while disregarding any other evidence. Conclusion of the subcommittee were inconsistent with the existing evidence and laws of physics, while its work costed the state budget over 80 million PLN, including irreversible damage to a twin Tu-154 inflicted during subcommittee experiments.

=== Opinion polls and foreign reaction ===
In general, the assassination theory did not find much support among the general population of Poland. Since 2012, support for the notion that the Smolensk disaster was in fact an assassination generally oscillated between one-fourth to one-third of Poles. Belief in the theory is stronger among supporters of PiS and its allies - during the 2020 Polish presidential election for example, 56% of those who voted for PiS-backed Andrzej Duda believed in the theory, while support for it among those who voted for other candidates was in the single or low-double digits. Support for the assassination theory surged during the 2022 Russian invasion of Ukraine, with an April 2022 poll conducted on behalf of wPolityce.pl, a right-wing pro-government website, finding that 48% thought the assassination theory was plausible and 33% did not, with the remaining 19% being undecided. An Ipsos poll for OKO.press in May 2022 found that 52% believed that the crash was an accident, 36% believed that it was caused by a deliberate attack, with this figure including 78% of those who identified themselves as PiS supporters, and the remaining 12% were undecided.

The assassination theory did not gain significant traction outside of Poland prior to Russia's invasion of Ukraine, with foreign outlets generally describing the claim as a conspiracy theory or an allegation, while Russia has consistently denied any involvement in the crash. Following the first weeks of the invasion, Ukrainian president Volodymyr Zelenskyy appeared to give credence to the theory in his March 2022 address to the Polish Sejm, speaking of the "silence of those who knew exactly everything but still looked constantly at our neighbour [Russia]". Former Ukrainian president Viktor Yushchenko also stated a belief in Russia being responsible for the crash in 2023. In a 2023 Facebook post, former Georgian president Mikheil Saakashvili also claimed that Russia caused the crash.

== In culture ==
Several places in Georgia, Lithuania, Moldova, Ukraine, and Poland were named after the casualties. In addition, several films about the crash have been made.

=== Documentary films ===
- Solidarni 2010 (Solidarity 2010) – prod. Film Open Group, Poland, dir. Ewa Stankiewicz, Jan Pospieszalski, 2010
- Катынский синдром (The Katyn Syndrome) – prod. Channel One, Russia, 2010
- Brief uit Polen (Letter from Poland) – prod. VPRO, Netherlands, dir. Mariusz Pilis, 2010
- Katastrofa (The Disaster) – prod. and dir. Artur Żmijewski, Poland, for São Paulo Art Biennial, 2010
- Mgła (The Fog) – prod. Gazeta Polska, Poland, dir. Maria Dłużewska, Joanna Lichocka, 2011
- W milczeniu / Tragedy in Smolensk – prod. TVN, coop. BBC World News, Poland and UK, dir. Ewa Ewart, 2011
- 10.04.10 – investigative documentary, prod. Gazeta Polska, Poland, dir. Anita Gargas, 2011
- Lista pasażerów (Passenger List) – prod. Studio Gołąb for TVP1 and Rzeczpospolita, Poland, dir. Ewa Stankiewicz, Jan Pospieszalski, 2011
- Modlitwa Smoleńska (Smolensk Prayer) - prod. Telewizja Polska Kraków, Poland, 2011
- Pogarda (Contempt) – prod. Gazeta Polska, Poland, dir. Maria Dłużewska, Joanna Lichocka, 2011
- Krzyż (The Cross) – prod. Film Open Group, Poland, dir. Ewa Stankiewicz, Jan Pospieszalski, 2011
- Zobaczyłem zjednoczony naród (I Saw United Nation) - prod. Film Open Group, dir. Anna Ferens, 2011
- Smoleński lot (Flight to Smolensk) - prod. Telewizja Polska, Poland, dir. Monika Sieradzka, 2011
- Przebudzenie (Awakening) – prod. Gazeta Polska, Poland, dir. Joanna Lichocka, 2012
- Anatomia upadku (Anatomy of a Downfall) – investigative documentary, prod. Gazeta Polska, Poland, dir. Anita Gargas, 2012
- Mayday, also known as Air Crash Investigation, episode 95 - "Death of the President" – prod. Cineflix for National Geographic, Canada, dir. Su Rynard, 2013
- Polacy (Poles) - prod. Film Open Group, Poland, dir. Maria Dłużewska, 2013
- Anatomia upadku 2 (Anatomy of a Downfall. Part 2) – investigative documentary, prod. Gazeta Polska, Poland, dir. Anita Gargas, 2014
- Zamach smoleński (Smolensk Assassination) – mini series, prod. Film Open Group, Poland, dir. Grzegorz Braun, 2015-, not finished
- Stan zagrożenia (In an Emergency) – prod. Telewizja Polska, Poland, dir. Ewa Stankiewicz-Jørgensen, 2020

=== Narrative films ===
- Prosto z nieba (Straight off the Sky) – prod. Muflon Pictures, Poland, dir. Piotr Matwiejczyk, 2011
- Smolensk – prod. Fundacja Smoleńsk 2010, Poland, dir. Antoni Krauze, 2016

=== Theater ===
- Describe the Night, by Rajiv Joseph, 2017, stage play

== See also ==
- Similar Polish aircraft accidents
  - 1943 Aircraft crash of Polish Prime Minister Władysław Sikorski
  - 2003 Polish Air Force Mi-8 crash of Polish Prime Minister Leszek Miller
  - 2008 Mirosławiec air disaster
- Similar non-Polish aircraft accidents
  - 1940 Canberra air disaster
  - 1957 Cebu Douglas C-47 crash
  - 1981 air crash of Ecuadorian president Jaime Roldós
  - 1986 Mozambican Tupolev Tu-134 crash
  - 1996 Croatia USAF CT-43 crash
  - 2001 Avjet Aspen crash
  - 2004 Aircraft crash of Macedonian president Trajkovski
  - 2008 Mexico City Learjet crash
  - 2010 Cameroon Aéro Service CASA C-212 Aviocar crash
  - 2012 Philippine Piper Seneca crash
  - Afriqiyah Airways Flight 771
  - 2024 Varzaqan helicopter crash
- List of accidents and incidents involving commercial aircraft
- List of accidents and incidents involving military aircraft (2000–09)
- List of disasters in Poland by death toll
- List of fatalities from aviation accidents
