= Wiesław Binienda =

Polish-American scientist

Wiesław K. Binienda
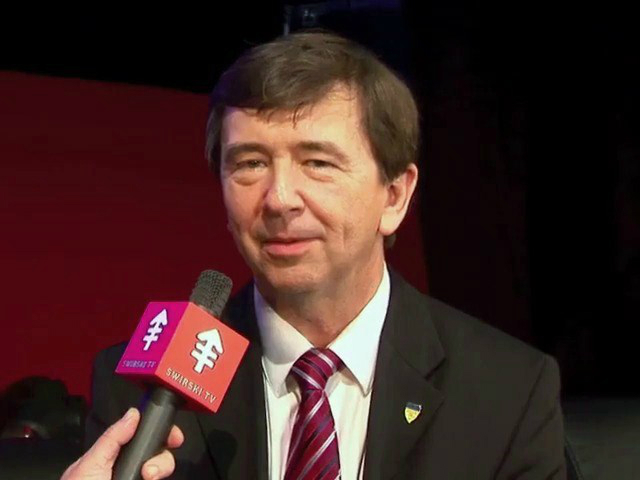
- Born: 20 August 1956 (age 70); Koło, Poland
- Known for: Investigation of Polish Air Force Tu-154 crash
- Scientific career
- Fields: Aerospace Engineering

Wiesław Kazimierz Binienda (born 20 August 1956 in Koło, Poland) is a Polish-American scientist, researcher, PhD, and professor and co-director of the Gas and Turbine Research and Testing Laboratory on the Department of Civil Engineering at the University of Akron.

== Research ==
His research includes impact simulation, fracture and damage of advanced composite materials, explicit and implicit finite element mechanics, smart materials, structural design and optimization, characterization and constitutive equation development for ceramic matrix, metal matrix and polymer matrix composites.

He received the 2002 College of Engineering Outstanding Researcher Award in recognition of his research accomplishments. He has authored or coauthored 2 books, 46 journal papers, 73 conference publications, and 70 presentations.

Dr. Binienda was the lead scientist who questioned and investigated the 2010 Polish Air Force Tu-154 crash carrying top officials of Polish government. His findings were in direct contradiction to reports published by the official Russian and Polish air crash investigation bodies.

Binienda and his wife Maria Szonert-Binienda are also involved in research and education about war crimes committed by Soviet Army against Polish soldiers in the Katyn massacre.

== Education ==
Binienda received his PhD in Mechanical Engineering from Drexel University in 1987, his M.S. in Mechanical Engineering from Drexel University in 1985, his M.S. in Motor Vehicles, and Heavy Duty Machines from Warsaw Technical University in 1980. Binienda is also involved in research projects with NASA.

== Academic work ==
- Professor and Chair Civil Engineering Department University of Akron
- Expert of the Steering Committee of US President Council of Advisors of Science under Advanced Manufacturing Initiative AMP
- Member of Supercomputing Committee, Ohio Supercomputer Center
- Member of Resource Committee, Ohio Supercomputer Center
- Member of Software Committee, Ohio Supercomputer Center

== Current research ==
- Analysis of the Polish Governmental Plane Crash in Smolensk, Russia, on 10 April 2010
- Status Report on Smolensk Crash
- High Velocity Impact on Composite Structures (Laminates, Braided Fabrics and Composites)
- Characterization of Aging Influence on Braided Composites
- Fracture mechanics and damage growth in composite materials
- Stress and deformation analysis in FRP, MMC, BMC and rubber composite materials
- Filament winding process development and analysis
- Explicit FEA of Composite Structures – Impact Perforation Analysis
- Nano-coating processing and analysis
- Application of Advanced Composites for Retrofitting of Concrete Structures
- Functionally Graded Layers Analysis
- Research Facilities and Research Group
- High Velocity Impact Lab (Gas Gun; Aramis System; Shearography Vacuum Chamber for NDE, Aging Chamber, MTS, etc.)
- Computing software (ABAQUS, ANSYS, LS-DYNA, PATRAN etc.)

== Publications ==
NASA Publications

- W.K. Binienda, D.N. Robinson, S.M. Arnold and P.A. Bartolotta, "A Creep Model for Metallic Composites Based on Matrix Testing: Application to Kanthal Composites," NASA TM 103172, 1989.
- D.N. Robinson, W.K. Binienda and M. Miti-Kavuma, "Creep and Creep Rupture of Strongly Reinforced Metallic Composites," NASA TR 185286, 1989.

W.K. Binienda, S.M. Arnold and H.Q Tan, "Calculation of Stress Intensity Factors in an Isotropic Multi-C racked Plate: Part I – Theoretical Development," NASA TM 1 05766, 1992.

- S.M. Arnold, W.K. Binienda, H.Q. Tan and M.H. Xu, "Calculation of Stress Intensity Factors in an Isotropic Multi-Cracked Plate: Part II – Symbolic/Numeric Implementation," NASA TM 105823, 1992.
- W.K. Binienda and S.M. Arnold, "Driving Force Analysis in an Infinite Anisotropic Plate with Multiple Crack Interactions," NASA TM 106838, January 1995.

Other Publications

- Mixed-Mode Fracture of Uniaxial Fiber Reinforced Composites, Defense Technical Information Center 1987 (współautorzy: A. S. Wang, E. S. Reddy, Y. Zhong)
- A Comprehensive Study on Damage Tolerance Properties of Notched Composite Laminates, Defense Technical Information Center 1988 (współautorzy: A. S. Wang, E. S. Reddy, U. Zhong)
- Frictionless Contact of Multilayered Composite Half Planes Containing Layers With Complex Eigenvalues, NASA Lewis Research Center 1997 (współautorzy: Wang Zhang, Marek-Jerzy Pindera)
- Analysis of an Interface Crack for a Functionally Graded Strip Sandwiched Between Two Homogeneous Layers of Finite Thickness, NASA Lewis Research Center 1999 (współautor: N. I. Shbeeb)
- Analysis of Multiple Cracks in an Infinite Functionally Graded Plate, NASA Lewis Research Center 1999 (współautorzy: N. I. Shbeeb, K. L. Kreider)
- Composite Materials and Analysis Techniques for Aerospace Application, ASCE, Aerospace Division 2002 (współautor: Marek-Jerzy Pindera)
- Advanced Materials and Structures in Civil and Aerospace Engineering, ASCE 2005
- Earth and Space 2006 – Engineering, Construction, and Operations in Challenging Environments, ASCE 2006 (red., współredaktorzy: R. B. Malla, A. K. Maji)
- Impact Mechanics of Composite Materials for Aerospace Application, ASCE 2008 (współautor: Pizhong Qiao)
- Earth and Space 2008 – Engineering, Science, Construction, and Operations in Challenging Environments, ASCE 2008 (red.)

== Membership ==
- ASME (American Society of Mechanical Engineers)
- ASCE (American Society of Civil Engineers; Fellow)
- AIAA (American Institute of Aeronautics and Astronautics)
- SAMPE (Society for the Advancement of Material and Process Engineering)
- Member of Lawrence Livermore National Laboratory Collaborator's Program
- Computational Mechanics (The University of Akron)

== Bibliography ==
- Biografia na stronie Kolegium Inżynierii University of Akron uakron.edu
- Profil na stronach Wydziału Inżynierii Cywilnej (Department of Civil Engineering) Kolegium Inżynierii University of Akron ecgf.uakron.edu
