= Robert Grzywna =

Polish pilot (1974–2010)

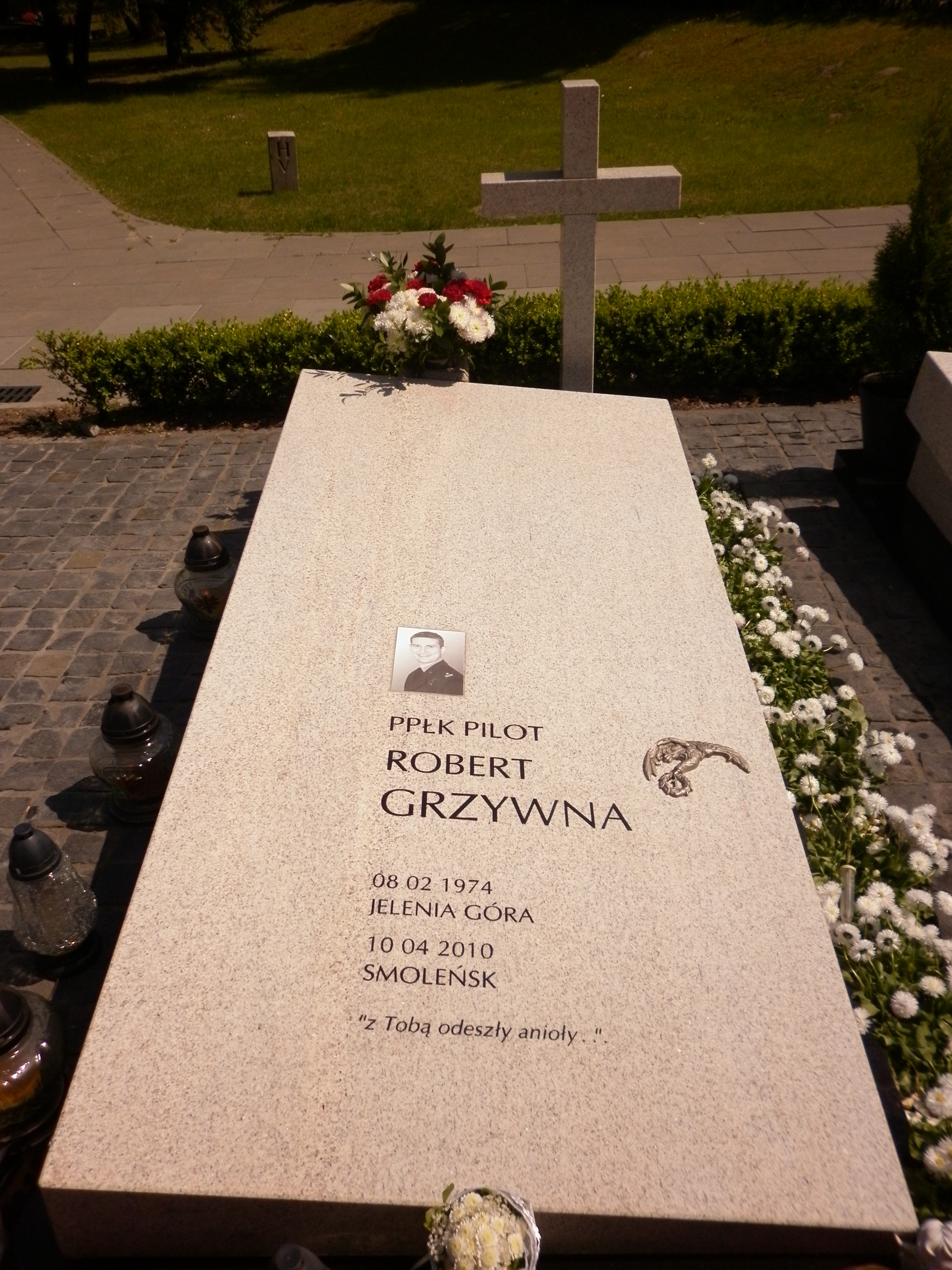
He is buried at the Powązki Military Cemetery

Robert Grzywna (8 February 1974 in Jelenia Góra – 10 April 2010) was a Polish pilot.

He died in the 2010 Polish Air Force Tu-154 crash near Smolensk on 10 April 2010. He was posthumously awarded the Order of Polonia Restituta.
