= Smolensk North Airport =

Airport in Smolensk, Russia

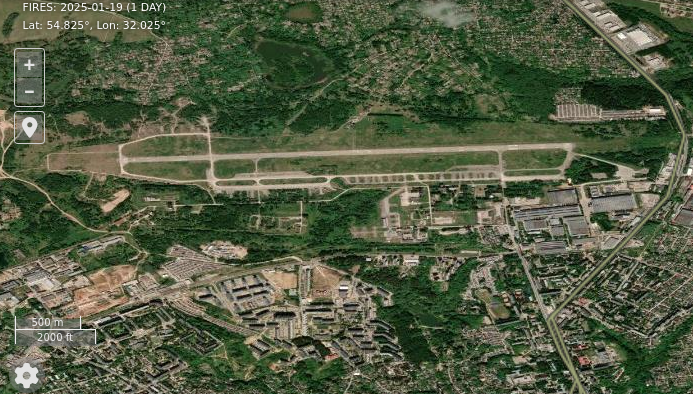
- Satellite imagery of Smolensk North Airport

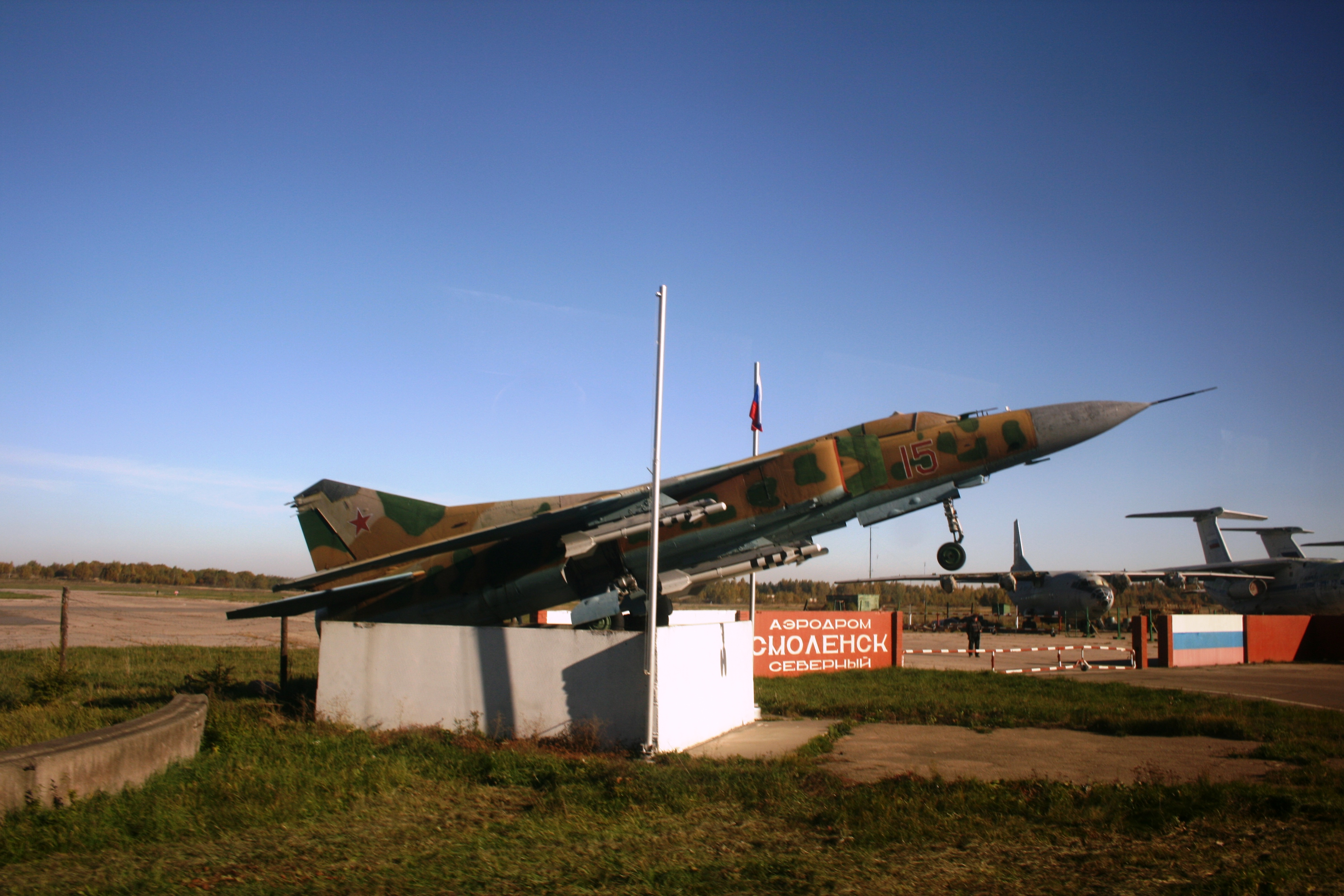
- IATA: LNX; ICAO: UUBS

Summary
- Airport type: Military and civilian
- Operator: Russian Air Force
- Location: Smolensk
- Time zone: UTC+3 (+3)
- Elevation AMSL: 820 ft / 250 m
- Coordinates: 54°49′30″N 32°1′30″E

Map
- Location of airport in Smolensk Oblast Smolensk North Airport (Russia)

Runways
Direction	Length		Surface
Direction	ft	m	Surface
08/26	8,202	2,500	Concrete

Smolensk North Airport (IATA: LNX, ICAO: UUBS) (Russian: военный аэродром "Смоленск-Северный", "Smolensk North Military Aerodrome") is a decommissioned military airbase in Smolensk Oblast, Russia, located 4 km north of the city of Smolensk. It is now used as Smolensk's sole airport for civil and military flights. It has a remote revetment area with 8 pads and a Yakovlev factory at the southeast side of the airfield, the Smolensk Aviation Plant.

== History ==
The military air base was originally built in the 1920s by the Soviet Union, and it eventually became a class 1 airfield with a runway 2500 m long and 49 m wide, capable of handling planes over 75 tons in weight.

Prior to 1991, it was home to the 401 IAP (401st Interceptor Aviation Regiment, disbanded around 1990), flying MiG-23P aircraft, and the 871 IAP, flying MiG-23 and Su-27.

From 1946 until 2009, the base hosted an airlift unit, the 103 Gv VTAP (103rd Guards Military Air Transport Regiment, full name in Russian: 103-й гвардейский Красносельский Краснознамённый военно-транспортный авиационный полк имени Героя Советского Союза В. С. Гризодубовой), flying Ilyushin Il-76 jets. At one point, about 28 Il-76 aircraft were based there.

The Russian Air Force regiment was disbanded in late 2009, and until 2010, there were no active units at the base except for a small airbase command post.

The airfield has been functioning in part as a civilian airport since October 2009.

On August 15, 2014, by order of the Government of the Russian Federation, the airfield was transferred from the state to the experimental one and under the jurisdiction of the Ministry of Industry and Trade of the Russian Federation. (In fact, the transfer of the airfield began in 2019).

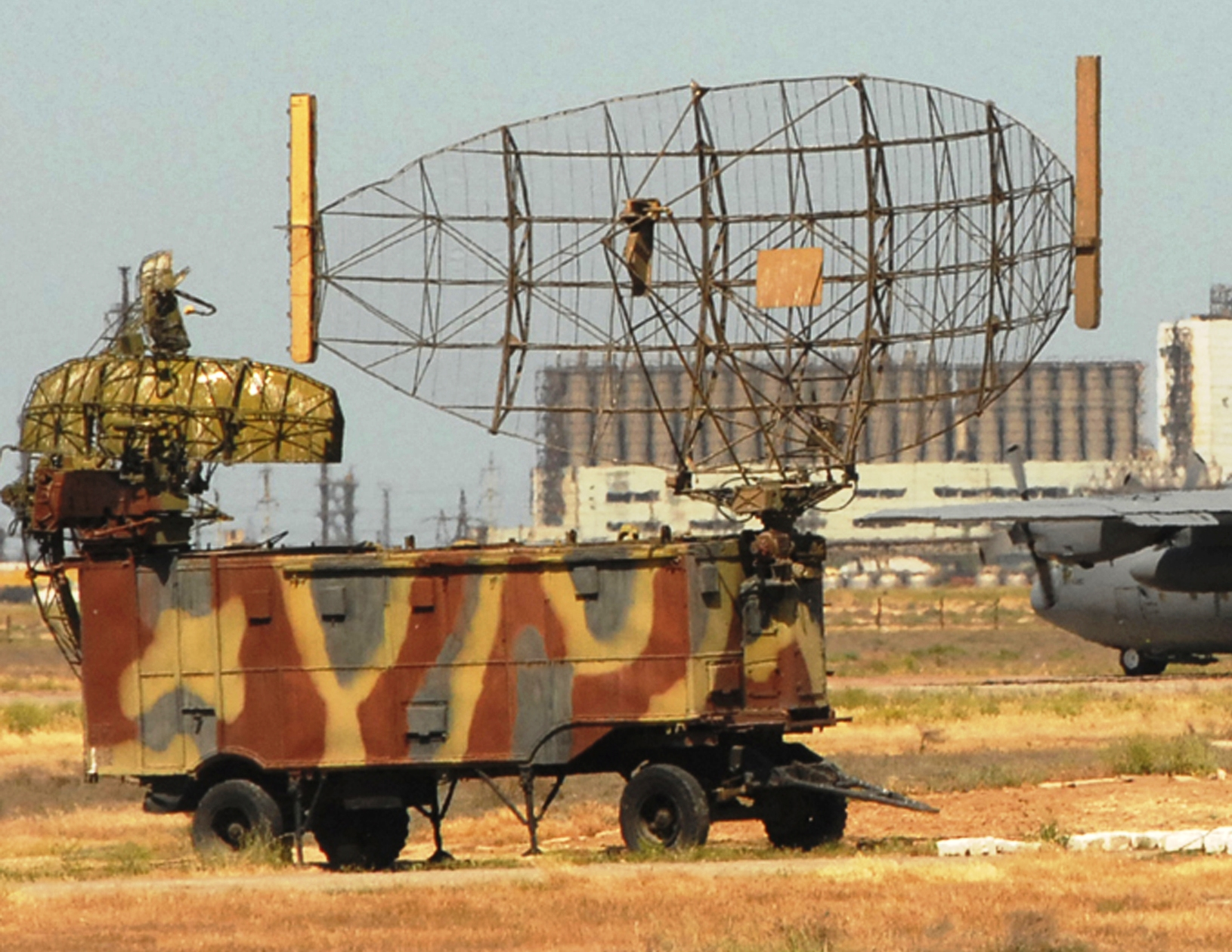
Military radar type RSP-6M, similar to the one used at Smolensk North Airport

== Accidents and incidents ==
A Polish government Tu-154M Lux carrying President Lech Kaczyński, his wife, and an official delegation crashed during the final approach to the airport on 10 April 2010. All 96 aboard perished.

== See also ==
- List of airports in Russia
