= Freedom of religion in Europe by country =

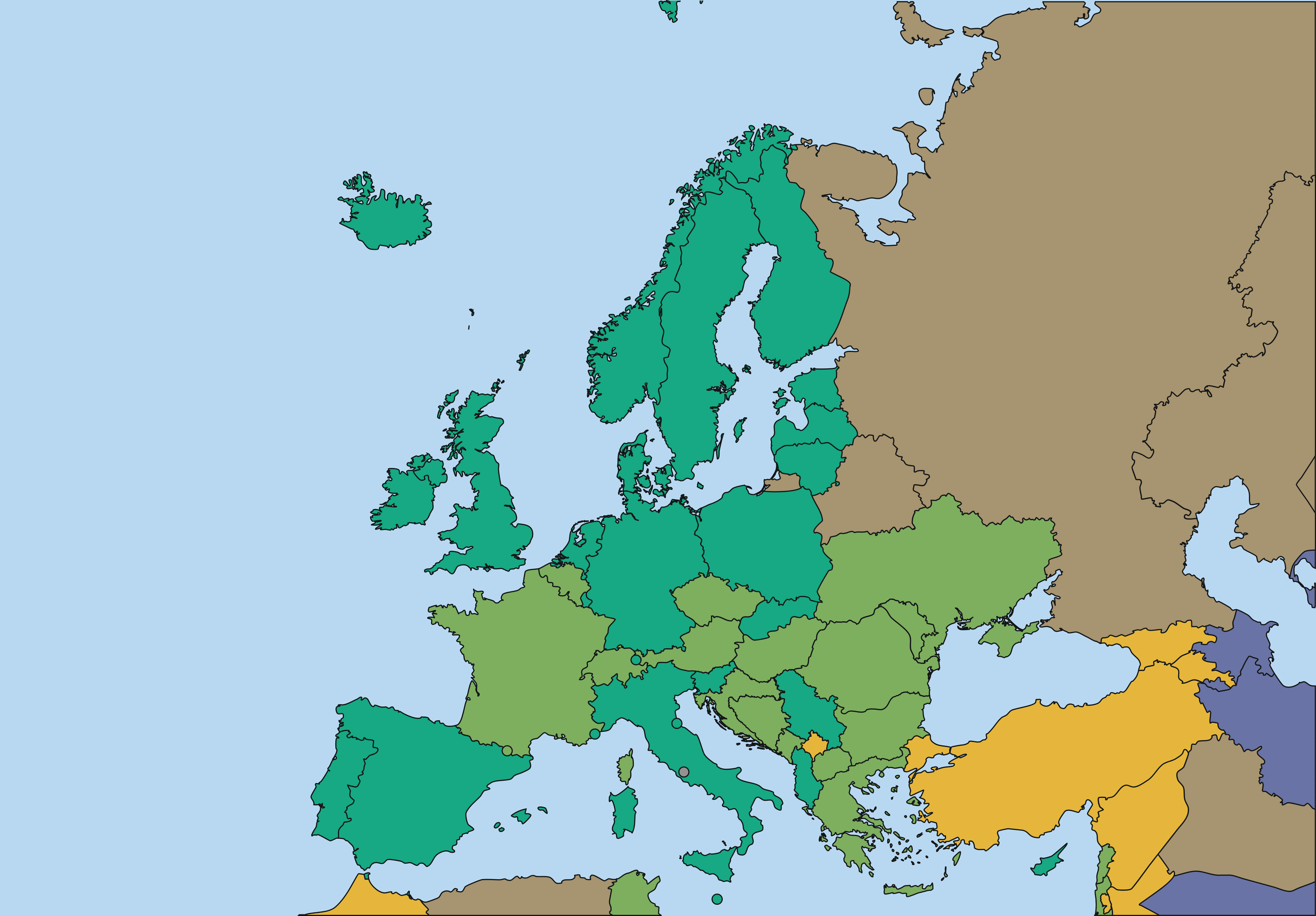
Freedom House's 2023 Freedom of Religion scores in Europe by country. 4 indicates the most religious freedom, whereas 0 indicates the least. 4 3 2 1 0 No score (Vatican City)

The status of religious freedom in Europe varies from country to country. States can differ based on whether or not they guarantee equal treatment under law for followers of different religions, whether they establish a state religion (and the legal implications that this has for both practitioners and non-practitioners), the extent to which religious organizations operating within the country are policed, and the extent to which religious law is used as a basis for the country's legal code.

There are further discrepancies between some countries' self-proclaimed stances of religious freedom in law and the actual practice of authority bodies within those countries: a country's establishment of religious equality in their constitution or laws does not necessarily translate into freedom of practice for residents of the country. Additionally, similar practices (such as having religious organizations register with the government) can have different consequences depending on other sociopolitical circumstances specific to the countries in question. Virtually every country in Europe legally establishes the freedom of religion for people living in the country, and most also have anti-discrimination laws that specifically highlight religious freedom. However, enforcement of these laws is not always consistent, and several countries routinely fail to implement these laws at a local level. A few countries in Europe continue to have state religions. Most countries in the former Eastern bloc have government programs for the restitution of religious property confiscated by previous socialist governments. Many countries in Europe also provide government funding or other privileges for registered religious groups. Several countries have animal slaughter laws that effectively ban butchers from making kosher and halal meat, and a smaller proportion ban non-medical circumcision, generally on the grounds of animal rights and human rights respectively. In most cases, religious individuals that need to observe these practices are able to import meat and go to other countries to have circumcisions performed without interference from their government.

Religious tolerance in general society varies across Europe. While some countries have a high degree of religious tolerance, others have significant levels of Anti-Muslim and anti-Jewish sentiments in the general populace, as well as discrimination against Jehovah's Witnesses, at times resulting in religiously-motivated physical violence or vandalism. In a few countries, particularly in former Yugoslav states, but also Ukraine, there are hostilities between Christian denominations connected to disputes between Orthodox churches over religious jurisdictions and the control of holy sites.

== Albania ==
The constitution of Albania provides for freedom of religion, and the government respects this right in practice. The government of Albania provides financial support to the Catholic Church, the Albanian Orthodox Church, Sunni Muslims, and Bektashi Sufi Muslims.

The government of Albania is in the process of returning property confiscated from religious organizations during the People's Socialist Republic of Albania (1944-1991). As of 2017, religious organizations have not prioritized engaging with the bureaucratic processes implemented by the government for the return of such property, and thus it remains in the government's possession.

In May 2017 United Nations Special Rapporteur on Freedom of Religion or Belief Ahmed Shaheed completed his assessment of the state of religious freedom in the country and stated, “Albania is a model for interfaith harmony.”

Public schools are secular, and the law prohibits religious instruction in them. Private schools may offer religious instruction.

In 2023, Albania scored 4 out of 4 for religious freedom.

== Andorra ==
The constitution of Andorra provides for freedom of religion, and the government generally respects this right in practice. There is no state religion; however, the constitution acknowledges a special relationship with the Roman Catholic Church, which receives some privileges not available to other religious groups, such as salaries and expedited citizenship for clergy.

One of the two Co-Princes of Andorra is the Bishop of Urgell, in whose diocese Andorra is located (the other is the President of France).

Muslim and Jewish communities in Andorra (populations 800-2000 and 100 respectively) have been requesting that local municipalities allocate land for Muslim and Jewish cemeteries, in order for them to be able to bury people according to their ritual customs. As of 2017, no municipality has accepted these requests, although non-Christians are allowed to use existing cemeteries. The Muslim and Jewish communities continue to use cemeteries in Toulouse, France and Barcelona, Spain in order to be able to follow their religious customs.

There are no mosques in Andorra, although there are two prayer rooms that are used by the Muslim community.

In 2023, the country was scored 3 out of 4 for religious freedom.

== Austria ==
Austria guarantees freedom of religion through various constitutional provisions and through membership in various international agreements. In Austria, these instruments are deemed to allow any religious group to worship freely in public and in private, to proselytize, and to prohibit discrimination against individuals because of their religious allegiances or beliefs. However, part of the Austrian constitutional framework is a system of cooperation between the government and recognized religious communities. The latter are granted preferential status by being entitled to benefits such as a tax-exempt status and public funding of religious education.

Currently, Austria recognizes twelve religions. In addition to various Christian denominations including Jehovah's Witnesses, these include Judaism, Buddhism, and Islam. To date, Austria has not granted full recognition to several newer and allegedly controversial religions such as the Church of Scientology. Some newer religious groups, however, have applied under the 1998 Act and thereby attained the preliminary status of communities of believers.

In October 2017, Austria passed a law banning the covering of one's face in public, which has been criticized as Islamophobic and a "criminalization of Muslim women" by various experts due to its effectively banning the usage of burqas and other similar clothing. There have been reports of antisemitism, and fascist sympathizers with connections to the Nazi Germany have held elected office as recently as 2008.

In 2023, the country was scored 3 out of 4 for religious freedom.

== Belarus ==
The Constitution of Belarus provides for freedom of religion. However, the government restricts religious freedom in accordance with the provisions of a 2002 law on religion and a 2003 concordat with the Belarusian Orthodox Church (BOC), a branch of the Russian Orthodox Church (ROC) and the only officially recognized Orthodox denomination. Although there is no state religion, the concordat grants the BOC privileged status.

Foreign missionaries, clergy, and humanitarian workers affiliated with churches faced delays with visa applications which impacted their work.

Belarus is the only country in Europe to have jailed a newspaper editor for publishing the Danish cartoons of the Islamic Prophet Muhammad. On January 18, 2008, Alexander Sdvizhkov was jailed for three years for 'incitement of religious hatred'.

In 2023, Freedom House rated Belarus’ religious freedom as 1 out of 4.

== Belgium ==
The constitution guarantees freedom of religion in Belgium, and the law prohibits discrimination based on religious orientation. There are, however, various laws prohibiting the operation of Muslim and Jewish religious slaughterhouses on animal cruelty grounds, as well as bans on Muslim veils and headscarves. Additionally, there have been several reports of antisemitic and anti-Muslim incidents, including hate speech, discrimination, and violence.

=== Legal framework ===
Belgian law states no individual may be barred from religious ceremonies or from observing religious days of rest, and bars the state from interfering in the appointment of religious clergy or blocking the publication of religious documents. It obligates the state to pay the salaries and pensions of religious clergy that are certified by the official organizations of recognized religions and employed in recognized houses of worship. Unrecognized groups do not receive government subsidies but may worship freely and openly. The law prohibits discrimination based on religious or philosophical (e.g., nonconfessional) orientation. Federal law prohibits public statements inciting religious hatred, including Holocaust denial.

In 2017, Wallonia and Flanders regional governments passed laws, scheduled to take effect in 2019, banning the ritual slaughter of animals without prior stunning, effectively outlawing kosher and halal practices.

In the continuing aftermath of 2016 terrorist attacks, the government extended its stated efforts to curb radical Islam, particularly following the release of a government report stating Wahhabism constituted a threat to the practice of moderate Islam in the country.

The government maintains a ban on Muslim women wearing headscarves in public sector jobs, and full-face veils (niqab) are banned in public.

=== Education ===
The constitution requires teaching in public schools to be neutral with respect to religious belief. All public schools offer mandatory religious instruction or, alternatively, "moral" instruction (which is oriented towards citizenship and moral values), although parents in schools in Flanders may have their children opt out of such courses. A constitutional court ruling in 2015 allows francophone community parents to opt out of primary school religion and ethics classes for their children, pursuant to the court's finding those classes not to be "objective, critical, and pluralistic."

Schools provide teachers for each of the recognized religious groups, as well as for secular humanism, according to the student's preference.

=== Societal attitudes ===
Unia, an anti-discrimination non-profit organization, reported it recorded 365 complaints of online hate speech in 2016 compared with 333 in 2015 (10 percent increase), with antisemitic and anti-Muslim hate speech representing the vast majority of cases. Unia reported an increase in antisemitic acts and threats from 57 in 2015 to 109 in 2016, the most recent year for which data were available.

Unia reported there were 88 complaints of workplace discrimination based on religion in 2016, the latest year for which data were available, compared with 46 in 2015. Most of these complaints involved reports of discrimination against Muslims, especially against Muslim women for wearing headscarves.

Jewish groups complained that Unia did not take antisemitism as seriously as other forms of discrimination. some Jewish leaders said there was a proliferation of online comments posted ostensibly as criticisms of the Israeli government but contained anti-Semitic elements such as rhetoric conflating Jews with Israeli government policy or blaming Jews for Israel's actions.

In September 2017 in Antwerp, a Belgian convert to Islam verbally and physically attacked a Jewish man.

At least 100 young Muslim and Jewish leaders from around Europe came together in Brussels for a "Joint Day of Action against Anti-Semitism and Anti-Muslim Hatred and Discrimination," organized by the Organization for Security and Cooperation in Europe Office of Democratic Institutions and Human Rights and EU bodies on May 30. European Muslim and Jewish participants raised concerns about what they characterized as the stark rise of antisemitism and anti-Muslim sentiment in European societies, primarily fueled by political campaign rhetoric.

In 2023, the country was scored 3 out of 4 for religious freedom.

== Bosnia and Herzegovina ==
The constitution of Bosnia and Herzegovina, as well as the constitutions of its two constituent entities, Republika Srpska and the Federation of Bosnia and Herzegovina, provide for freedom of religious thought and practice, prohibit religious discrimination, and allow registered religious organizations to operate freely. Religion and ethnicity are closely linked in Bosnia and Herzegovina, and tensions between ethnic groups result in discriminatory practices as well as vandalism against religious sites.

=== Legal framework ===
A provision in the state constitution establishes representation quotas in government for the three main ethnoreligious groups in Bosnia and Herzegovina, Bosniaks (predominantly Muslim, 51% of the population), Serbs (predominantly Serbian Orthodox Christian, 31% of the population), and Croats (predominantly Catholic, 15% of the population). As a consequence of these quotas, individuals belonging to religious minorities who are not members of the aforementioned ethnic groups cannot hold government office. According to a 2013 government census, 3% of the country's population belongs to minority religions.

In addition to Islam, Catholicism, and Serbian Orthodox Christianity, Judaism is recognized as a "traditional religion" of Bosnia and Herzegovina and is automatically recognized by the government. Other religious groups may register with the government provided that they have at least 300 adult citizen members, subject to approval by the Ministry of Justice.

The state recognizes the Islamic Community of Bosnia and Herzegovina as the sole supreme institutional religious authority for all Muslims, including immigrants and refugees, as well as for Bosniaks and other Muslim nationals living outside the country who accept the Islamic Community's authority. According to the law, no Islamic group may register with the Ministry of Justice or open a mosque without the permission of the Islamic Community. Some unregistered groups practice Islam independently of the Islamic Community. Such groups are predominantly Salafi in theological orientation.

=== Government practices ===
Observers reported government authorities were not enforcing the 2015 decision by the High Judicial and Prosecutorial Council prohibiting employees of judicial institutions from wearing any form of “religious insignia” at work, including headscarves.

According to officials of minority religious groups, local authorities discriminate against them with regard to the use of religious property and issuance of permits for new religious properties. Drvar municipal authorities refused construction permits for a new Catholic church, despite repeated requests from the local Catholic priest, the Banja Luka Catholic Diocese, and representatives from the Organization for Security and Co-operation in Europe, which became directly engaged on the issue. Municipal authorities also continued to refuse to return any of the Catholic Church's nationalized properties, according to Church officials in Banja Luka.

According to Catholic, Orthodox, and Jewish minorities, as well as Bosniak Muslims returning to a predominantly ethnic Serbian town, government authorities selectively enforced their rights, especially for refugees returning to their original communities pursuant to the Dayton Peace Agreement. Leaders of religious minority communities, particularly in Canton 10 in the western part of the Federation and several municipalities in eastern Republika Srpska, reported the failure of authorities to provide government services and protections to minorities, including access to health care, pensions, other social benefits, and the transfer of student records between districts. The leaders also said discrimination by local authorities continued when it came to providing police protection and investigating threats of violence, harassment, and vandalism. Because religion and ethnicity often are closely linked, it was difficult to categorize many actions as solely based on religious identity.

NGOs, academics, and government agencies reported the continued association of each of the country's major political parties with the religion practiced by the dominant ethnic group among its membership. The biggest ethnic Bosniak parties continued to align with the Islamic Community, the biggest ethnic Croat parties with the Catholic Church, and the two largest ethnic Serb parties with the Serbian Orthodox Church.

=== Education ===
The law affirms the right of every citizen to religious education. The law calls for a representative of each of the officially registered religious communities to be responsible for teaching religious studies in all public and private pre-, primary, and secondary schools and universities. Children from minority religious groups are entitled to religious education only when there are 18 or more students from that religious group in one class. Religious communities select and train their respective religious education teachers. These individuals are employees of the schools where they teach, but they receive accreditation from the religious body governing the curriculum.

Secondary students who do not wish to attend the religion class have the right to opt out if their school offers a class in ethics as an alternative, which many schools do. Parents of primary school students may request their child be exempted from religion class.

According to nongovernmental organizations, provisions of the law regarding the religious education of returnee children remained unimplemented, particularly in segregated school systems, often at the behest of senior government authorities seeking to obstruct the process. Parents of more than 500 Bosniak children, who returned to their prewar homes in several Republika Srpska communities, continued to boycott public schools for a fifth year, choosing instead to send their children to alternative schools organized on the premises of the Islamic Community's administrative building and supported by the Federation Ministry of Education. Academic and NGO representatives reported continued social pressure on students from both majority and minority religious communities to attend instruction in their respective religions.

=== Societal attitudes ===
In October 2016 the Bosniak-dominated Sarajevo Canton Assembly renamed a street and an elementary school after Mustafa Busuladzic, a World War II-era antisemite who glorified Hitler. The president of the Jewish Community strongly condemned the act. Proponents claimed Busuladzic was not an antisemite despite his public support for the fascist Ustashe Movement.

==== Religious violence ====
While the Interreligious Council of Bosnia and Herzegovina as of 2017 had registered nearly 200 incidences of violence against religious officials and sites since 2010, police identified the perpetrators in only 55 cases and courts prosecuted only 23 cases. According to the Interreligious Council, this low rate of prosecution reflects an ignorance about hate crime and a tendency to deflect criticism of religious intolerance.

Incidents of vandalism against the religious sites of all of the three primary religions of Bosnia and Herzegovina, as well as against Jewish religious sites and property belonging to the Interreligious Council.

In 2023, the country scored 3 out of 4 for religious freedom.

== Bulgaria ==
The constitution of Bulgaria provides for freedom of religion, and other laws and policies contributed to the generally free practice of religion. However, the constitution designates Eastern Orthodox Christianity as the "traditional" religion, exempting it from having to register in court as required for all other religious groups.

In 2022, there were reports of societal abuses or discrimination based on religious affiliation, belief, or practice; in particular, there was an increasing number of antisemitic hate speech and graffiti, as well as vandalism against mosques and attacks on Jehovah's Witnesses.

In 2023, the country was scored 3 out of 4 for religious freedom;

== Croatia ==
The Constitution of Croatia provides for freedom of religion.

The Catholic Church in Croatia receives state financial support and other benefits established in concordats between the Government and the Vatican. The concordats and other government agreements with non-Catholic religious communities allow state financing for some salaries and pensions for religious officials through government-managed pension and health funds.

The Serbian Orthodox Church reports some difficulties in legal restitution regarding properties seized by the Yugoslav authorities.

In 2023, the country was scored 3 out of 4 for religious freedom.

== Czech Republic ==
Articles 15 and 16 of the Charter of Fundamental Rights and Freedoms (part of the constitutional system of the Czech Republic) include following statements: "The freedom of thought, conscience, and religious conviction is guaranteed. Everyone has the right to change her religion or faith or to have no religious conviction." and "Everyone has the right freely to manifest her religion or faith, either alone or in community with others, in private or public, through worship, teaching, practice, or observance."

In 2023, the country was scored 3 out of 4 for religious freedom.

== Denmark ==
Denmark has freedom of worship, however the Church of Denmark does hold certain privileges. According to the Constitution of Denmark, the Evangelical Lutheran Church in Denmark is the state church of Denmark and receives some subsidies from the government. The constitution also mandates that the Danish monarch must be a member of the state church.

Anti-Muslim organizations such as Pegida have organized demonstrations in Denmark in the 21st century, at times met by counter-protests. The right-wing populist Danish People's Party has at times self-described as an anti-Muslim party.

In 2023, the country was scored 4 out of 4 for religious freedom.

== Estonia ==
Article 40 The Constitution of the Republic of Estonia reads: "Everyone has freedom of conscience, religion and thought. Everyone may freely belong to churches and religious societies. There is no state church. Everyone has the freedom to exercise his or her religion, both alone and in community with others, in public or in private, unless this is detrimental to public order, health or morals."

In 2023, the country was scored 4 out of 4 for religious freedom.

== Finland ==
As the national churches of Finland, the Evangelical Lutheran Church of Finland and the Finnish Orthodox Church have a status protected by law. The special legal position of the Evangelical Lutheran Church of Finland is also codified in the constitution of Finland. Both churches have the right to levy an income tax on their members and every Finnish company as a part of Corporation Tax. The tax is collected by the state. The administration of the national churches is regulated by their respective church laws, which are drafted by the churches and enacted or rejected by the parliament. State universities, religiously non-aligned in themselves, provide the theological education that is required to be ordained as clergy of the national churches. The general direction has been to restrict and remove the privileges of the national churches, and as of 2004, in most other official business (such as officiating marriages) any registered religious community has a status comparable to that of the national churches.

In 2020, Juhani Pohjola, the head of the Evangelical Lutheran Mission Diocese of Finland was investigated by the Prosecutor General of Finland and summoned to testify by the Helsinki Police Department for being “suspected of being guilty of incitement to hatred against a group" for placing a small booklet authored in 2004 on a website and distributing it through the church. The booklet summarized traditionalist doctrine on marriage and sexual matters; this included the statement that Leviticus 18:22, which instructs the reader to murder people who engage in homosexual behaviour, is the word of Christ. In 2022, Pohjola was prosecuted along with the article's author Päivi Räsänen. Pohjola and Räsänen were found innocent by both the Helsinki district court and the Helsinki court of appeal; consequently, the prosecutor applied to the Supreme Court of Finland for permission to appeal against the decision, which was given in 2024.

=== Religion in schools ===
Teaching Christianity in schools continued after they became a part of municipal jurisdiction in 1866. Students, who were not members of either national church, gained the lawful right to be freed from such teaching with §8 of the Act of Religious Freedom of 1922 (Finnish: Uskonnonvapauslaki, Swedish: Religionsfrihetslagen). The legal guardian of the pupil had to apply for the pupil to be freed. Requirements for teacher competency for the teaching of religion and the corresponding subject for freed students "The history of religions and ethics" (Finnish: Uskontojen historia ja siveysoppi, Swedish: Religionshistoria och etik) have also varied.

Since 2003, world view related teaching is compulsory for all students in basic education (primary and secondary school). Each primary and secondary school municipality must arrange teaching in the religion that the majority of the students in the municipality are members of. Also, for every group of at least three students who belong to some other organized religion, teaching in their own religion must be arranged. For a group of at least three students within the municipality who do not belong to any organized religion, teaching in the subject "ethics" (Finnish: elämänkatsomustieto, Swedish: livsåskådningskunskap), must be arranged. If there are too few students for a teaching group for the student's own religion to be arranged, the student (or as most such students are minors, their parents) can choose between joining the teaching group for the majority religion, requesting ethics education or arranging the teaching from their own religious organization. A teaching group for a minority religion or for ethics can be arranged for several schools together.

Current teacher education in Finland gives primary and secondary school teachers a basic competence to teach the national churches' religion, major world religions and ethics as school subjects. However, it is also noted that a teacher should not have to teach a particular religion if they object to it on the basis of conscience. Any conflicts between students' right to education and teachers' religious freedom should be solved on a case-by-case basis.

=== Freedom of religion ===
In 2023, the country was scored 4 out of 4 for religious freedom.

== France ==
The Constitution of France provides for the free exercise of religious worship. However, according to Pew Research Center in 2017, France has a high level of government restrictions on religion.

Since 1905, France has had a law requiring separation of church and state, prohibiting the state from recognizing or funding any religion. The 1905 law on secularity was highly controversial at the time, but today is held as a founding document of French secularism or laïcité. Some French politicians and communities have more recently questioned the law, arguing that, despite its explicit stance for state secularism, it de facto favors traditional French religions, in particular the Catholic Church, at the expense of more recently established religions, such as Islam. The law provides for the transfer to the state of religious property built before 1905, with the local governments being expected to maintain the buildings at taxpayer's expense. Despite being state property, these buildings are available for religious use, provided that their use has been historically continuous. As most Roman Catholic churches in the country were built well before the enactment of the 1905, they are supported by the government. With the exception of the historically anomalous Alsace-Lorraine, followers of Islam and other religions more recently implanted in France instead have to build and maintain religious facilities at their own expense. In 2016, President Hollande proposed a temporary ban on foreign funding for mosques and shut down at least 20 mosques found to be "preaching radical Islamic ideology".

In 2004, France passed a law banning the use of "conspicuous" religious symbols in public schools, including the hijab. Many Muslims complained that the law infringed on their freedom of religion. Similarly the Muslim Public Affairs Council called the ban "a major affront to freedom of religion", noting that many Muslims believe it is mandated by religious texts. Human Rights Watch and The United States Commission on International Religious Freedom expressed concern and disapproval at the law's passing.

On 14 September 2010, an act of parliament was passed resulting in the ban on the wearing of face-covering headgear, including masks, helmets, balaclava, niqābs and other veils covering the face in public places, except under specified circumstances. The ban also applies to the burqa, a full-body covering, if it covers the face.

=== Freedom of religion ===
In 2023, the country was scored 3 out of 4 for religious freedom. The bans on religious symbols and face coverings, like niqabs and burqas, in public places limit some aspects of religious freedom and expression.

== Georgia ==
The Constitution of Georgia provides for freedom of religion, and the government generally respects this right in practice. However, some societal abuses of the freedom of religion have occurred. Georgia de facto lost control of the regions of Abkhazia and South Ossetia in 1993 and 1992 respectively, and does not exert control of these regions despite claiming them de jure.

Minority religious groups are viewed by some Georgians as a threat to Georgian national identity, cultural values, and the Georgian Orthodox Church. Between 1999 and 2002, followers of a defrocked former Georgian Orthodox priest, Basil Mkalavishvili, attacked congregations of Jehovah's Witnesses and Baptists in Tbilisi. In 2011, eight members of Orthodox fundamentalist groups were sentenced to prison for breaking into a television station and assaulting participants on a talk show on religious freedom; however, after the October 2012 parliamentary election and the transition to a new government, these individuals were reclassified as "prisoners of conscience" and were freed as part of a general amnesty. In November 2012, Muslims in a western Georgian community were prevented from gathering for prayer by Orthodox priests and townspeople; the local priest said that the local residents "would not allow any minarets and mass prayers in this village", and the police did not intervene. During 2022, Jehovah's Witnesses reported nine incidences of threats and vandalism; in the same year, a man was sentenced to prison for threatened a Muslim leader during a service at a mosque.

In 2023, the country was scored 2 out of 4 for religious freedom.

=== Abkhazia ===
The Abkhazian Orthodox Church operates outside the official Eastern Orthodox ecclesiastical hierarchy, as all Eastern Orthodox churches recognise Abkhazia as belonging to the jurisdiction of the Georgian Orthodox church. The Georgian Orthodox Church lost effective control over the Sukhumi-Abkhazian eparchy following the 1992-1993 war in Abkhazia, when ethnically Georgian priests had to flee Abkhazia. It maintains its structures in exile, where the current head is Archbishop Daniel. The Abkhazian Orthodox Church came into existence when the ethnically Abkhaz branch of the Sukhumi-Abkhazian Eparchy declared on 15 September 2009 that it no longer considered itself part of the Georgian Orthodox Church and that it was re-establishing the Catholicate of Abkhazia disbanded in 1795.

Jehovah's Witnesses are officially banned, but in the past some communities in some parts of Abkhazia have been able to establish working relationships with local authorities and have thereby been able to hold some meetings.

=== South Ossetia ===
The Georgian Orthodox Church has experienced interference from the de facto government of South Ossetia, which has banned Orthodox services in several ethnic Georgian villages; however, de facto authorities have allowed them to conduct services there. Jehovah's Witnesses in "South Ossetia" are not officially recognized; however, they are able to assemble freely in Akhalgori.

== Germany ==
The government prohibits religious discrimination and provides for freedom of faith and conscience and the practice of one’s religion.

Today, church and state are "separate," but there is cooperation in many fields, most importantly in the social sector. Churches and religious communities, if they are large, stable and loyal to the constitution, can get special status from the state as a "corporation under public law" which allows the churches to levy taxes called Kirchensteuer (literally church tax) on their members. This revenue is collected by the state for a cost-covering fee. Payment of this tax is not voluntary for adherents of the respective religion who are otherwise obligated to pay taxes. Since one's religion is officially recorded, exemption from this tax is possible only through leaving one's religion. Being a member of one's own religious tradition in Germany therefore requires monetary payment to the respective ecclesiastical body (and, indirectly, a small portion to the state).

Religious instruction (for members of the respective religions) is an ordinary subject in public schools (in most states). It is organized by the state, but also under the supervision of the respective religious community. Teachers are educated at public universities, in departments that are nevertheless affiliated with a specific church (Protestant or Catholic) or with confessional Islam. Parents, or students 14 years old and above, can decide not to take those religion classes, but most federal states require classes in "ethics" or "philosophy" as replacements. A small but significant number of religious schools, which receive the majority of their funding (but never all of it) from the state, exist in most parts of the country; however nobody can be compelled to attend them. There was considerable public controversy when the Federal Constitutional Court declared a Bavarian law requiring a crucifix in every classroom to be unconstitutional in 1997; Bavaria replaced it with a law still demanding the same, unless parents file a formal protest with the state.

According to preliminary government figures, in 2022, there were over 2,500 antisemitic crimes reported; the government also reported that in 2021, there were 732 crimes targeting Muslims and over 100 anti-Christian crimes.

In 2023, the country was scored 4 out of 4 for religious freedom.

== Greece ==
The Constitution of Greece establishes the Church of Greece as the "dominant" religion of Greece. Article 13 of the Constitution of Greece further guarantees the freedom of religion for all Greeks, although it also outlaws proselytism.

Orthodox, Catholic, and Jewish schools operate in the country as well as two Islamic religious schools in Thrace. Religious instruction is mandatory for all school pupils studying at grade three and higher, and students are taught the tenets of the Orthodox Christian faith (or, respectively, Islam, for the Muslim religious minority in Thrace) and general things about other religions and faiths. Typically, one hour per week (out of the 32-hour program of studies) is devoted to these lessons. However, students and parents can choose to opt out of religious instruction. The Lord's Prayer or another prayer is typically recited before lessons, once a day, but school prayer attendance is not mandatory.

An estimated 81.6 percent of the population identifies itself as Greek Orthodox. The 1923 Treaty of Lausanne created an officially recognized "Muslim minority," which consists of an estimated 140,000 to 150,000 individuals (approximately 1.3 percent of the Greek population) residing in Thrace. The government supports the Orthodox Church financially by paying for clergy salaries, church maintenance, and exempting the Church from taxes on its property.

Das Leben des Jesus (The Life of Jesus), a satire which portrays Jesus as an incense-addicted hippy, was banned in Greece in 2005 under a blasphemy statute, while its writer, Gerhard Haderer, received a suspended six-month jail sentence. However, both the ban and sentence were repealed on appeal and the book has circulated freely since.

In 2006 an Athens court decreed the official recognition of the ancient Greek pantheon as a "known religion".

In 2023, the country was scored 3 out of 4 for religious freedom; it was noted that the salaries and pensions of Orthodox clery are paid for by the state.

== Hungary ==
Hungary's laws establish the freedom of religion and belief, as well as prohibiting religious discrimination. Despite this, the government has selectively enforced some of these provisions, and significant portions of the country's population harbor anti-Jewish and anti-Muslim sentiments, with both communities facing harassment, discrimination, and violence. Government officials up to and including Prime Minister Viktor Orbán have made statements which have been criticized as anti-Muslim and anti-Jewish, although the government has also taken steps to support the Jewish community in Hungary.

=== Legal framework ===
The Fundamental Law of Hungary, the country's constitution, provides for freedom of conscience and religion, including freedom to choose or change religion or belief, and the freedom to manifest religion or belief through religious acts or ceremonies, or in any other way, in worshipping, practice, and observance. It prohibits religious discrimination as well as speech “aimed at violating the dignity” of any religious community.

The constitution's preamble states that “We recognize the role of Christianity” in preserving the nation and “value the various religious traditions” in the country. The constitution stipulates separation between religious communities and state and the autonomy of religious groups. According to the constitution, the state may, at the request of religious communities, cooperate with them on community goals.

Implementing legislation provides for a dual system of religious communities, consisting of “incorporated churches” with which the state cooperates on community goals as outlined in the constitution, and “organizations engaged in religious activity”. Neither category is limited to Christian organizations. Religious organizations acquire incorporated church status through an application submitted to the Ministry of Human Capacities and, if found eligible, by a subsequent two-thirds vote of parliament. However, despite an official 60 day deadline for the parliamentary decision, as of 2017 the Parliament of Hungary has failed to vote on 14 applications previously approved by the MHC. Eligibility criteria evaluated by the MHC include the length of time that the religious organization has existed, the number of followers within Hungary, and the establishment of formal bylaws and religious practices. A 2014 European Court of Human Rights decision found some of the eligibility criteria to be a violation of the state's obligation to be neutral and impartial with respect to religions, a decision which was echoed by a 2015 decision made by the Constitutional Court of Hungary.

The law lists 27 incorporated churches, including the Catholic Church, a variety of Protestant denominations, a range of Orthodox Christian groups, other Christian denominations such as the Church of Jesus Christ of Latter-day Saints, Seventh-day Adventists, the Salvation Army, several Jewish groups, and the Hungarian Society for Krishna Consciousness, the sole registered Hindu organization. The list also includes Buddhist and Muslim umbrella organizations, each encompassing a few individual groups, bringing the total number on the registered list of incorporated churches to 32. A 2011 law on religion automatically deregistered more than 300 religious groups and organizations which had previously had incorporated church status.

The Hungarian Civil Liberties Union reports that unregistered religious organizations enjoy protection for faith-related services. Unregistered groups are allowed to function and to worship but lack legal status and the rights and privileges granted exclusively to registered religious communities.

Citizens of Hungary are allowed to allocate 1 percent of their taxes to an incorporated church, in addition to 1 percent that can go to any non-governmental organization (including religious organizations). This provision has been ruled unconstitutional due to its preferential treatment for incorporated churches by the Constitutional Court of Hungary, but as of the end of 2017 the government has not made any changes due to this ruling.

=== Government actions ===
In 2017 The Constitutional Court ruled in April that the ban passed in 2016 by the town of Ásotthalom on the wearing of burqas and chadors and on the call to prayer by muezzins was unconstitutional. The court said local authorities could not pass regulations directly affecting a basic right or restricting it.

The government has consistently provided approximately 94 percent of its total financial support to incorporated churches and other religious groups to the Roman Catholic Church, the Hungarian Reformed Church, the Lutheran Church, and the Jewish community, which it considered to be the country's four “historical” religious groups, an unofficial designation the media also used. According to the government, more than 94 percent of citizens who reported a religious affiliation were affiliated with the four historical religious groups.

Some incorporated churches have expressed concern that if they spoke out on issues of public importance, the government would withdraw some of its financial support, which in many cases constituted two thirds or more of the churches’ total funding.

There have been numerous reports of perceived anti-Muslim rhetoric by government officials and politicians, including Prime Minister Viktor Orbán and other prominent members of the ruling Fidesz party. Muslim groups criticized as anti-Muslim the government's statements portraying asylum seekers and migrants, most of whom were Muslim, as dangerous for the future of the country and Europe and unable to integrate into European society.

Prime Minister Orbán has also made several public statements which have been called antisemitic by various sources, including Vice-President of the European Commission Frans Timmermans and the Federation of Jewish Communities in Hungary. These statements included a campaign against the Hungarian American and Jewish businessperson George Soros (which Federation of Jewish Communities president Andras Heisler described as "not anti-Semitic ... but could lead to anti-Semitic acts" in an open letter condemning the campaign) and calling Miklós Horthy, an ally of Nazi Germany an "exceptional statesman". Orbán has also made statements condemning Hungary's participation in the Holocaust and claiming that the country today has a "zero tolerance policy" toward antisemitism, which Heisler welcomed while describing the government's overall attitude as consisting of "two-faced assessments of the Holocaust".

The government is engaged in various legal disputes with the Church of Scientology–government investigations and audits of the Church of Scientology have been criticized by the group as a violation of its religious freedom, and the Church was one of the 300 religious groups that was deregistered in 2011.

=== Societal attitudes ===
Both Muslims and Jews have been targets for assault, discriminatory treatment, hate speech, and vandalism. Muslim organization leaders have asserted that many members of their community do not bother reporting anti-Muslim incidents because they do not believe that the police would address them seriously.

A poll of approximately 1,000 persons conducted by Zavecz Research in April 2017 found 60 percent of respondents considered Muslims to be very dangerous for the future of the country and 22 percent as slightly dangerous. Twenty-seven percent of respondents perceived Jews as very dangerous and 21 percent as slightly dangerous. In its 2016 report on antisemitism The Action and Protection Foundation (based on a survey conducted by the Median Opinion and Market Research Institute), it concluded that approximately one third of citizens harbored antisemitic views, with around one-fifth of Hungarian citizens agreeing with various forms of Holocaust denial.

On February 6, 2017, approximately 600 members of extreme right organizations, including neo-Nazis and sympathizers of the country's WWII-era, Nazi-collaborationist Arrow Cross Party, rallied in a prominent park in Budapest and other cities around the country for a "Day of Honor" commemoration of the victims of a failed attempt by German and Hungarian troops to break through Soviet lines besieging Budapest in 1945.

The Attila Hotel and Restaurant in Budapest's 3rd District unveiled a bust in tribute to WWII Regent Horthy in its courtyard on June 17. The mayor and village council of Perkáta approved another bust of Horthy in May but, due to protests, revoked their approval; that bust was instead placed in a private castle in Káloz.

=== Freedom of religion ===
In 2023, the country was scored 3 out of 4 for religious freedom.

== Iceland ==
Freedom of religion in Iceland is guaranteed by the 64th article of the Constitution of Iceland. However at the same time the 62nd article states that the Evangelical Lutheran Church shall be the national church (Þjóðkirkja) and the national curriculum places emphasis on Christian studies.

A congregation tax is collected by the state on behalf of registered religious and life stance groups. For those belonging to an unregistered or unrecognized group, as well as unaffiliated, that tax goes to the national treasury.

In 2023, the country was scored 4 out of 4 for religious freedom.

== Ireland ==
The constitution of the Republic of Ireland provides for freedom of religion and prohibits discrimination on the basis of religion. Religious groups are not required to register with the government.

In 2022, national schools were 90 percent Catholic, 6 percent Church of Ireland, 2 percent multidenominational, 1 percent other religious groups, and 1 percent not religiously affiliated; the state funds private primary schools, 90 percent of which belong to Roman Catholic Church. In the same year, Atheist Ireland asked the United Nations to raise the issue of religious discrimination in national schools with the Irish government.

The police’s National Diversity and Integration Unit (GNDIU) liaison officers engage regularly with immigrant minority religious groups to inform them of police services and to educate them on their rights; in 2022, Irish Network against Racism recorded 600 incidents of racism, but noted that many of these were not reported to the police.

In 2023, the country was scored 4 out of 4 for religious freedom.

== Italy ==
In Italy there is not a state religion, however the Catholic Church enjoys a special status due to its historical political authority and its sovereign status, both of which other religions do not have. The Constitution recognises the Lateran Treaty of 1929, later modified in 1984, which gave this special status to the Catholic Church, but also recognizes the separation of church and state, as stated in Article 7:

The State and the Catholic Church are independent and sovereign, each within its own sphere. Their relations are regulated by the Lateran pacts. Amendments to such Pacts which are accepted by both parties shall not require the procedure of constitutional amendments.

Freedom of religion is enshrined in Article 8, which also gives the possibility to make arrangements with the State to other religions, not only Catholicism:

All religious denominations are equally free before the law. Denominations other than Catholicism have the right to self-organisation according to their own statutes, provided these do not conflict with Italian law. Their relations with the State are regulated by law, based on agreements with their respective representatives.

Under the Eight per thousand system, Italian taxpayers can choose to whom devolve a compulsory 8‰ = 0.8% (eight per thousand) from their annual income tax return between an organised religion recognised by Italy or, alternatively, to a welfare program run by the government.

In 2023, the country was scored 4 out of 4 for religious freedom.

== Kosovo ==
Kosovo's legal framework establishes a division between church and state, guarantees religious freedom, and prohibits discrimination on religious grounds. However, parts of the government bureaucracy are sometimes enforced selectively on religious lines, particularly at the municipal level. Religious leaders generally report good relations between ethnoreligious groups, but tensions persist and there are incidences of harassment, vandalism and violence between ethnoreligious groups.

=== Legal framework ===
The constitution of Kosovo provides for freedom of conscience and religion for all residents, including the right to change, express, or not express religious belief; to practice or abstain from practicing religion; and to join or refuse to join a religious community. These rights are subject to limitations for reasons of public safety and order or for the protection of the health or rights of others. The constitution guarantees equal rights for all religious communities, stipulates the country is secular and neutral with regard to religion, declares the state shall ensure the protection and preservation of the country's religious heritage, and prohibits discrimination based on religion.

The constitution stipulates communities traditionally present in the country, including religious communities, shall have specific rights, including maintaining, developing, and preserving their religion; using their own language; establishing and managing their own private schools with financial assistance from the state; and having access to public media.

The constitution provides for the establishment of an ombudsperson's institution, which is responsible for monitoring religious freedom among other human rights and recommending actions to correct violations. It stipulates the state shall take all necessary measures to protect individuals who may be subject to threats, hostility, discrimination, or violence because of their religious identity.

While Kosovo has no official religion, it has five “traditional” religious communities: the Islamic Community of Kosova, the Serbian Orthodox Church, the Catholic Church, the Jewish community, and the evangelical community. The law provides extra protections and benefits to these five groups, such as reduced taxes and relief from water tariffs.

Due to the strict separation of church and state, religious organizations have reported that they have difficulty conducting business and otherwise engage with the state, including the ability to register property and pay employees. Religious leaders have advocated for the government to grant religious organizations a special legal status that would aid their ability to conduct their operations.

=== Government practices ===
Some school officials continue to apply a mandatory administrative instruction previously issued by the Ministry of Education, Science, and Technology that prohibits primary and secondary students from wearing religious garb on school property. According to the Islamic Community of Kosova and other Muslim community leaders, public schools occasionally sent home students who insisted on wearing headscarves while attending classes. Members of the Islamic Community reported some public schools forced girls to remove headscarves in order to study in these schools.

Religious groups have complained that government authorities did not take steps to ensure municipalities treated religious organizations equally on property issues, in particular with regard to churches and cemeteries. Although the law specifies that municipalities hold title to cemeteries and are responsible for their upkeep, in practice, some municipalities allowed religious groups to take de facto possession of public cemeteries.

Existing Jewish cemeteries were reportedly in disrepair. Members of the Jewish community said they lacked the resources to maintain their cemeteries and local authorities did not maintain these public sites as required by law. The Serbian Orthodox cemetery in Pristina was reportedly also in disrepair and not maintained by municipal authorities. The Serbian Orthodox Church cited member displacement from the area as a reason for its inability to care adequately for the cemetery. In both cases, the Municipality of Pristina has denied that these cemeteries were in disrepair.

The Pristina Municipality, citing the lack of a construction permit, has prevented Serbian Orthodox monks from cleaning and making light repairs at the unfinished St. Saviors Church after vandals set fire to it in 2016.

=== Societal attitudes ===
Leaders of different religious groups reported generally good relations with one another and participated in numerous interfaith discussions on property rights, legislative priorities, and local community issues. However, incidents of vandalism and violence between ethnoreligious groups (and particularly between Albanian Muslims and Serb Serbian Orthodox Christians) continue to occur.

Both the Serbian Orthodox Church and the Islamic Community have accused the media of portraying their community in a negative light.

The former head imam of the Grand Mosque of Pristina, Shefqet Krasniqi, was charged by the Special Prosecution Office for using his sermons to encourage people to travel to conflict zones such as Iraq and Syria to incite terror. As a consequence of Krasniqi's actions, he was arrested in 2014 and dismissed from his position in 2015, with the Special Prosecution Office filing charges in 2017. Other imams have also been charged with inciting terrorism.

On January 6, 2017 (Orthodox Christmas Eve), approximately a dozen VV activists protested the visit of 50 displaced ethnic Serb pilgrims to the Serbian Orthodox church in Gjakove, alleging war criminals were among the group. Protesters threw stones and red paint at the visitors’ bus, damaging one window, and spray-painted “murderer” on the church's outer wall. Police dispersed protesters and arrested seven for disobeying police orders and vandalism.

On February 14, 2017, a group of 20 ethnic Albanians chanted anti-Serb slogans and sprayed anti-Serb graffiti in an ethnic Serb area of Gjilan, including on the Serbian Orthodox church and a Serbian-language school's outer walls. Graffiti included “Kill Serbs,” a swastika, and “UCK – Kosovo Liberation Army,” which is associated with ethnic Albanian nationalism.

On April 15, 2017, police arrested an ethnic Serb for attacking a mosque in Llabjan village, Novo Brdo. Ethnic Serb leaders condemned the attack.

=== Freedom of religion ===
In 2023, the country was scored 2 out of 4 for religious freedom.

== Latvia ==
Latvia's constitution and laws establish the freedom of religion and the separation of church and state. Eight "traditional" religious groups are accorded with some additional privileges, but other religious groups are largely free to practice their faith. Hate speech is criminalized. There are instances of anti-Jewish and anti-Muslim sentiment, particularly on the internet, and nationalist groups host commemorations of Latvian participation in the Waffen-SS in World War II on a yearly basis.

=== Legal framework ===
The constitution states everyone has the right to “freedom of thought, conscience, and religion,” and “the church shall be separate from the state.” It allows restrictions on the expression of religious beliefs in order to protect public safety, welfare, morals, the democratic structure of the state, and others’ rights.

The law gives eight “traditional” religious groups – Lutherans, Catholics, Latvian Orthodox Christians, Old Believers, Baptists, Methodists, Seventh-day Adventists, and Jews – some rights and privileges not given to other religious groups, including the right to teach religion courses in public schools and the right to officiate at marriages without obtaining a civil marriage license from the Ministry of Justice. These eight groups are also the only religious groups represented on the government's Ecclesiastical Council, an advisory body established by law and chaired by the prime minister that meets on an ad hoc basis to comment and provide recommendations on religious issues. These recommendations do not carry the force of law.

Although the government does not require religious groups to register, the law accords registered religious groups a number of rights and privileges, including legal status to own property and conduct financial transactions, eligibility to apply for funds for religious building restoration, and tax deductions for donors. The eight traditional groups are considered to be automatically registered; other groups must re-register every year for ten years.

The law criminalizes hate speech and the incitement of hatred on the basis of religious affiliation but requires legal proof of substantial harm for conviction. Penalties range from community service to up to 10 years of imprisonment. Committing a crime for religious reasons may also be considered an aggravating factor at trial.

The law stipulates foreign missionaries may be issued a residency permit, hold meetings, and proselytize only if a registered domestic religious group invites them to conduct such activities.

==== Education ====
The government funds religion and ethics classes in public schools. The school must receive the approval of the parents of at least 10 students in order to hold religion classes; if such approval is not obtained, students take courses on general ethics. The Center for Educational Content at the Ministry of Education must review the content of the classes to verify they do not violate freedom of conscience.

Students at state-supported national minority schools may attend classes on a voluntary basis on the religion “characteristic of the national minority.” Other nontraditional religious groups without their own state-supported minority schools may provide religious education only in private schools.

=== Government practices ===
In 2017, President Raimonds Vejonis and other senior government officials, including the prime minister's legal advisor, the president's legal advisors, representatives from the Ministry of Foreign Affairs, and members of parliament, met with Jewish groups to discuss property restitution. Despite the talks, the government did not take any additional steps to restitute property in accordance with the 2009 Terezin Declaration, which called for measures to provide for assistance, redress, and remembrance for victims of Nazi persecution.

Authorities continued to monitor the activities of the Islamic Cultural Center in Latvia, according to the annual report of the Security Police. ICCL leader Lucins again said he did not view government monitoring of his group to be discrimination or a violation of ICCL members' rights.

President Vejonis and other senior government officials, including Speaker of the Parliament Inara Murniece, Prime Minister Maris Kucinskis, and Minister of Defense Raimonds Bergmanis, attended or spoke at Holocaust memorial events, including International Holocaust Remembrance Day, Latvian Holocaust Memorial Day, and the Rumbula Forest Massacre Memorial.

=== Societal attitudes ===
Annual marches take place on March 16 to commemorate Latvians who fought in the grenadier divisions of the Waffen SS against the Soviet Red Army in World War II. The event is routinely condemned by various groups from outside of Latvia. In 2017, approximately 250 persons, including 10–15 SS veterans and three members of parliament from the All for Latvia Party, participated. Protesters also attended. The organizers, the Hawks of Daugava group, characterized the annual march as a commemoration of national identity and remembrance of those who fought for independence, rather than as a glorification of Nazism. Police arrested five persons protesting against the march.

Jewish community leaders have commented instances of antisemitism, particularly on the internet. Antisemitic comments included accusations that Jews do not belong in Latvia, that they do not deserve reparations for the Holocaust, or that they themselves participated in orchestrating the Holocaust.

Muslim community leaders also identified instances of online anti-Muslim sentiment, with the anti-Muslim focusing on the theme that Islam is incompatible with Latvian society, and that Muslim individuals represent a detriment to Latvia.

=== Freedom of religion ===
In 2023, the country was scored 4 out of 4 for religious freedom.

== Liechtenstein ==
Liechtenstein maintains upholds the freedom of worship, although members of minority religious groups have trouble establishing permanent religious buildings and there is some societal prejudice toward members of the Muslim minority in the country.

The constitution stipulates everyone is free to choose his or her faith. It makes the state responsible for "protecting the religious ... interests of the People" and establishes Roman Catholicism as the state religion with full protection from the state.

The law prescribes criminal penalties for public incitement to hatred towards a religious group, religious discrimination, or "debasement" of any religion. Municipalities provided funding to Catholic and Protestant groups and financed social integration projects organized by smaller religious groups.

There were no mosques in the country; there was one Islamic prayer room run by the Turkish Association. The Liechtenstein Institute stated Muslims faced difficulties in renting prayer facilities due to societal wariness about Islam. Religious groups in every municipality continued to open their chapels to other denominations and faiths, such as Orthodox and Islamic groups, to worship upon request.

The law prohibits the slaughter of animals without anesthetization, making the ritual slaughter of animals for kosher and halal meat illegal. Importation of such meat is legal.

The law requires religious education be included in the curriculum in public schools, both at the primary and secondary levels. Catholic or Protestant Reformed religious education is compulsory in all primary schools; exemptions are available for children whose parents request them from the Office of Education. A few schools offer Islamic studies as an elective.

According to the Liechtenstein Institute, there is a general trend of apprehension and distrust toward Muslims in Liechtenstein. The Institute has also documented incidents of racist graffiti targeted at Muslim asylum seekers.

In 2023, the country scored 4 out of 4 for religious freedom.

== Lithuania ==
Lithuania has no state religion, although it confers "traditional" status on nine religious groups that have had historical presence in the country. Laws protect the practice of religion, and the government actively engages in restitution to religious organizations which had property confiscated during the Soviet era, as well as financial compensation to the Jewish community for its suffering during The Holocaust.

Antisemitic and anti-Muslim sentiments are common in Lithuania, with NGOs reporting that Muslim refugees face significant discrimination in housing and employment. Commemorations of Lithuania's independence from the Soviet Union sometimes incorporate antisemitic messaging and the rehabilitation of Lithuanian collaborators with the Nazi regime.

=== Legal framework ===
The constitution stipulates there is no state religion and provides for the right of individuals to choose freely any religion or belief, to profess their religion and perform religious practices, individually or with others, in private or in public, and to practice and teach their beliefs. It states no one may compel another person (or be compelled) to choose or profess any religion or belief. It restricts freedom of expression if it incites religious hatred, violence, or discrimination, and stipulates that religious belief may not serve as justification for failing to comply with laws.

The law recognizes as "traditional" those religious groups able to trace back their presence in the country at least 300 years. The law lists nine "traditional" religious groups: Roman Catholic, Greek Catholic, Evangelical Lutheran, Evangelical Reformed, Russian Orthodox, Old Believer, Jewish, Sunni Muslim, and Karaite. Traditional religious groups have a simplified registration procedure and enjoy certain other privileges. Other religious associations may apply to the Ministry of Justice for state recognition if they have been officially registered in the country for at least 25 years. Parliament votes whether to grant this status upon recommendation from the Ministry of Justice. Unregistered communities have no legal status; however, the constitution allows them to conduct worship services and seek new members.

The criminal code prohibits discrimination based on religion and provides penalties of up to two years in prison for violations. The code penalizes interference with religious ceremonies of recognized religious groups with imprisonment or community service and penalizes inciting religious hatred with imprisonment of up to three years.

==== Education ====
The law permits and funds religious instruction in public schools for traditional and other state-recognized religious groups. Most religious instructors are regular state-employed teachers, but some are priests, seminarians, or monks. Parents may choose either religious instruction or secular ethics classes for their children. Schools decide which of the traditional religious groups will be represented in their curricula on the basis of requests from parents of children up to age 14, after which students present the requests themselves.

There are 30 private religious schools in the country, which receive government support through a voucher system.

=== Government practices ===
The government operates programs to return properties belonging to religious communities that were expropriated either while Lithuania was part of the Soviet Union or during the Nazi occupation of Lithuania. In addition to the restitution of property, the traditional religious communities are given funding on a yearly basis as compensation for religious property which was destroyed and cannot be returned. 90% of this funding is given to the Roman Catholic Church, with the second largest sum being given to the Russian Orthodox Church. The government has also allocated several hundreds of thousands of euros to the renovation of Jewish synagogues.

In September 2017, Member of Parliament Emanuelis Zingeris said it was time that the country remove monuments to citizens who had written antisemitic propaganda or were suspected of having collaborated with the Nazis. Members of the Jewish community stated street names and monuments honoring Kazys Skirpa and Jonas Noreika were their primary concern.

Government officials regularly participate in ceremonies led by Jewish organizations to commemorate the Holocaust.

=== Societal attitudes ===
In January 2017, during a television game show, while a group was singing a song popularized by a Jewish singer, one of the judges, actress and former parliamentarian Asta Baukute stood up, gave a Nazi salute and repeatedly shouted "Jew." Following protests, the producer and host of the show issued apologies and the station, Lithuanian National Radio and Television, cancelled the show.

NGOs, including Caritas and the Lithuanian Red Cross, reported Muslim refugees faced discrimination in their applications for housing and employment. According to a poll by the Institute for Ethnic Studies, 46 percent of respondents said they would not want Muslims as neighbors, which was the highest negative view expressed about any religious or ethnic group. Respondents also were more opposed to accepting Muslim refugees compared to non-Muslim refugees: 72 percent opposed accepting Muslims from Iraq and Syria, while 55 percent opposed non-Muslims from Iraq and 50 percent opposed Christians from Syria.

Antisemitic and anti-Muslim comments on the internet were common. Antisemitic examples included justifying the Holocaust because "all Jews collaborated with the Soviet Union" and statements that Jewish greed was destroying the country and that Jews could not be citizens. Anti-Muslim examples included equating Muslims with terrorists, statements that Muslims would kill all Christians in the country, and that it was better to have 100 dead Muslims than one dead innocent person.

Nationalist demonstrations commemorating Lithuania's independence from the Soviet Union have incorporated antisemitic messaging, as well as the commemoration of Lithuanians who collaborated with the Nazi regime, who are memorialized as anti-Soviet activists.

=== Freedom of religion ===
In 2023, the country scored 4 out of 4 for religious freedom.

== Luxembourg ==
Luxembourg's laws establish the freedom of religion, and formally recognizes six religious communities, although unrecognized religious groups are still allowed to practice. Some legislation banning facial coverings has been introduced, but as of 2017 is unenforced. According to the Prime Minister's office, the government takes a proactive stance toward providing religious amenities to refugees, who are predominantly Muslim.

=== Legal framework ===
The constitution guarantees freedom of religion, including the freedom to public religious practice and to manifest religious opinions, as long as no crime is committed in exercising that freedom. While the constitution guarantees the right to assemble peacefully without prior authorization, it stipulates that open-air religious or other meetings are subject to regulation by police.

The government has formally approved conventions with six recognized religious communities, which it supports financially based on the number of adherents of each group. The six recognized communities are: the Catholic Church; the Greek, Russian, Romanian, and Serbian Orthodox Churches as one community; the Anglican Church; the Reformed Protestant Church of Luxembourg and the Protestant Church of Luxembourg as one community; the Jewish community; and the Muslim community. To qualify for a convention with the state, a religious community must be a recognized world religion and establish an official and stable representative body with which the government can interact. Groups without signed conventions, such as the Baháʼí Faith, may operate freely but do not receive state funding.

=== Government practices ===
Legislation has been introduced at various levels of government to ban facial coverings, such as the burqa, in public spaces. As of the end of 2017, such legislation was not being enforced by police officers. According to Assembly of the Muslim Community, only sixteen women in the country of Luxembourg wear burqa or niqāb, and a representative criticized the legislation as therefore unnecessary, and criticized the Justice Minister for not consulting the Muslim community before introducing the legislation.

According to data provided by the prime minister's office, through October t017 he government had granted refugee status to 938 individuals, the majority of whom were Muslim. The Organization for Welcome and Integration (OLAI), an entity of the Ministry of Family and Integration, stated the government sought to be proactive in assuring refugee access to mosques, halal meals, and same-sex housing for those who requested it. OLAI reported no complaints or concerns by refugees related to the practice of their religion.

=== Societal attitudes ===
In September 2017, the Bar Association changed its internal regulations to ban lawyers from wearing headscarves while practicing law. The decision was made the night before the September swearing-in ceremony for new attorneys admitted to the bar, and the following morning, a female candidate was asked to remove her head covering if she wanted to be sworn in. She declined and did not participate in the ceremony.

Leaders of the six recognized religious communities agreed to meet on an ad hoc basis in the Council of Recognized Religious Communities. According to its members, the council did not convene during 2017, as there were no issues that rose to the level requiring their combined attention.

=== Freedom of religion ===
In 2023, the country was scored 4 out of 4 for religious freedom.

== Malta ==
Malta's laws establish the freedom of religion, outlaw religiously motivated hate speech, and also establish the Catholic Church as the state religion. The government, as well as Catholic Church officials, has engaged in programs to ensure that Muslim residents have access to religious education for their faith. According to a study published by the University of Malta, there are prevalent discriminatory attitudes against Muslim immigrants in the general population, and that instances of hate speech and hate crimes are underreported.

=== Legal framework ===
The constitution stipulates full freedom of conscience and religious worship, subject to restrictions in the interests of public safety, order, morality, or health, or protection of the rights and freedoms of others. It prohibits discriminatory treatment on the basis of creed. The constitution establishes Catholicism as the state religion and declares the Catholic Church has “the duty and the right to teach which principles are right and which are wrong.”

The government does not require religious groups to be registered. Registration is optional, and allows religious groups to more easily collect funds from their congregation and receive grants from the government and the European Union.

The criminal code prohibits individuals from wearing “masks or disguises” in public, unless explicitly allowed by law; there is no specific reference – or exception – to coverings worn for religious reasons. Violations are subject to a reprimand, fine, or jail sentence. This ban is generally not enforced by the government.

The law allows criticism of religious groups but prohibits incitement of religious hatred; violators are subject to imprisonment for a term of six to 18 months.

=== Education ===
The constitution and law make Catholic education compulsory in public schools, although non-Catholic teachers may teach the course. Students, with parental consent if the student is under the age of 16, may opt out of these classes and instead take an ethics course if one is available. If a school does not offer an ethics course, students may still opt out of the religion class.

Students may enroll in private religious schools. The law does not regulate religious education in private schools. The law does not allow homeschooling for religious or other reasons except for physical or mental infirmity.

In 2017, government advanced plans to introduce the voluntary study of Islamic religious education in an after-school program in a number of state primary- and secondary-level schools, although the government had yet to release a specific timeline for the program's implementation. These plans were motivated by the announced closure of the Mariam Al-Batool Secondary School, which had previously provided Islamic education, due to financial reasons. Discussions are also underway, although not as well developed, to explore similar programs for other religious groups.

=== Societal attitudes ===
Following the announcement of the closure of the Mariam Al-Batool Secondary School, Catholic Archbishop Charles Scicluna announced that Catholic schools would be willing to offer Islam as a subject. This declaration generated public controversy, including protests by the nationalist Moviment Patrijotti Maltin.

In October 2017, the University of Malta released a study conducted under the auspices of the EU-supported C.O.N.T.A.C.T (Creating an Online Network, Monitoring Team and Phone App to Counter Hate Crime Tactics), an anti-hate-speech project. The study, which analyzed online reactions to local news portals and relied on questionnaires and interviews, concluded the most prevalent discriminatory attitudes in the country were against Muslim migrants, particularly those who did not have legal resident status. According to the study, there was a widespread tendency to confound religion with ethnicity, such as categorizing persons as Muslims because of their skin color or Muslims as Africans or Arabs because of their faith. The study also stated incidents of hate speech and hate crime were significantly underreported.

=== Freedom of religion ===
In 2023, the country was scored 4 out of 4 for religious freedom.

== Moldova ==
Moldova's laws establish the freedom of religion and outlaw religious discrimination. The Moldovan Orthodox church is accorded some additional privileges over other religious organizations, and local governments sometimes pass further restrictions or refuse to enforce provisions established by higher levels of government, generally to the detriment of minority religious groups. There is a low but consistent level of societal antipathy against Jehovah's Witnesses, Muslims, and Jews, at times escalating to counts of vandalism.

The de facto autonomous region of Transnistria has a similar legal framework as Moldova on the subject of religion; human rights groups have identified patterns of discrimination against Jehovah's Witnesses, Protestants, and Muslims in Transnistria, including intimidation which has led such communities to forego seeking official status in the region.

=== Legal framework ===
The constitution of Moldova establishes the freedom of religion, and prohibits all acts of hatred between religious groups, as well as stating that religious organizations have the freedom to operate independently of the state and that it is part of the state's role to support religious institutions in the country. The law also prohibits discrimination based on religious affiliation.

The law stipulates that the state recognize the “exceptional importance and fundamental role” of Orthodox Christianity, particularly that of the Moldovan Orthodox church, in the life, history, and culture of the country.

In 2017, a law was enacted that allows individuals, but not companies or other legal entities, to redirect 2 percent of their income tax to NGOs or religious organizations. Religious groups wanting to benefit from the provisions must register with the Ministry of Justice, and use the amounts received only for social, moral, cultural, and/or charitable activities.

The law bans religious entities from engaging in political activity and prohibits “abusive proselytism,” defined as the action of changing religious beliefs through coercion.

Although the law provides for restitution of property confiscated during the successive Nazi and Soviet periods to politically repressed or exiled persons, the provision does not apply to property confiscated from religious groups. Under previous agreement between the Ministry of Culture and the Moldovan Orthodox Church, the government transferred control of most confiscated churches and monasteries to the Church. Property disputes between the Moldovan Orthodox Church and Bessarabian Orthodox Church have not been resolved. The Ministry of Culture is responsible for the remaining churches and monasteries not under the control of the Moldovan Orthodox Church. Local authorities working through the Ministry of Culture may arrange with local parishes to return or lease those churches or monasteries to religious groups. Property restitution has been an ongoing problem for the Jewish community, and there is no law to address it.

The law provides for exceptions to mandatory military service on the basis of religious objection, with an alternative of civilian service being offered.

=== Education ===
The constitution provides for freedom of religious education and stipulates the state educational system “shall be of a lay nature.” According to the law, religion classes in state educational institutions are optional. Religious classes are only available for Christians, with one course designed for Orthodox and Catholic Christians, and another for Protestants.

=== Government practices ===
The authorities grant greater freedom to the Moldovan Orthodox Church, compared to other religious groups, to import religious materials and privileges pertaining to the restitution of church property. In addition, the government grants privileges, such as invitations to officiate at state-sponsored events, national holidays, and blessing ceremonies at schools, to Moldovan Orthodox clergy that it does not grant to other religious groups.

There have been a number of incidents of local governments passing additional restrictions on the freedom of religion, or failing to enforce higher government decisions about property rights for religious institutions. These incidents have affected the Jehovah's Witnesses, Pentecostal groups, Baptists, the Muslim community, and Jewish communities in particular.

The Jewish Community of Moldova has regularly reported that state authorities fail to respond to antisemitic acts, including vandalism and hate speech. Community leaders state that police have been reluctant to take action or allowed the perpetrators to escape prosecution.

=== Societal attitudes ===
The Jehovah's Witnesses, Muslim, and Jewish communities have reported instances of vandalism and verbal intimidation on a yearly basis. In 2017, these communities reported 5, 2, and 2 incidents respectively, in addition to other forms of continuous prejudice and discrimination.

Jehovah's Witnesses have stated that in a number of villages, local Orthodox priests instigated hatred and obstructed efforts by the Jehovah's Witnesses to either build new houses of worship or change the designation of premises they purchased.

According to the Islamic League in 2017, societal attitudes toward Muslims have improved over the past few years, but also stated that local media exhibits a critical attitude and bias against Islam, portraying it in a negative light in news articles and broadcasts. The Islamic League also said media outlets described crimes as "terrorist attacks" when a Muslim was involved, while news involving a non-Muslim was reported as a "crime" or "armed attack." Following one such report, Muslim women were mocked in the streets and called "terrorists." The Islamic League has also said that Muslims face discrimination when renting housing.

Antisemitic discourse and attitudes are present in recurrent comments and news items in some media outlets.

=== Transnistria ===
In the separatist region of Transnistria, the laws of the de facto Transnistrian government establish the "special role" of the Orthodox Church, while also recognizing Christianity, Islam, Buddhism, Judaism, and other religious groups historically present in the region. Officially, all individuals have the freedom to practice their religion. Religious groups are required to register in order to own property and publish literature, and they are monitored by the Ministry of Justice to ensure that they comply with activities and goals described during their registration.

The authorities screen and may ban the import and export of religious printed materials, audio and video recordings, and other religious items. The laws of Transnistria provide for exceptions to mandatory military service on the basis of religious objection, with an alternative of civilian service being offered.

Human rights experts, including representatives from Promo-Lex, have reported that minority religious groups in Transnistria not favored by the Russian Orthodox Church, including Muslims, Jehovah's Witnesses, Baptists, and Pentecostals, are treated unequally as compared to the more “traditional” religious groups. Minority religious groups, such as the Jehovah's Witnesses, refrain from requesting registration or from engaging in any other activities due to the history of local authorities refusing to register these groups and preventing them from displaying or distributing religious literature. The Muslim community has said that the Transnistria de facto authorities suggested that it join the Russian Muslim community and stay away from the Moldovan Muslim community. According to minority religious groups, local security forces monitor their activities.

=== Freedom of religion ===
In 2023, the country was scored 3 out of 4 for religious freedom.

== Monaco ==
Monaco's laws establish the freedom of religion and public worship. Roman Catholicism is the state religion, and is invoked in state ceremonies.

=== Legal framework ===
The constitution guarantees individuals the freedom of religion and public worship and protects the freedom to express opinions on all issues, provided no crimes are committed in the exercise of those freedoms. No one may be compelled to participate in the rites or ceremonies of any religion. The constitution states Roman Catholicism is the state religion.

Any religious group wishing to construct a place of worship in a public space must register a request with the Ministry of Interior.

Associations, including religious ones, must request formal recognition from the Ministry of the Interior, which provides a response within one month. Recognized religious groups obtain certain attendant rights and privileges, such as the ability to hire employees and possess property. The government has granted formal recognition to the Protestant and Jewish communities.

Catholic religious instruction is available in schools as an option requiring parental authorization. Private schools may provide religious instruction for religions other than Catholicism, although no schools in Monaco currently do so. The Ministry of Foreign Affairs attributes this to a lack of demand for religious instruction in schools.

=== Government practices ===
Catholic rituals are generally a part of state ceremonies, including annual national day celebrations.

In 2016, Minister of State Serge Telle refused recognition of Monaco's Association of Jehovah's Witnesses. This decision was overruled by a 2017 Supreme Court decision.

=== Societal attitudes ===
There are no mosques in Monaco; the Muslim community in Monaco uses a nearby mosque in Beausoleil, France, less than one kilometer away from Monaco. Muslim residents also worshipped in private prayer rooms inside their own residences.

=== Freedom of religion ===
In 2023, the country was scored 4 out of 4 for religious freedom.

== Montenegro ==
Montenegro's laws guarantee the freedom of religion and outlaw several forms of religious discrimination, as well as establishing that there is no state religion in Montenegro. The government provides some funding to religious groups.

Montenegro has experienced less religious conflict than the other former Yugoslav states, and has historically had a high degree of religious tolerance and diversity. There is, however, an outstanding dispute between the Serbian Orthodox Church and the Montenegrin Orthodox Church, as both churches lay claim to the country's many Orthodox religious sites and dispute each other's legitimacy.

According to a 2008 study, the government of Montenegro engages in a very small amount of discrimination against its Muslim minority and breakaway Orthodox groups present in the country. However, according to a 2017 survey conducted by the Council of Europe in cooperation with the Office of the Ombudsperson of Montenegro, 45% of respondents reported having experienced religious discrimination.

In 2023, the country was scored 3 out of 4 for religious freedom.

== Netherlands ==
In the Netherlands, freedom of religion found its roots in the religious wars that took place in the 16th century and which led to the first limited form of constitutional recognition of the freedom of religion in 1579. With the last major revision of the Constitution in 1983 with respect to freedom of religion, the secularization between state and church that started in the 19th century was completed. In Article 6, all discrimination based on religion or philosophy of life is forbidden. With the insertion of the term "philosophy of life," the equal treatment of religious and non-religious philosophies of life is guaranteed in conformity with the international commitments of the Netherlands. This article briefly reviews the legal and constitutional background of the Netherlands and the constitutional provisions relevant to freedom of religion. It then lists the most important international agreements and laws affecting religious organizations.^{p. 76}

There have been some incidents of discrimination and hostility to Muslims in the Netherlands in the 21st century. The Party for Freedom, and its leader Geert Wilders, advocate for policies that critics say discriminate against Muslims including banning the Qur'an, taxing the hijab, shutting down all mosques in the Netherlands, and disallowing further immigration of Muslims to the country. After the 2017 Dutch election, the party had 20 seats in the Dutch House of Representatives, comprising 13.1% of the seats in the House. After the general election of 2021, the number of seats for the Party for Freedom declined to 17, comprising 11,3% of the seats in the House.

According to research by Ineke van der Valk, an author and researcher at the University of Amsterdam, a third of mosques in the Netherlands have experienced at least one incident of vandalism, threatening letters, attempted arson, or other aggressive actions in the past 10 years. In February 2016, five men threw two Molotov cocktails at a mosque. Some 30 people, including children, were inside the mosque at the time but no one was injured. Dutch courts called it a "terrorist act." In December of the same year, a building linked to the Association of Islamic Communities was set on fire. Police suspected it was a hate crime.

In 2023, the country was scored 4 out of 4 for religious freedom.

== North Macedonia ==
The laws of North Macedonia prohibit religious discrimination and provide for equal rights for all citizens regardless of religious belief, and people generally have the freedom to practice their religion without disruption. Religious organizations have complained about unfair treatment by the government around questions of building permits and property restitution. There have been incidences of vandalism and theft against religious buildings.

While North Macedonia did experience some violence in 2001 as part of the Yugoslav Wars, it did not reach the level of violence experienced in other countries such as Bosnia and Herzegovina, and the conflict was predominantly ethnic, rather than religious, in character. An ongoing religious dispute between the Serbian Orthodox Church and Macedonian Orthodox Church has existed since the Yugoslav era, in which the Serbian Church does not recognize the Macedonian Church's self-proclaimed autocephalous status. The government of North Macedonia has at times taken action against Serbian Orthodox priests and Macedonian Orthodox priests seeking to reconcile with the Serbian church.

In 2023, the country was scored 3 out of 4 for religious freedom.

== Norway ==
While the constitution of Norway establishes that the King of Norway must be Evangelical-Lutheran, it also establishes that all individuals have the right to exercise their religion. The government's policies generally support the free practice of religion in the country, and it provides funding to religious organizations and anti-discrimination programs on a regular basis. According to NGOs and the Norwegian police, religiously motivated hate speech is prevalent, particularly online, and primarily targeting the Muslim and Jewish communities.

The origins of the modern Kingdom of Norway can be traced to the kingdoms established by Vikings during the Middle Ages. During this period, Norwegian kings such as Olaf II of Norway converted to Christianity, and propagated it within their kingdoms to reify their authority. Accounts from this time period include graphic descriptions of gruesome torture perpetrated against pagans who refused to convert. The Catholic Church in Norway was replaced by Evangelical-Lutheranism during the Reformation in the 16th century, and non-Protestants were persecuted. From the 16th to 19th centuries, Norway (under either a Danish or Swedish crown) forced the Sámi people of northeastern Scandinavia to convert to Christianity, suppressing and eventually all but eradicating their indigenous religion. Jews were at times tolerated in Norway, but in 1814 a new constitution banned Jews from the country––this provision was reversed in 1851, and by the end of the 19th century Norway was home to a few thousand Jews. This population was devastated in the 1940s during the German occupation of Norway as part of World War II and the Holocaust. Toward the end of the 20th century and in the 21st, Norwegian government has adopted some constitutional reforms to recognize the traditions of the Sámi people, to establish a separation between church and state, and to provide financial restitution for the Jewish community, but it has also imposed religious clothing bans targeting Muslim women.

In 2023, the country was scored 4 out of 4 for religious freedom.

== Poland ==
Poland's Constitution guarantees the freedom of religion to everyone. It also allows for national and ethnic minorities to have the right to establish educational and cultural institutions, institutions designed to protect religious identity, as well as to participate in the resolution of matters connected with their cultural identity.

In July 2013, following animal rights activist campaigns and the European Council directive of September 24, 2009, the Polish government passed an animal protection law that had the effect of banning kosher and halal slaughter. This was condemned by Jewish and Muslim groups in Poland and around the world. In the parliamentary vote, 178 members voted for re-legalizing ritual slaughter, while 222 members opposed it.

Despite the fact that Muslims in Poland constitute less than 0.1% of the total population, stereotypes, verbal, violent, and physical displays of anti-Islam are widespread and, mostly, socially acceptable. Vandalism and attacks on the very few existing mosques are reported, and women (especially converts) who cover themselves are seen as "traitors" to their own culture.

In 2012 a Parliamentary Group for prevention of atheism in Poland was established by the Polish Sejm.

In 2023, the country was scored 4 out of 4 for religious freedom.

== Portugal ==
Article 13 of the Portuguese Constitution states, in part, that "No one may be privileged, favored, prejudiced, deprived of any right or exempted from any duty for reasons of ancestry, sex, race, language, territory of origin, religion, political or ideological beliefs, education, economic situation, social circumstances or sexual orientation." It was adopted in 1974.

In 2023, the country was scored 4 out of 4 for religious freedom.

== Romania ==
The laws of Romania establish the freedom of religion as well as outlawing religious discrimination, and provide a registration framework for religious organizations to receive government recognition and funding (this is not a prerequisite for being able to practice in the country). The government also has programs for compensating religious organizations for property confiscated during World War II and during the rule of the Socialist Republic of Romania. Representatives of minority groups have complained that the government favors the Romanian Orthodox Church over other religious groups, and there have been several incidences of local government and police failing to enforce anti-discrimination laws reliably.

=== History ===
During the existence of the Kingdom of Romania in the 19th and early 20th centuries, the government of Romania systematically favored the Orthodox and Romanian Greek Catholic Churches. Non-Christians were denied citizenship until the late 19th century, and even then faced obstacles and limited rights. Antisemitism was a prominent feature of Liberal political currents in the 19th century, before being abandoned by Liberal parties and adopted by left-wing peasant and later fascist groups in the early 20th century. During World War II, several hundred thousand Jews were killed by Romanian or German forces in Romania. Although Jews living in territories belonging to Romania prior to the beginning of the war largely avoided this fate, they nevertheless faced harsh antisemitic laws passed by the Antonescu government. During the Socialist era following World War II, the Romanian government exerted significant control over the Orthodox Church and closely monitored religious activity, as well as promoting atheism among the population. Dissident priests were censured, arrested, deported, and/or defrocked, but the Orthodox Church as a whole acquiesced to the government's demands and received support from it.

In 2023, the country was scored 3 out of 4 for religious freedom.

== Russia ==
The Constitution of Russia adopted on December 12, 1993, declares the state to be secular, and that no religion shall be declared an official or compulsory religion. The Constitution further provides for equality of all religious associations before the law and states in Article 14 that all religious organizations shall be separate from the state. This provision is contained in the chapter that constitutes the fundamental principles of the constitutional system of the Russia Federation and cannot be changed except by a very complicated procedure established by the Constitution.^{p. 107}

Religious freedom in Russia is affected by the Yarovaya law, passed in 2016, which primarily deals with counter-terrorism measures. The law includes provisions for restrictions on evangelism and missionary work, stating that missionary activity can only occur at churches and other religious sites. Missionary activities may only be performed by authorized members of registered religious groups and organizations. A group becomes ineligible to perform missionary activities if they have been banned under a court order for practicing extremism or terrorism, or have been liquidated. Foreign missionaries may only perform missionary activities after registering for a permit from a recognized religious organization.

The Russian government has obstructed the activities of some religious groups that it deemed to be "totalitarian" or "extremist". These labels are often used to curtail the activities of religious groups that the Russian Orthodox Church deems "not traditional", including the Jehovah's Witnesses, and some newer Protestant movements. In 2017, a report from the U.S. Commission on International Religious Freedom classified Russia as one of the world's worst violators of freedom of religion, a "country of particular concern" under the International Religious Freedom Act.

Antisemitism is present in Russian society, with a number of violent incidents occurring in the 21st century. The prominence of antisemitism in Russia has decreased since its peak in the early 2000s.

In 2023, the country was scored 1 out of 4 for religious freedom.

== San Marino ==
The laws of San Marino prohibit religious discrimination, prevent restrictions on religious freedom, and include provisions for prosecuting religious hate crimes. A code of conduct for media professionals prohibits the spreading of information that may discriminate against someone by religion.

Catholic religious instruction is offered in all public schools, but the law guarantees the right of nonparticipation without penalty. Taxpayers may designate 0.3 percent of their income tax be allocated to the Catholic Church or other religious groups registered as nonprofit organizations. Catholic symbols remained common in state buildings.

In 2023, the country was scored 4 out of 4 for religious freedom.

== Serbia ==
The government of Serbia does not keep records of religiously motivated violence, and reporting from individual religious organization is sparse.

The laws of Serbia establish the freedom of religion, forbid the establishment of a state religion, and outlaw religious discrimination. While registration with the government, is not necessary for religious groups to practice, the government confers certain privileges to registered groups. The government maintains a two-tiered system of registered groups, split between "traditional" groups and "nontraditional" groups. Minority groups and independent observers have complained that this system consists of religious discrimination.

The government has programs established for the restitution of property confiscated by the government of Yugoslavia after World War II, and for property lost in the Holocaust.

The media and individual members of parliament have been criticized for using disparaging language when referring to non-traditional groups. Antisemitic literature is commonly available in bookstores, and is prevalent online.

Although religious freedom was largely respected by the government of the Kingdom of Yugoslavia and the Socialist Federal Republic of Yugoslavia, and Serbia's constitutions through its various incarnations as either an independent state or as part of Yugoslavia have nominally upheld religious freedom, it was also the site of significant religiously and ethnically motivated war crimes during World War II and the Yugoslav Wars.

In 2023, the country was scored 4 out of 4 for religious freedom.

== Slovakia ==
The laws of Slovakia guarantee the freedom of religious belief, and criminalize the defamation of and discrimination against religious groups. Religious groups may register with the government in order to receive certain privileges, but the threshold of membership required for new groups to register is prohibitively high. Government officials have explicitly stated that preventing Islamic organizations from registering is a reason for this requirement. Christian groups have also complained that this membership threshold stymies the ability for individuals in registered religious organizations to dissent against their religious leadership.

Politicians from far-right parties in the National Council, Slovakia's legislative body, frequently espouse Islamophobic and antisemitic rhetoric and conspiracy theories. Some of them have faced censure as a consequence of their violation of laws against the propagation of extremist materials and against affiliation with groups dedicated to the suppression of fundamental rights and freedoms.

According to NGOs and unregistered religious groups, negative attitudes toward unregistered religious groups are prevalent, and there are significant amounts of hate speech online against religious minorities and refugees.

In 2023, the country was scored 4 out of 4 for religious freedom.

== Slovenia ==
Slovenia's laws guarantee the freedom of religion and establish a separation between church and state, as well as prohibiting religious discrimination and religious hatred. Religious groups may easily register with the government in order to receive some privileges, largely consisting of various forms of monetary compensation.

Slovenia's laws prohibit circumcision for nonmedical reasons and animal slaughtering practices that are necessary for meat to be considered kosher or halal. Members of the Jewish and Muslim communities observe these practices outside of the country (importing meat, and traveling to neighboring countries for religious circumcision) without obstruction from Slovenia's government.

In 2023, the country was scored 4 out of 4 for religious freedom.

== Spain ==
Spain's constitution establishes the freedom of religion. Since the end of the Franco regime, Spain gradually transitioned away from having Catholicism as a state religion, reducing the amount of cooperation between the Catholic Church and the state, as well as the financial contributions made by or through the state to the Church. Starting in the 21st century, the Catholic Church began to reassert itself in politics, but no longer as a purportedly neutral actor, instead openly aligning with the right-wing People's Party, to the detriment of its influence among left-wing constituencies.

Watchdog groups have identified a few hundred instances of religious hate crimes each year, primarily consisting of vandalism against religious buildings, although instances of religiously motivated assault against Muslims have also been reported. Anti-Muslim and antisemitic discourse is prevalent in public and on social media.

In 2023, the country was scored 4 out of 4 for religious freedom.

== Sweden ==
The constitution protects the freedom to practice one’s religion and prohibits discrimination based on religion.

The Church of Sweden lost its position as the state church on 1 January 2000. Since then, 22 recognized religious denominations, in addition to the Church of Sweden, raise revenues through member-contributions made through the national tax system. All recognized denominations are entitled to direct government financial support, contributions made through the national tax system, or a mix of both. The state does not favor the Church of Sweden at the expense of other religious groups in any noticeable way. Certain Christian religious holy days are national holidays. School students from minority religious backgrounds are entitled to take relevant religious holidays.

A government study showed that between 2015 and 2021, there were 1,293 reports of religious- or belief-based discrimination, mainly against Muslims; the Nordic Resistance Movement has also carried out several instances of hate-speech against Jews and Muslims.

In 2022, the archbishop of the Church of Sweden, issued a public apology to the country’s indigenous Sámi community for what she called centuries of mistreatment perpetrated by the church; in the same year, the church temporarily closed all its buildings after repeated vandalism.

In 2023, the country was scored 4 out of 4 for religious freedom.

== Switzerland ==
Full freedom of religion has been guaranteed since the revised Swiss Constitution of 1874 (Article 49). During the Old Swiss Confederacy, there had been no de facto freedom of religion, with persecution of Anabaptists in particular well into the 18th century. Swiss Jews had been given full political rights in 1866, although their right to settle freely was implemented as late as 1879 in the canton of Aargau.

The current Swiss Constitution of 1999 makes explicit both positive and negative religious freedom in Article 15, paragraph 3 - which asserts that every person has the right to adhere to a religious confession and to attend religious education - and paragraph 4, which asserts that nobody can be forced to either adhere to a religious confession or to attend religious education, thus explicitly asserting the right of apostasy from a previously held religious belief.

The basic right protected by the constitution is that of public confession of adherence to a religious community and the performance of religious cult activities. Article 36 of the constitution introduces a limitation of these rights if they conflict with public interest or if they encroach upon the basic rights of others. Thus, ritual slaughter is prohibited as conflicting with Swiss animal laws. Performance of cultic or missionary activities or religious processions on public ground may be limited. The Jesuit order was banned from all activity on Swiss soil from 1848 to 1973. The use of cantonal taxes to support cantonal churches has been ruled legal by the Federal Supreme Court. Some commentators have argued that the minaret ban introduced by popular vote in 2009 constitutes a breach of religious freedom.

Surveys and studies have identified social bias against Muslims and Jews in Switzerland. While most instances of religiously motivated harassment have been verbal, since 2016 there have been a few reports of physical assault against Jews, and Muslim cemeteries have been targeted for vandalism.

In 2023, the country was scored 3 out of 4 for religious freedom.

== Ukraine ==
Ukraine's laws guarantee the right of religious freedom, and provide a legal framework for the registration of religious groups. Some religious groups have reported difficulties in legally acquiring property (including property previously confiscated by the government of the Soviet Union) due to discriminatory treatment by local government bodies.

Prior to the Russian Revolution, antisemitic laws were enforced in parts of Ukraine controlled by the Russian Empire, and anti-Jewish mob violence was a regular occurrence. Successive revolutionary governments repealed antisemitic legislature, but also conducted anti-religious campaigns, particularly in the 1920s and 1930s. By the 1940s, religious policy in Ukraine shifted, focusing on repressing religious tendencies associated with Ukrainian nationalism while favoring the Russian Orthodox Church, although the state still promoted atheism. During World War II, Jews were massacred by Nazi and Ukrainian nationalist factions, while the Soviet government deported Muslim Crimean Tatars, primarily to Uzbekistan. Religious persecution in the Soviet Union was halted in the 1980s, leading to a religious revival in Ukraine.

The liberalization of religious policies and subsequent collapse of the Soviet Union has also led to an increase of friction between Christian denominations in Ukraine, as dormant grievances (as well as grievances stemming from Soviet favoritism for the Russian Orthodox Church) have become relevant once more. As of 2019, ongoing disputes of jurisdiction between the Ukrainian Orthodox Church – Kyiv Patriarchate and the Ukrainian Orthodox Church Moscow Patriarchate have transformed into disputes between the UOC-MP and the newly canonized Orthodox Church of Ukraine. Communities have been given the opportunity to remain in the UOC-MP or re-affiliate with the OCU, and both the UOC-MP and OCU have accused each other of misconduct in the process of re-affiliation. Far-right Ukrainian nationalist groups such as Freedom have assaulted members of the Moscow Patriarchate and otherwise harassed them. In several instances, clergymen of Moscow Patriarchate have tried to physically block attempts of their parishes to re-affiliate with the OCU.

There have been several instances of violence against Jews in Ukraine since 2013, although as of 2019 watchdog groups have stated that conditions are improving.

Vandalism against religious buildings and monuments is common, with many different denominations affected. Jewish and Roman Catholic buildings were among the most targeted.

Due to the ongoing Russian military intervention in Ukraine, some regions which are de jure and internationally recognized as parts of Ukraine are administered either by Russia (in the case of Crimea) or by separatist groups (in the cases of Luhansk Oblast and Donetsk Oblast). In territories not controlled by the government of Ukraine, Jehovah's Witnesses have faced persecution by Russian and separatist authorities. Russian media has also frequently denounced Jehovah's Witnesses, the Kyiv Patriarchate and the Orthodox Church of Ukraine as being "pro-fascist".

In 2023, the country was scored 3 out of 4 for religious freedom; in 2022, several dozen clergy members of the Ukrainian branch of the Russian Orthodox Church were arrested after allegations were made that they had aided the Russian military.

== United Kingdom ==
The Human Rights Act 1998, which incorporates the European Convention on Human Rights into domestic law, guarantees the protection of individual rights, including freedom of thought, conscience, and religion, and the freedom to hold or adopt a religion or belief of one's choice. Religious organizations are generally accorded the status of tax exempt public charities. Religious education is mandated in state schools based on a syllabus reflecting the country's Christian traditions, but taking into account the other principal represented religions. Students may be excused from attendance at religious worship or instruction upon the request of a parent.^{p. 159}

=== Government authority over the Church of England and the Church of Scotland ===
Parliament has authority to govern the Church of England, but since 1919 has generally delegated this authority to that Church's General Synod (earlier called the Church Assembly). Parliament retains the power to veto measures of the General Synod or Church Assembly; this rarely invoked power was used in 1927 and 1928 to prevent adoption of a revised prayer book. Measures also require royal assent.

The appointment of bishops and archbishops of the Church falls within the royal prerogative. In current practice, the Prime Minister makes the choice from two candidates submitted by a commission of prominent Church members, then passes his choice on to the monarch. The Prime Minister plays this role even though he himself is not required to be a member of the Church of England or even a Christian—for example Clement Attlee was an agnostic who described himself as "incapable of religious feeling". Senior Church of England bishops have a right to sit in the House of Lords, the upper chamber of the Parliament of the United Kingdom.

The Church of Scotland is Presbyterian while the Church of England is Anglican (Episcopalian). The former is a national church guaranteed by law to be separate from the state, while the latter is a state-established church, and any major changes to doctrine, liturgy, or structure must have parliamentary approval. Neither Wales nor Northern Ireland currently have established churches: the Church in Wales was disestablished in 1920, the Church of Ireland in 1871. The Act of Settlement 1701 mandates that no Catholic shall be the monarch of the United Kingdom, nor shall they be married to one. The king or queen must promise to uphold the rights of the Presbyterian church in Scotland and the Anglican church in England. The monarch is the supreme governor of the Church of England, holding the title of Defender of the Faith, but an ordinary member of the Church of Scotland. Neither church receives direct funding from taxation.

=== Attitudes toward religious minorities ===
According to a government investigation conducted in 2013, 75% of Sikhs in the UK have experienced discrimination. The Troubles in Northern Ireland included sectarian killings between Catholics and Protestants, but since the Good Friday Agreement in 1998 and the St Andrews Agreement in 2006, killings have largely ceased, although sectarian murders are occasionally still reported and tensions linger. Studies conducted in 2017 by the Runnymede Trust and the University of Greenwich found that Muslim prisoners face worse conditions in British jails, alongside Black prisoners. Muslims in the UK are further subject to hate crimes and violence. While the Campaign Against Antisemitism has criticized British police for not responding sufficiently to antisemitic crime in 2016, the Pew Research Center and Institute for Jewish Policy Research published reports in 2015 and 2017 finding that the UK has one of the lowest rates of antisemitism in the world.

=== Freedom of religion ===
In 2023, the country was scored 4 out of 4 for religious freedom.
