= Archive law in Switzerland =

Overview of archival law in Switzerland

Archivistic law in Switzerland is regulated in a federalist manner: each canton has its own law and/or regulation (ordinance) on archives. There are also archival regulations in some cities and large municipalities. The Confederation enacted the Archiving Act in 1998, though it only affects federal archives and has no direct effect on the cantons, cities, or municipalities, although cantons that legislated after 1998 drew inspiration from federal provisions.

Due to federalism, regulations are highly diverse, particularly regarding protection periods. However, they often share a similar structure. Each archive stems from its own historical and regulatory tradition. For example, the state archives of a university canton do not operate in the same environment as those of a non-university canton.

== History of archival law ==
Until the 1980s, archival regulation was mostly limited to a few regulatory provisions included in texts governing the executive functions responsible for archives, except in the Canton of Geneva, which, as early as 1925, adopted a "Loi sur les archives publiques". In 1984 and 1989, the cantons of Jura and Neuchâtel also adopted archival laws. Their motivations were quite different: for Jura, it was about equipping the newly created canton with an archival organization, while for Neuchâtel, it was about addressing the challenge of new digital media and clarifying problematic protection periods.

A new legislative development took place in the 1990s with the emergence of data protection laws. Their priority was the protection of personal privacy (data protection). In order of adoption, the following cantons now have a law on archives: Jura (1984 and 2011), Neuchâtel (1989), Zurich (1995), Basel-Stadt (1996), Geneva (2000), Glarus and Lucerne (2003), Zug (2004), Basel-Landschaft, Solothurn (2006), Bern (2009), Ticino (2011), and Vaud (2012). Strictly speaking, these are mostly laws on archiving rather than on archives, as they regulate the archiving process.

In other cantons, archiving is governed only by regulations, some of which are 30 years old. These regulations often address archives alongside other provisions related to state organization.

In Aargau, the "Gesetz über die Information der Öffentlichkeit, den Datenschutz und das Archivwesen" (IDAG) was adopted in 2006. This was the first time in Switzerland that these three themes were combined in a single regulatory text. The Valais followed suit with a similar joint law adopted in 2008 (Loi sur l'information du public, la protection des données et l'archivage, LIPDA). In Geneva, these three areas were coordinated through a series of legislative revisions: the "Loi sur les archives" (LArch in 2000 and its regulation in 2001), and the "Loi sur l'information du public, l'accès aux documents et la protection des données personnelles" (LIPAD in 2001-2008).

In addition to strictly archival laws and regulations, there are other specific legal norms that impact archive management. For example, the Confederation, the canton of Basel-Stadt, and Vaud have regulations on the protection of personal documents. Access to archived documents may also be restricted by professional secrecy, the violation of which is punishable by fines or imprisonment under Article 321 of the penal code.

== Access rights and administrative documents ==
Some cantons have addressed the issue of access rights to archived documents in legal provisions other than archival texts. For example, the canton of Valais did so in its law and regulation on cultural promotion (LPrC, art. 29). In the cantons of Bern, Solothurn, and Vaud, access rights are not regulated in archival laws but in laws and regulations on access to public documents. In these three cantons, the public is considered to have the right to access public documents unless a prevailing interest opposes it, regardless of whether the documents are held in services or archives. Consequently, the archiving laws and regulations of these cantons contain only marginal notes (Vaud) or no provisions (Bern, Solothurn) on access to archived documents. The Confederation, as well as the cantons of Appenzell Ausserrhoden and Geneva, recognize the principle of access to public documents. However, access to archived documents is primarily regulated in archival laws and regulations.

== Archival laws and regulations at federal and cantonal levels ==
Confederation

- Archiving Act (ArchA) of 26 June 1998 (LAr) (RS 152.1)
- Ordinanceto the Federal Act on Archiving (Archiving Ordinance) (RS 152.11)
- Ordonnance of the Federal Supreme Court of 27 September 1999 implementing the Archiving Act (RS 152.21)
- Ordonnance of 26 October 1999 of the Federal Insurance Court implementing the Archiving Act(RS 152.22)
- Data Protection Act (FADP) of 19 June 1992
- Data Protection Ordinance (DPO) of 26 October 2011

Canton of Aargau

- Ordinance on Archiving (Archives Ordinance) of 6 May 1998 (SAR 150.711)
- Ordinance on Public Information, Data Protection and Archiving (VIDAG) of 26 September 2007 (SAR 150.711)

Canton of Appenzell Ausserrhoden

- Ordinance on Archives (Archives Ordinance) of 14 November 1988 (bGS 421.11)
- Law on Information and Access to Records (Information Law) of 28 April 1996 (bGS 133.1)
- Law on Data Protection (Data Protection Law) (bGS 146.1)

Canton of Appenzell Innerrhoden

- Decision of the Cantonal Commission on the National Archives of 27 October 1992 (BGS 432.101)
- Data Protection Act (DSchG) of 30 April 2000 (BSG 172.800)

Canton of Basel-Landschaft

- Law on Archiving (Archiving Law) of 11 May 2006 (SGS 163)
- Ordinance on the Data Protection Act of 7 March 1991 (SGS 162)
- Ordinance on the Personnel Act (Personnel Ordinance) of 19 December 2000 (SGS 150.11)
- Ordinance on Records Management of 17 December 2002 (SGS 140.13)

Canton of Basel-Stadt

- Law on Archives (Archives Act) of 11 September 1996 (SG 153.600)
- Ordinance on Registries and Archiving (Registry and Archiving Ordinance) of 13 October 1998 (SG 153.610)
- Law on the Protection of Personal Data (Data Protection Act) of 18 March 1992 (SG 153.260)

Canton of Bern

- Act of 31 March 2009 on Archiving (ArchG; BSG 108.1)
- Ordinance of 4 November 2009 on Archiving (ArchV; BSG 108.111)
- Act on Public Information of 2 November 1993 (Information Act, IG; BSG 107.1)
- Ordinance on Public Information of 26 October 1994 (Information Ordinance, IV; BSG 107.111)
- Data Protection Act of 19 February 1986 (KDSG; BSG 152.04)
- Data Protection Ordinance of 22 October 2008 (DSV; BSG 152.040.1)

Canton of Fribourg

- Law of 10 September 2015 on Archiving and State Archives (LArch) (ROF 2015_088) and Règlement of ... [awaiting validation, 2017] on archiving

Canton of Geneva

- Law on Public Information, Access to Documents and the Protection of Personal Data (LIPAD) of 5 October 2001, amended on 9 October 2008 (addition of personal data protection) (RSG A 2 08)
- Law on Public Archives of 1 December 2000 (RSG B 2 15)
- Implementing regulations of the Law on Public Archives of 21 August 2001 (RSG B 2 15.01)

Canton of Glarus

- Law on Archives of 4 May 2003 (GS II A/7/1)
- Ordinance on the Archives Law of 25 October 2005 (GS II A/7/2)
- Regulations on the Organization of the State Archives and the Transfer of Records of 4 April 1972 (GS IV F/3)
- Law on the Protection of Personal Data of 5 May 2002 (GS I F/1)

Canton of Graubünden

- Ordinance for the State Archives Graubünden of 5 September 1988 (BR 490.100)
- Ordinance on Municipal, District and County Archives of 5 September 1988 (BR 490.150)
- Cantonal Data Protection Act (KDSG) of 10 June 2001 (BR 171.100)

Canton of Jura

- Law on Archiving of 20 October 2010 (RSJU 441.21)
- Ordinance on Public Archives of the Republic and Canton of Jura of 7 April 1988 (RSJU 441.211)
- Decree concerning the accession of the Republic and Canton of Jura to the intercantonal convention on data protection and transparency in the cantons of Jura and Neuchâtel CPDT-JUNE (RSJU 170.41)
- Law on Public Archives of the Republic and Canton of Jura of 11 October 1984 (repealed)

Canton of Lucerne

- Law on Archives (Archives Act) of 16 June 2003 (SRL 585)
- Ordinance on the Archives Act (Archives Ordinance) of 9 December 2003 (SRL 586)

Canton of Neuchâtel

- Law on Archiving (LArch) of 22 February 2011 and Implementing Regulations of the Law on Archiving of 29 April 2013
- Intercantonal Convention on Data Protection and Transparency in the Cantons of Jura and Neuchâtel (CPDT-JUNE) of 9 May 2012
- Law on State Archives of 9 October 1989 (RSN 442.20) (repealed)
- Implementing Decree of the Law on State Archives of 2 May 1990 (RSN 442.21) (repealed)
- Decree permanently transferring the duplicate of the Public Prosecutor's Office file to the Archives Service of State Law of 19 February 1992 (RSN 442.22)
- Cantonal Law on the Protection of Personality (LCPP), of 14 December 1982 (RSN 150.30) (repealed)
- Implementing Regulations of the Cantonal Law on the Protection of Personality of 20 June 1988 (RSN 150.31) (repealed)

Canton of Nidwalden

- Ordinance on the State Archives of 18 October 1996 (GDB 131.21)
- Law on Data Protection (Cantonal Data Protection Act, kDSG) of 1 June 2008 (GDB 232.1)

Canton of Obwalden

- Ordinance on the State Archives of 18 October 1996 (GDB 131.21)
- Data Protection Act of 1 November 2008 (GDB 137.1)

Canton of St. Gallen

- Records Management and Archiving Act of 19 April 2011 (sGS 147.1)
- Ordinance on Records Management and Archiving of 19 March 2019 (sGS 147.11)

Canton of Schaffhausen

- Ordinance on the State Archives and the Archiving of Administrative Records (Archives Ordinance) of 8 February 1994 (SHR 172.301)

Canton of Schwyz

- Ordinance on the Archives of the Canton of Schwyz of 1 July 1994 (SRSZ 140.611)
- Law on Public Access to Administrative Documents and Data Protection of 23 May 2007 (SRSZ 140.410)

Canton of Solothurn

- Information and Data Protection Act of 21 February 2001 (BGS 114.1)
- Information and Data Protection Ordinance of 10 December 2001 (BGS 114.2)
- Archives Act of 25 January 2006 (BGS 122.51)
- Archives Ordinance (ArchivVO) of 23 October 2006 (BGS 122.511)

Canton of Thurgau

- Regulations of the Government Council on the State Archives of 6 December 1988 (RB 432.111)
- Ordinance of the Cantonal Government on Municipal Archives of 9 February 1948 (RB 432.161)

Canton of Ticino

- Law on Archiving and Public Archives (LArch) of 15 March 2011 (164.100)
- Regulation of the Law on Archiving and Public Archives (RLArch) of 28 March 2012 (164.110)

Canton of Uri

- Archiving regulations of 4 June 2002 (RB 10.6212)

Canton of Valais

- Law on the Promotion of Culture (KFG) of 15 November 1996 (RDV 440.1)
- Regulation on the Promotion of Culture of 7 July 1999 (RDV 440.100)
- Regulation concerning the archives of the State administration of 17 November 1982 (RDV 440.102)
- Decree concerning the reorganization of municipal and civic archives of June 18, 1922 (RDV 440.103) (repealed?)
- Regulations on the archiving of judicial files of September 5, 2005 (RDV 173.102)
- Law concerning the protection of personal data of 18 June 1984 (RSV 235.1) (repealed?)
- Implementing regulations for the Law concerning the protection of personal data of 18 June 1984 (RSV 235.101) (repealed?)
- Law on Public Information, Data Protection and Archiving (LIPDA) of 9 October 2008 and Implementing Regulations of the Law on Public Information, Data Protection and Archiving (RèLIPDA) of 6 December 2010

Canton of Vaud

- Law on Information of 24 September 2002 (LInfo) (BLV 170.21)
- Implementing Regulations of the Law of 24 September on Information (RLInfo) (BLV 170.21.1)
- Regulations of the Judicial Order on Information (ROJI) of 13 June 2006 (BLV 170.21.2)
- Law on the Protection of Personal Data of 11 September 2007 (LPrD) (BLV 172.65)
- Regulations Implementation of the Law of 11 September 2007 on the Protection of Personal Data, of 29 October 2008 (RLPrD) (BLV 172.65.1)
- Law on Archiving of 14 June 2011 (LArch) (BLV 432.11)
- Implementing regulations for the Law of 14 June 2011 on archiving, of 19 December 2011 (BLV 432.11.1)
- Decree Ordering the transfer to the Cantonal Archives of the old cadastral maps and land registers, of 13 August 2001 (BLV 432.11.1.2)
- Decree ordering the transfer to the Cantonal Archives of the old registers and other government documents prior to 1803, in effect from 22 January 1946 (BLV 432.11.1.1)

Canton of Zug

- Archives Act of 29 January 2004 (BGS 152.4)
- Data Protection Act of 28 September 2000 (BGS 157.1)
- Data Security Ordinance (DSV) of 16 January 2007 (BGS 157.12)

Canton of Zurich

- Archives Act of 24 September 1995 (LS 432.11)
- Archive regulations of 9 December 1998 (LS 432.111)

== Bibliography ==
- Coutaz, Gilbert; Jeanmonod, Gilles (2018). "La place de la donnée personnelle dans les archives historiques. Essai d'interprétation à travers les archives de santé aux Archives cantonales vaudoises" [The Place of Personal Data in Historical Archives. An Interpretative Essay through Health Archives at the Vaud Cantonal Archives] (PDF). Rapport d'activité des Archives cantonales vaudoises 2017 (in French): 42–80.
- Coutaz, Gilbert (2016). Archives en Suisse. Conserver la mémoire à l'ère numérique [Archives in Switzerland. Preserving Memory in the Digital Age]. Le Savoir suisse, Opinion (in French). Lausanne: Presse polytechniques et universitaires romandes. p. 131.
- "Archivistique. Législation. Accès aux archives" [Archival Science. Legislation. Access to Archives]. Traverse (in French) (10, 2): 7–105. 2003.
- Burgy, François; Roth-Lochner, Barbara (2002–2003). "Les Archives en Suisse ou la fureur du particularisme" [Archives in Switzerland or the Fury of Particularism] (PDF). Archives (in French). 34 (1–2): 42–43.
- Coutaz, Gilbert (1998). "L'archiviste entre le droit à l'information et la protection des informations réservées" [The Archivist Between the Right to Information and the Protection of Restricted Information]. Lligall. Revista Catalana d'Arxivistica. Associacio d'Arxivers de Catalunya (in French) (12/1998 - Janus, 1998.1 - Ve Conférence Européennes des Archives: les bases du métier): 205–218.
- Zwicker, Josef (1997). "Archivrecht in der Schweiz – Stand und Aufgaben" [Archival Law in Switzerland – Status and Objectives]. Revue suisse d'histoire (in German). 47: 286–312.
- Coutaz, Gilbert; Giilliéron, Christian (2012). Loi sur l'archivage. Contexte, règlement d'application et lois connexes [lois sur l'information et sur la protection des données personnelles] [Law on Archiving. Context, Implementing Regulation, and Related Laws [Laws on Information and Personal Data Protection]] (in French). Chavannes-près-Renens: Archives cantonales vaudoises. p. 65.
