= Margrith Bigler-Eggenberger =

Swiss jurist (1933–2022)

Judge of the Federal Supreme Court of Switzerland
- In office 1974–1994

Personal details
- Born: 14 March 1933 Uzwil, Switzerland
- Died: 5 September 2022 (aged 89)
- Education: Law
- Alma mater: University of Zurich

Margrith Bigler-Eggenberger (14 March 1933 – 5 September 2022) was a Swiss jurist, university lecturer, judge and a member of the Social Democratic Party (SP). She was elected the first female judge of the Federal Supreme Court of Switzerland.

== Early life and education ==
Bigler-Eggenberger was born on 14 March 1933 in Uzwil, Canton St.Gallen, and grew up in a household where the perception that women and man have equal rights in a democracy was predominant. Her father Mathias Eggenberger was a member of both the Swiss National Council and the Council of States, and her mother Wilhelmina was involved in the establishment of a women's branch of the Social Democrats in Uzwil. During World War II, Jewish fugitives and socialists lived in their household. After her graduation with a Matura in 1953, she studied law at the Universities of Zurich and Geneva. Her dissertation of 1959 was inspired by her experiences while working in the detention facilities St. Jakob and Saxerriet and she obtained her license as a lawyer in St. Gallen in 1961. During vacations from her studies, she worked for a telephone manufacturer. In 1966 she became a lecturer at the University of St.Gallen and also a judge at the Social Security Court.

== Professional career ==
She established herself as an expert in women's issues in several women's organizations. She was a member of the board of the National Accident Insurance Fund (SUVA) and for the Women's Centre she established and from 1968 onwards, as a member of the board of the Alliance of Women Organizations (Alliance F), she was involved in the commission for the National Pension System of Switzerland (AHV). In later years she received the honorary doctorate from the University of Fribourg and also University of St.Gallen.

== Federal Supreme Court of Switzerland ==
Her candidacy to the Federal Supreme Court one year after women gained their right to vote did not come through well in the Swiss Parliament as several documents were withheld and she was presented as a trainee and housewife. Her candidacy did not please all and some attempted to prevent her election into a formerly men-only court. She was elected narrowly and in 1972 she became the first substitute judge and in 1974 a regular judge of the Federal Supreme Court in Lausanne. In 1977, she was involved in the equal pay lawsuit. She was a civil-law judge for 20 years until she resigned in 1994. Following that she stayed a part-time Federal judge for another two years.

== Political views ==
She was a member of the Social Democratic Party (SP) on whose ticket she was also elected into the Federal Supreme Court. She was involved in politics since an early age, at a time when women were only allowed to work with the permission of their husband and also not allowed to vote. She was a firm supporter of women's voting rights and did not understand why the Swiss People's Party (SVP) would oppose women's voter rights since in her view women played an active and independent role in a farmer's household. She was involved in the yes campaign on the referendums on women voters rights both 1959 and 1971.

== Personal life ==
Eggenberger married Kurt Bigler in 1959. Bigler was a of German-Jewish descent and born as Kurt Bergheimer. He escaped from a concentration camp in France into Switzerland in 1942. He was then adopted by the teacher Berta Bigler. The marriage between Kurt Bigler and Margrith Eggenberger was childless. She died on 5 September 2022.
