= Yves Rüedi =

Swiss jurist and lawyer (born 1976)

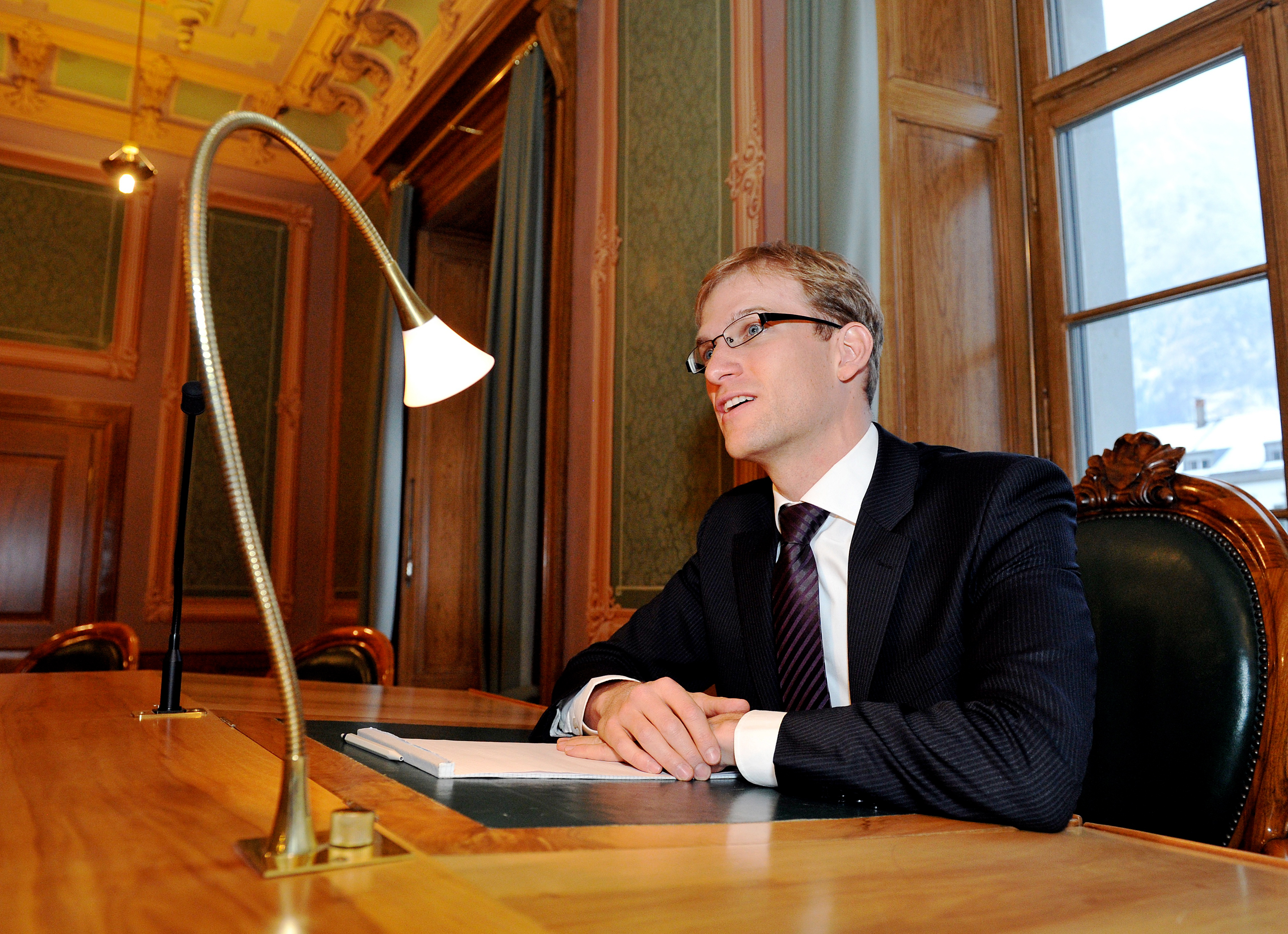

Judge of the Federal Supreme Court of Switzerland
- Incumbent
- Assumed office 1 March 2014
- Appointed by: Federal Assembly

Personal details
- Born: 30 September 1976 (age 49) Uznach, Switzerland
- Citizenship: Glarus
- Education: University of St. Gallen (M.L.); University of St. Gallen (Dr. iur.)
- Alma mater: University of St. Gallen

Yves Rüedi (German pronunciation: [ˈiv ˈryə̯di]; born 30 September 1976) is a Judge of the Federal Supreme Court of Switzerland.

== Professional career ==
=== Education ===
Rüedi earned a Master of Laws degree in 2002 and a Doctor of Law degree in 2009 from the University of St. Gallen. He also undertook research studies at Harvard Law School, Yale Law School, Stanford Law School, and Aix-Marseille University.

=== National career ===
From 2002 until 2012, Rüedi worked in private legal practice with Pestalozzi Attorneys at Law in Zürich. In 2006 he was elected President of the High Court of the Canton of Glarus by the Landsgemeinde. In 2013 the Federal Assembly appointed him as a judge to the Federal Supreme Court of Switzerland. Rüedi was the youngest judge elected to the Federal Supreme Court in history. The Judicial Committee of the Federal Assembly accredited him with an impressive academic career.

=== International career ===
From 2018 to 2020, Yves Rüedi was a member of the International Council of Arbitration for Sport (ICAS), which is the governing body of the Court of Arbitration for Sport. In 2020, Yves Rüedi was appointed to the Enlarged Board of Appeal of the European Patent Office.

== Private life ==
Rüedi is passionate about sports in general and regularly works out. In 2001 he qualified for the Ironman World Championship in Hawaii. He repeated this exploit in 2017. His performance positioned him in the top 1% of his age group earning him 2018 Ironman Gold All World Athlete status.

Legal offices
Preceded by	Judge of the Federal Supreme Court of Switzerland; 2014–present	Incumbent
