= Swiss Federal Archives =

National archives of Switzerland in Bern

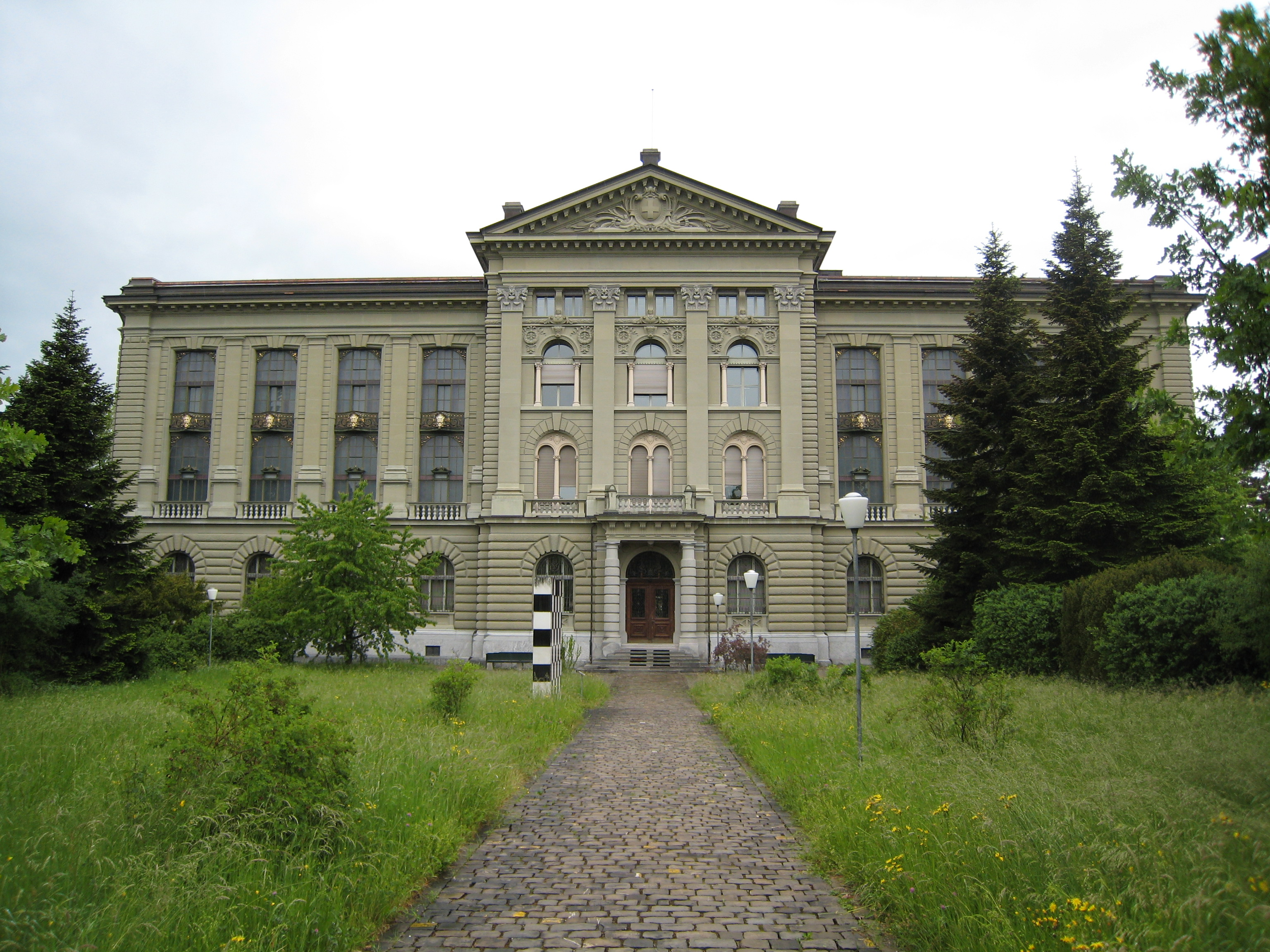
- Interactive map of Swiss Federal Archives
- 46°56′26″N 7°26′47″E
- Location: Bern, Switzerland
- Director: Philippe Künzler
- Website: Official website

The Swiss Federal Archives (German: Schweizerisches Bundesarchiv, French: Archives fédérales suisses, Italian: Archivio federale svizzero, Romansh: Archiv federal svizzer) are the national archives of Switzerland. Additionally, the cantons have official archives of their own. The building and its collections are a Swiss heritage site of national significance.

In 2018 the archives held over 66,000 linear meters of printed documents and 20.7 terabytes of digital documents. The archives have a permanent staff of 57.8 full-time equivalent and a budget of 19.2 million CHF. The archives are governed by the Federal Act on Archiving.

The Federal Archives were created in 1798 following the creation of the Helvetic Republic. Under the republic, the archives moved whenever the seat of government moved. With the creation of the Federal State in 1848 the archives became part of the Federal Chancellery and found a home in Bern in the town hall. The first federal archivist was Johann Jakob Meyer, who was appointed in 1849. In the second half of the 19th century, the archives moved to the western wing of the Parliament building. In 1868 the second chief archivist, Jakob Kaiser, was appointed. Over the following years he persuaded Parliament to purchase land across the Aare river in the Kirchenfeld district and build the current archive building. The building was built in 1896–99 by Theodor Gohl in the Renaissance Revival style.

In 1914 the archives are officially designated as the Bundesarchiv or Federal Archives. In the same year its first typewriter was installed. On 9 May 1944 the Federal Council approved the first regulations making all records in the archive which are at least 50 years old available to the public without restriction. In 1963 the first microfilm reader was installed, followed by a copier in 1965. On 15 July 1966, new regulations regarding the archives retained the 50 year limit, but made exceptions for academic research. In 1973 the 50 year limit was shortened to 35 years and in 1998 it was again reduced to 30 years.

== See also ==
- List of national archives
- Staatsarchiv Zürich
- Swiss Film Archive
- Archiving Act (Switzerland)

== Full-time positions since 2001 ==
Raw data

"Federal Finance Administration FFA: State financial statements".
"Federal Finance Administration FFA: Data portal".
