= Archiving Act (Switzerland) =

Swiss law

Archiving Act (ArchA)
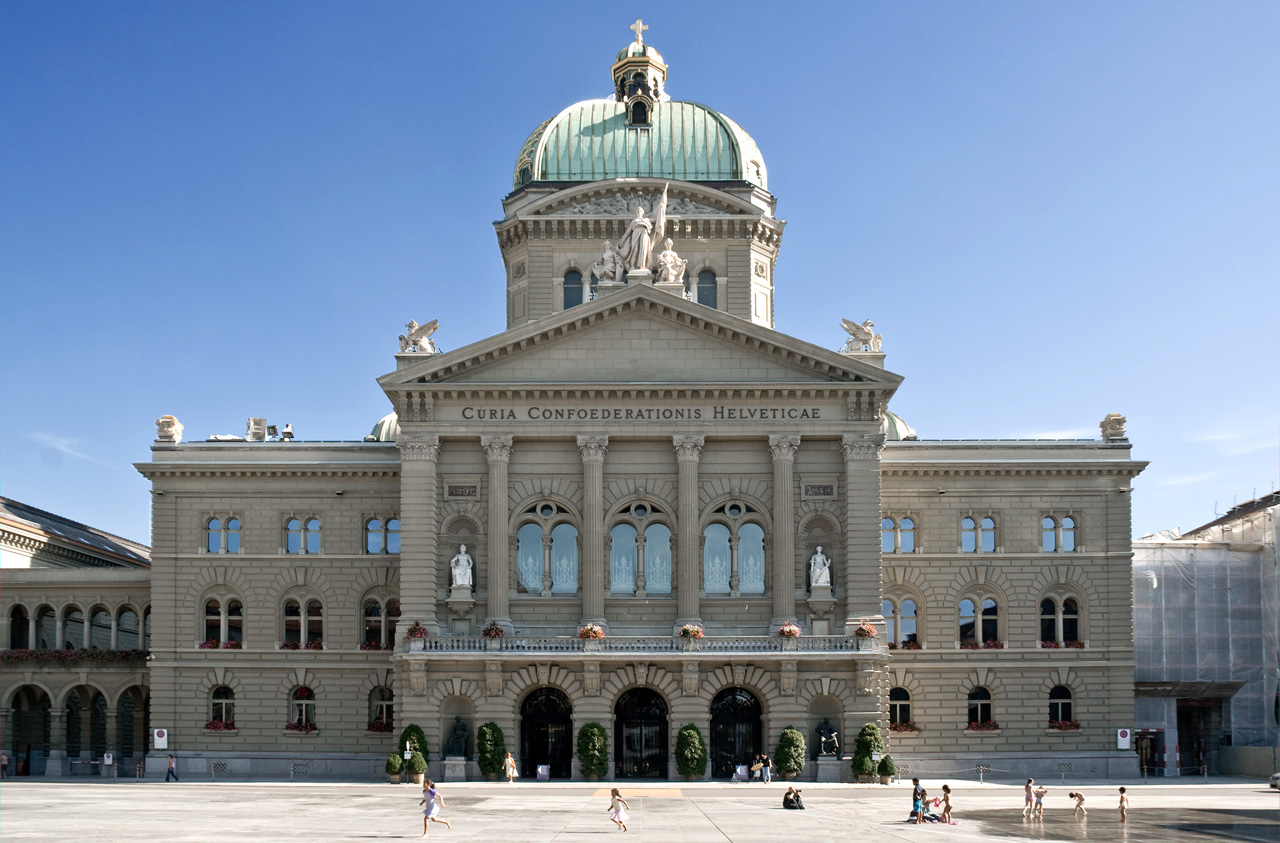

Federal Assembly of Switzerland
- Long title: Federal Act on Archiving (SR 152.1)
- Territorial extent: Switzerland
- Enacted by: Federal Assembly of Switzerland
- Enacted: 26 June 1998
- Commenced: 1 October 1999
- Status: Current legislation

The Archiving Act (ArchA) (Note: German: Archivierungsgesetz, BGA; French: Loi fédérale sur l’archivage, LAr; Italian: Legge sull’archiviazione, LAr) is a Swiss federal law that governs the management, preservation, and accessibility of public Swiss federal archives. It was adopted on 26 June 1998 by the Federal Assembly and came into force on 1 October 1999.

ArchA aims to ensure the preservation of Switzerland's documentary heritage for future generations, promote transparency and accountability in government, and facilitate research and public access to archival materials. It applies to all federal administrative units and agencies, as well as to any private entities that are entrusted with the management of public archives. At the cantonal level, this subject is covered through separate cantonal laws.

ArchA is enforced by the Swiss Federal Archives, which is responsible for overseeing the management of public archives at the federal level. The Federal Archives provide guidance and support to federal administrative units and agencies on matters related to archiving, including the development of policies and procedures for the management and preservation of archival material.

== Access to records ==
All documents are generally declassified and stored in the Federal Archive 30 years after their date of issue (art. 9). But this period can be extended to 50 years if the documents contain personal data (art. 11). In exceptional situations, such as for state secrets, can also issue an ordinance to extend this period (art. 12).

== See also ==
- Swiss Federal Archives
- Archivistic law in Switzerland
