= Alexander Sdvizhkov =

Belarusian journalist

Alexander Sdvizhkov is a Belarusian journalist. He was the deputy chief editor for Zgoda, a weekly periodical.

In the February 18-26, 2006, issue of Zgoda, an article entitled “Political Creativity” was published, illustrated with cartoons, including the image of the Prophet Muhammad. These cartoons were reprinted from the Danish newspaper Jyllands-Posten. After publication, the Belarusian KGB initiated a criminal case under the article on "inciting racial, national, or religious hatred or hostility". Sdvizhkov was sentenced to three years in a high-security prison on January 18, 2008.

The sentence garnered attention domestically and internationally. International human rights organizations classified Sdvizhkov as a "prisoner of conscience", citing his alleged persecution for exercising freedom of speech. Additionally, the European Union and the United States voiced concerns regarding the case. In its resolution of February 21, 2008, the European Parliament called for a review of the verdict.

On February 22, 2008, the Supreme Court of Belarus reduced the sentence to three months, citing the health condition of Sdvizhkov and his mother. Sdvizhkov had already served this term during the investigation and trial. On the same day, he was released.
