= Federal Insurance Court =

The Federal Insurance Court of Switzerland (FIC; German: Eidgenössisches Versicherungsgericht, French: Tribunal fédéral des assurances, Italian: Tribunale federale delle assicurazioni; Romansh: Tribunal federal d'assicuranzas) was an independent division of the Swiss Federal Supreme Court based in Lucerne. Responsible for judicial review of administrative decisions related to social security, it was composed of eleven full-time and eleven part-time judges.

Effective January 1, 2007, the FIC was completely merged with the Federal Supreme Court as the revised Federal Court Law entered into force.

== Judges ==
As of December 2006, the full-time judges of the FIC were:

- Aldo Borella
- Pierre Ferrari, vice president
- Jean-Maurice Frésard
- Yves Kernen
- Susanne Leuzinger-Naef, president
- Alois Lustenberger
- Ulrich Meyer
- Hansjörg Seiler
- Franz Schön
- Rudolf Ursprung
- Ursula Widmer-Schmid

The judges, now members of the regular Supreme Court, were elected by the Federal Assembly of Switzerland and served for six years; reelections were possible.
