= Interreligious Council of Bosnia and Herzegovina =

Bosnian-Herzegovinian religious NGO

- Type: Non-governmental organization (NGO)
- Headquarters: Ferhadija 16/1, 71000 Sarajevo, Bosnia and Herzegovina
- Website: www.mrv.ba

The Interreligious Council of Bosnia and Herzegovina (Međureligijsko vijeće u Bosni i Hercegovini, MRV) is a Bosnian-Herzegovinian NGO established in 1997 with help from the World Conference of Religions for Peace. Its founding members included Grand Mufti Mustafa Cerić, Metropolitan Nikolaj of Dabar-Bosnia, Cardinal and Archbishop of Vrhbosna Vinko Puljić, and Jakob Finci of Jewish Community of Bosnia and Herzegovina.
