= Federal Supreme Court of Switzerland =

Supreme court of Switzerland

Coordinates: 46°31′10″N 6°38′39″E

- Bundesgericht (German); Tribunal fédéral (French); Tribunale federale (Italian); Tribunal federal (Romansh)
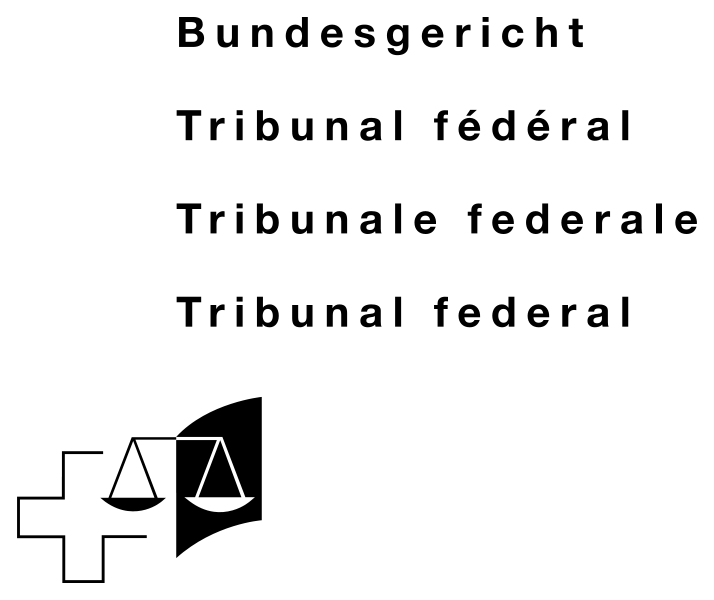

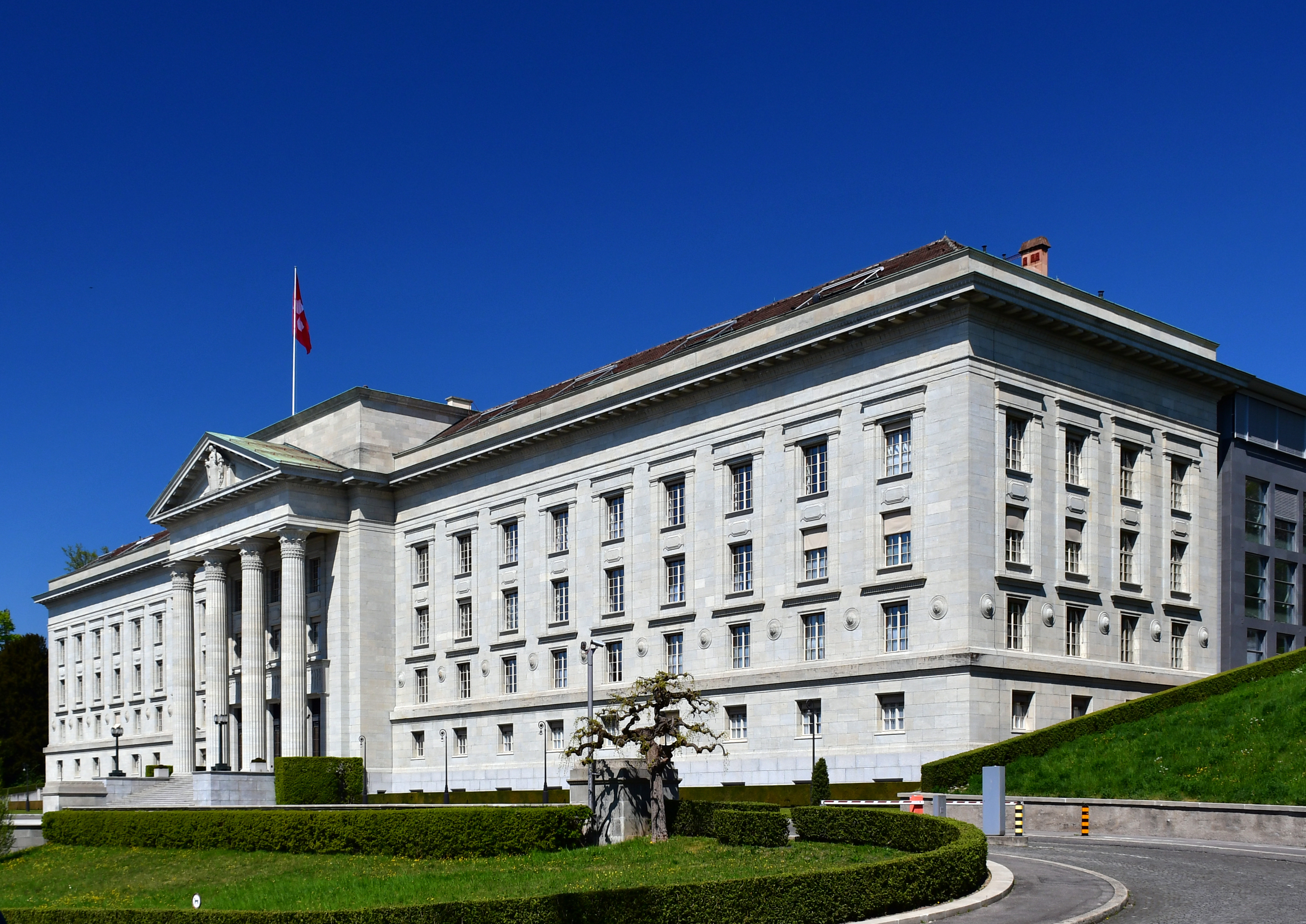
- Interactive map of Federal Supreme Court of Switzerland
- Jurisdiction: Switzerland
- Location: Lausanne
- Motto: (in Latin) "Lex, justitia, pax" (in English) "Law, justice, peace"
- Authorised by: Swiss Federal Constitution
- Appeals from: Lower Swiss courts, and arbitral tribunals such as the Court of Arbitration for Sport
- Website: www.bger.ch

The Federal Supreme Court of Switzerland (German: Bundesgericht [ˈbʊndəsɡəˌʁɪçt]; French: Tribunal fédéral [tʁibynal fedeʁal]; Italian: Tribunale federale [tribuˈnaːle fedeˈraːle]; Romansh: Tribunal federal; sometimes the Swiss Federal Tribunal) is the supreme court of the Swiss Confederation and the head of the Swiss judiciary.

The Federal Supreme Court is headquartered in the Federal Courthouse in Lausanne in the canton of Vaud. Two divisions of the Federal Supreme Court, the third and the fourth public law division (until the end of 2022 the first and second social law division and formerly called Federal Insurance Court, as an organizationally independent unit of the Federal Supreme Court), are located in Lucerne. The Federal Assembly elects 40 justices to the Federal Supreme Court. The current president of the court is François Chaix.

== Functions ==
The Federal Supreme Court is the final arbiter on disputes in the field of civil law (citizens-citizens), the public arena (citizen-state), as well as in disputes between cantons or between cantons and the Confederation. The Supreme Court's decisions in the field of human rights violations can be appealed to the European Court of Human Rights in Strasbourg.

As a state agency, the Federal Supreme Court examines the uniform application of federal law by the cantonal and federal courts of lower instance. It protects the rights that citizens have under the Federal Constitution. In the proceedings, the Federal Supreme Court examines the application of the law but does not examine the facts established by the lower courts, unless they are manifestly arbitrary.

When an appeal is filed, the Federal Supreme Court examines whether the law was correctly applied in the contested decision and thus ensures the uniform application of federal law throughout the country. Its decisions contribute to the development of the law and to its adaptation to new circumstances. The other courts and the administrative authorities use the decisions of the Federal Supreme Court as a reference and adopt their principles. Procedures before the Federal Supreme Court take place in writing. There are no court hearings with plaintiffs and defendants giving testimony and lawyers pleading their cases. The Federal Supreme Court bases its decisions on facts as they are established by the lower instances and described in the records of the previous proceedings. If the Federal Supreme Court concludes that a lower court has decided incorrectly, it overturns the contested decision and if necessary sends it back to the previous instance for a new decision. In addition to its work as the highest judicial authority, the Federal Supreme Court exercises administrative supervision over the Federal Criminal Court, the Federal Administrative Court and the Federal Patent Court.

According to the Constitution of Switzerland, the court has jurisdiction over violations of:

- Federal law
- Public international law
- Inter-cantonal law
- Cantonal constitutional rights
- Autonomy of municipalities, and other guarantees granted by the cantons to public corporate bodies
- Federal and cantonal provisions concerning political rights

Because of an emphasis on direct democracy through referendum, the Constitution precludes the Federal Supreme Court from reviewing acts of the Federal Parliament, unless such review is specifically provided for by statute.

Decisions of arbitral tribunals constituted under Swiss law, such as the Court of Arbitration for Sport, can be appealed to the Federal Supreme Court, although judicial review is limited to a very narrow set of questions of law in such cases.

== Organisation ==
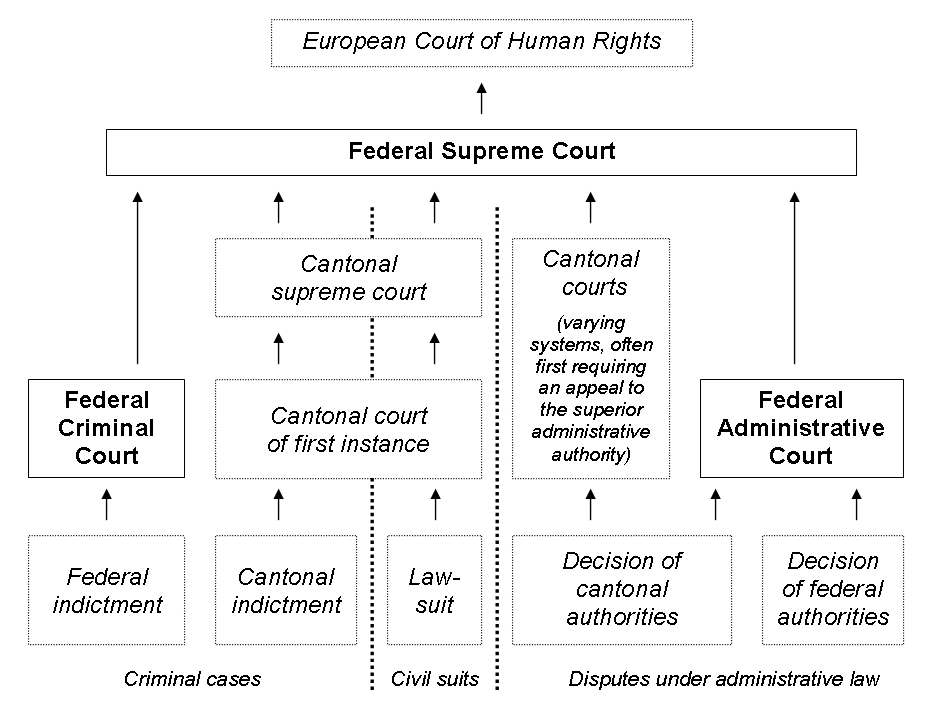
The federal judiciary within the Swiss legal system.

The supervisory bodies are the Court Assembly, the Administrative Commission and the Conference of Presidents. The Court Assembly consists of all ordinary justices and is mainly responsible for the Court's internal organisation. It designates the divisions, appoints their presidents and issues the procedural rules for the Court. The Administrative Commission is responsible for managing the Court's administration. It is composed of the President of the Federal Supreme Court, the Vice-President and one other justice. The Conference of Presidents consists of the presidents of the various divisions and is responsible for the coordination of judicial decision-making among the divisions. The President of the Federal Supreme Court acts in an advisory capacity. The Secretary-General participates in meetings held by the Court Assembly, the Administrative Commission and the Conference of Presidents in an advisory capacity. The first woman to be elected into the Federal Supreme Court was Margrith Bigler-Eggenberger in 1972 one year after women were permitted to participate in elections on a federal level.

=== Federal justices ===
A total of 40 justices sit on the bench of the Federal Supreme Court. Currently 15 women and 25 men serve as federal justices. Of the federal justices currently serving on the bench, three have Italian, 14 French and 23 German as their native language. The justices are forbidden from engaging in any gainful occupation outside of their work as federal justices. The federal justices have the status of government officials.

The federal justices are proposed by the Judicial Committee and elected by the United Federal Assembly (National Council and Council of States) for a term of office of six years. They can be re-elected an unlimited number of times. There is, however, an upper age limit of 68. Anyone who has the right to vote at the federal level may be elected a federal justice; the law does not prescribe any legal training. In practice, however, only proven jurists from the judiciary, practicing legal profession, academia or the public sector are elected.

=== Deputy federal justices ===
The Federal Supreme Court numbers 19 deputy justices, who are also elected by the Federal Assembly. Of the deputy justices currently sitting on the bench, two have Italian, five French and 12 German as their native language. Nine of the deputy justices are women. The deputy federal justices serve in a part-time capacity, otherwise they are professors, practicing lawyers or cantonal judges. As a general rule, they serve as replacements for justices who have recused themselves or have taken ill, or when the Court's docket has become overly full. In the proceedings on which they sit they have the same rights and obligations as the ordinary federal justices.

=== Court clerks ===
The court clerks are the judicial staff of the justices. Previously their primary task was to draft the written judgements after the decisions had been rendered in court. Due to the increasing case load of the Court, the court clerks are now also tasked with drafting the draft ruling in many cases. They also are involved in an advisory capacity in the preparatory stages of proceedings and during deliberations. They draft the final text of rulings based on the remarks made by the members of the division. Currently 180 court clerks serve on the Federal Supreme Court, approximately half of whom are women.

== Divisions ==
The 40 federal justices are elected by the United Federal Assembly. The Federal Supreme Court is composed of eight divisions, with five justices each. The tasks of the divisions differ according to the legal domains they cover (public law, private law, criminal law).

First Public Law Division

Expropriations, national and regional spatial planning and construction law, environmental protection, political rights, international judicial cooperation in criminal matters, road traffic (including the revocation of driving licences), citizenship, public service personnel, fundamental rights such as equality under the law, guarantee of ownership, freedom of art and guarantees of due process.
Division president: Thomas Müller
Judges: François Chaix, Lorenz Kneubühler, Laurent Merz, Karin Scherrer Reber

Second Public Law Division

Rights of foreigners, public commercial law and other areas of administrative law (e.g. state liability, subsidies, radio and television), fundamental rights such as freedom of religion and conscience, freedom of language and economic freedom.
Division president: Florence Aubry Girardin
Judges: Yves Donzallaz, Julia Hänni, Marianne Ryter, Matthias Kradolfer

Third Public Law Division

Taxes, old-age and survivors’ insurance, disability insurance, loss of earnings compensation, health insurance and occupational pensions.
Division president: Margit Moser-Szeless
Judges: Thomas Stadelmann, Francesco Parrino, Michael Beusch, Susanne Bollinger

Fourth Public Law Division

Disability insurance, accident insurance, unemployment insurance, cantonal social insurance, family allowances, social assistance, military insurance, supplementary benefits and transition benefits for older unemployed persons.
Division president: Daniela Viscione
Judges: Marcel Maillard, Alexia Heine, Jean Métral, Daniela Thurnherr Keller

First Civil Law Division

Code of Obligations (law of obligations), insurance contracts, intellectual property rights, competition law: national and international arbitration, provisional and final dismissals of objection.
Division president: Christoph Hurni
Judges: Christina Kiss, Christian Denys, Yves Rüedi, Marie-Chantal Eddé

Second Civil Law Division

Civil Code (law of persons, family law, law of succession and property law), proceedings concerning debt recovery and bankruptcy (without provisional and final dismissals of objection).
Division president: Grégory Bovey
Judges: Stephan Hartmann, Federica De Rossa, Christian Josi, Arthur Brunner

First Criminal Law Division

Substantive criminal law (without the execution of penalties and measures), Code of Criminal Procedure and appeals against final rulings in criminal proceedings (without no-proceedings orders and abandoning proceedings).
Division president: Giuseppe Muschietti
Judges: Rolf von Felten, Sandra Wohlhauser, Patrick Guidon, David Glassey

Second Criminal Law Division

Execution of penalties and measures, interlocutory rulings in criminal proceedings, no-proceedings orders and abandoning proceedings.
Division president: Bernard Abrecht
Judges: Beatrice van de Graaf, Sonja Koch, Christian Kölz, Yann-Eric Hofmann

== Full-time positions since 2007 ==
Raw data

Source: "Federal Finance Administration FFA: Data portal".

== See also ==
- Federal courts of Switzerland
  - Federal Criminal Court of Switzerland
  - Federal Administrative Court
  - Federal Patent Court
- Constituent Assembly of Valais

== Notes and references ==
- "Federal Supreme Court" in German, French and Italian in the online Historical Dictionary of Switzerland.
