= Aleksandra Leliwa-Kopystyńska =

Polish physicist (1937–2023)

- Born: August 20, 1937; Warsaw, Poland
- Died: March 18, 2023 (aged 85); Warsaw
- Occupation: physicist

Aleksandra Halina Lelywa-Kupistynska (August 20, 1937 in Warsaw - March 18, 2023) was a Polish physicist, professor at the University of Warsaw. In 2018–2022, she was President of the Society for Children of the Holocaust (SDH).

== Life ==
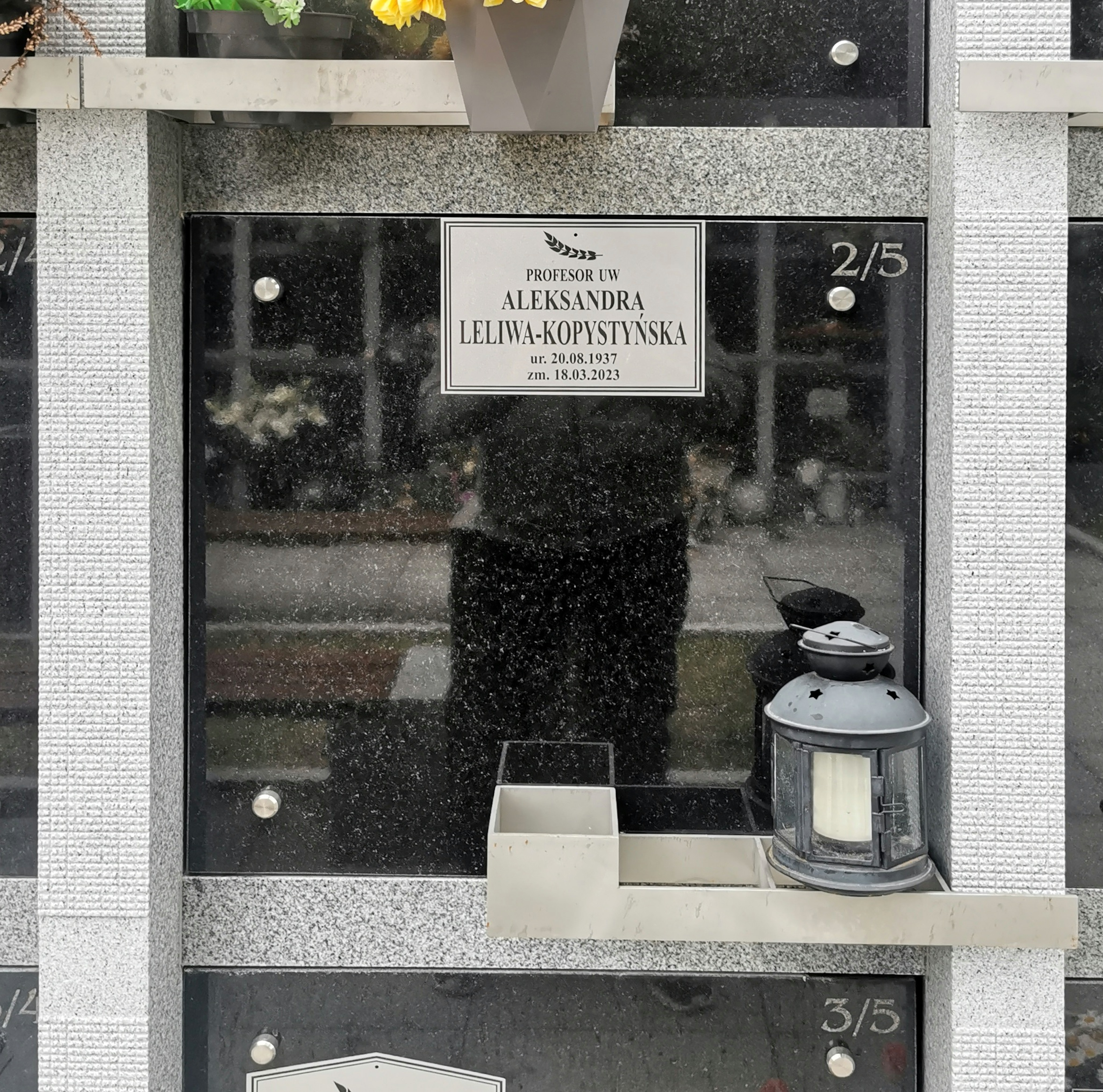
The grave of Aleksandra Lewa-Kupistyńska at the Powązki Military Cemetery in Warsaw

Aleksandra Halina Lelywa-Kupistynska was born into a Polish-Jewish family, the daughter of Józef Smitanowski, a sergeant in the Polish army who received the Cross of Independence in 1942, and Irena Nye Wakenbaum. She survived World War II along with his mother and older brother Stephen.

Lelywa-Kupistynska specialized in experimental atomic physics, and atomic and molecular spectroscopy. She was a researcher at the Institute of Experimental Physics for many years and was also a member of the Polish Physics Society, serving as its Secretary General in 2002–2003. She initiated the creation of the Women's Division of the PTF and served as the Chairman of its Audit Committee. She was also a member of the Children of the Holocaust Association, serving as vice president from 2009 and President from 2018 to 2022. She was a member of the Social College POLIN Museum of the History of Polish Jews in Warsaw.

== Works ==
- Wykłady z fizyki atomu (1989, ISBN 830108829X)
- Informacja obrazowa: własności i detekcja promieniowania e-m, psychologia widzenia, przetwarzanie obrazów (1992, współautor, ISBN 8320412773)
