= Aleksandr Evlakhov =

Russian literary critic and doctor (1880–1966)

Aleksandr Mikhailovich Evlakhov
- Born: Aleksandr Mikhailovich Evlakhov; Александр Михайлович Евлахов; 8 August 1880; Odessa
- Died: 28 May 1966 (aged 85); Leningrad
- Occupation: literary critic

Aleksandr Mikhailovich Evlakhov (Russian: Александр Михайлович Евлахов; 8 August 1880 — 28 May 1966) was a Russian literary critic and doctor. Professor, Rector of Rostov State University in 1920.

== Biography ==
Aleksandr Mikhailovich Evlakhov was born on 8 August 1880 in Odessa in the family of a gymnasium teacher. In 1898 he entered the Physics and Mathematics Department of the Saint Petersburg University, but already a year later he moved to the History and Philology Department, which he graduated in 1903. In 1902 he also graduated from the St. Petersburg Archaeological Institute and worked there for a while. In 1907 he became a Master of Literature. Privatdocent of St. Petersburg University (since 1908), Kiev University (since 1908), associate professor and then professor at Warsaw University (since 1909). In the years 1907-1913 he traveled through Europe to study painting.

Evlakhov also taught at Karl May School. He wrote poems and stories and was the author of the operatic libretto "Princess Mary".

In 1915, together with all the teachers and students of the University of Warsaw, he was evacuated to Rostov-on-Don. In the same place as a literary critic he wrote articles for the newspaper Priazovsky Kray. In 1917, in Rostov-on-Don was published the final volume of his work "Introduction to the Philosophy of Artistic Creativity. Experience of historical and literary methodology". In 1920 he was appointed rector of Rostov State University, although he held this post less than a year.

In 1925 he graduated from the Medical Faculty of the Baku University, and soon received an offer from Vyacheslav Ivanov to head the departments of Western literature and the History of art there. Since 1928 he worked a psychiatrist, and since 1944 he was a professor of forensic psychiatry. Since 1934 he taught Italian at the Leningrad Conservatory.

He died in Leningrad on 28 May 1966.
