= Katarzyna Chałasińska-Macukow =

Polish physicist

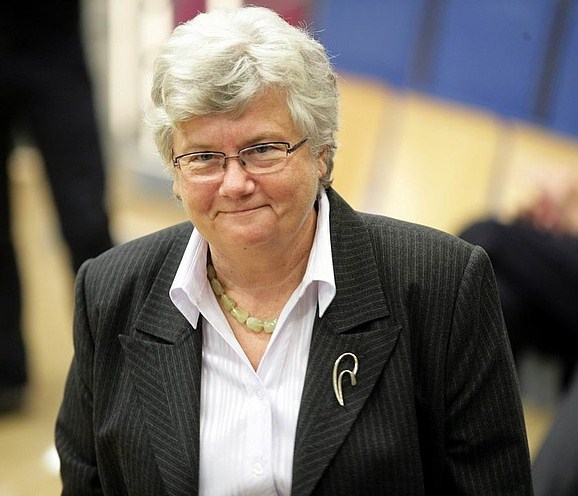
Katarzyna Chałasińska-Macukow in 2010.

Katarzyna Chałasińska-Macukow (born 20 March 1946 in Łódź, Poland) is a Polish physicist and professor at the University of Warsaw. In 2005 and again in 2008 elected for the post of the rector of the University of Warsaw.

Fellow and from 2008 Chairman of the Science Board in Collegium Invisibile.

== Life and education ==
She is a daughter of Józef Chałasiński, Polish sociologist and a sister of Grzegorz Chałasiński, Polish chemist. Alumni of the IX Klementyna Hoffmanowa High School in Warsaw. In 1970, after finishing Master Studies on Faculty of Physics, University of Warsaw, she worked for 4 years in Institute of Physics, Warsaw University of Technology. She returned to University of Warsaw where she was hired in Institute of Experimental Physics (up to 1980) and earned her PhD in 1979. Since 1980 she has been involved in Institute of Geophysics. She received tenure in physical sciences in 1988. In 1992 she became an associate professor and full professor in 1997. By the decision of President of Poland she received professor scientific degree on 20 November 1997. She also worked as an associate professor on Université Laval, Québec, Canada in 1982-1983.

Apart from scientific and didactic activity, she is also involved in cultural growth of academia being a patron of Hybrids Theatre UW and Academic Theater UW.

She was awarded Officer's Cross of the Order of Polonia Restituta in 2011.

== Senior positions and memberships ==
She held a series of senior positions at the University of Warsaw. She was associate dean (1995-1996) and was elected a dean at Faculty of Physics (1996-2002). In 2002 she was designated a vice-rector of finances and cadre politics. In 2005 she was elected for the pose of the rector of University of Warsaw. In 2008 she was elected for a second four-year cadency.

She is also a member of Polish Physical Society. She held the positions of vice-president in 2001-2003 and president in 2014-2017.

She is associative member of Warsaw Scientific Society and also fellow in Collegium Invisibile and chairman (from 2008) of the Science Board.

== Scientific interest ==
Currently she is working in the Department of Information Optics at Institute of Geophysics, University of Warsaw. Her scientific interests cover holography, optical and hybrid information processing, correlation methods, image recognition and classification, photonics applications in information technology.
