= Faculty of Culture and Arts, University of Warsaw =

Division of the University of Warsaw

Faculty of Culture and Arts
- Wydział Nauk o Kulturze i Sztuce
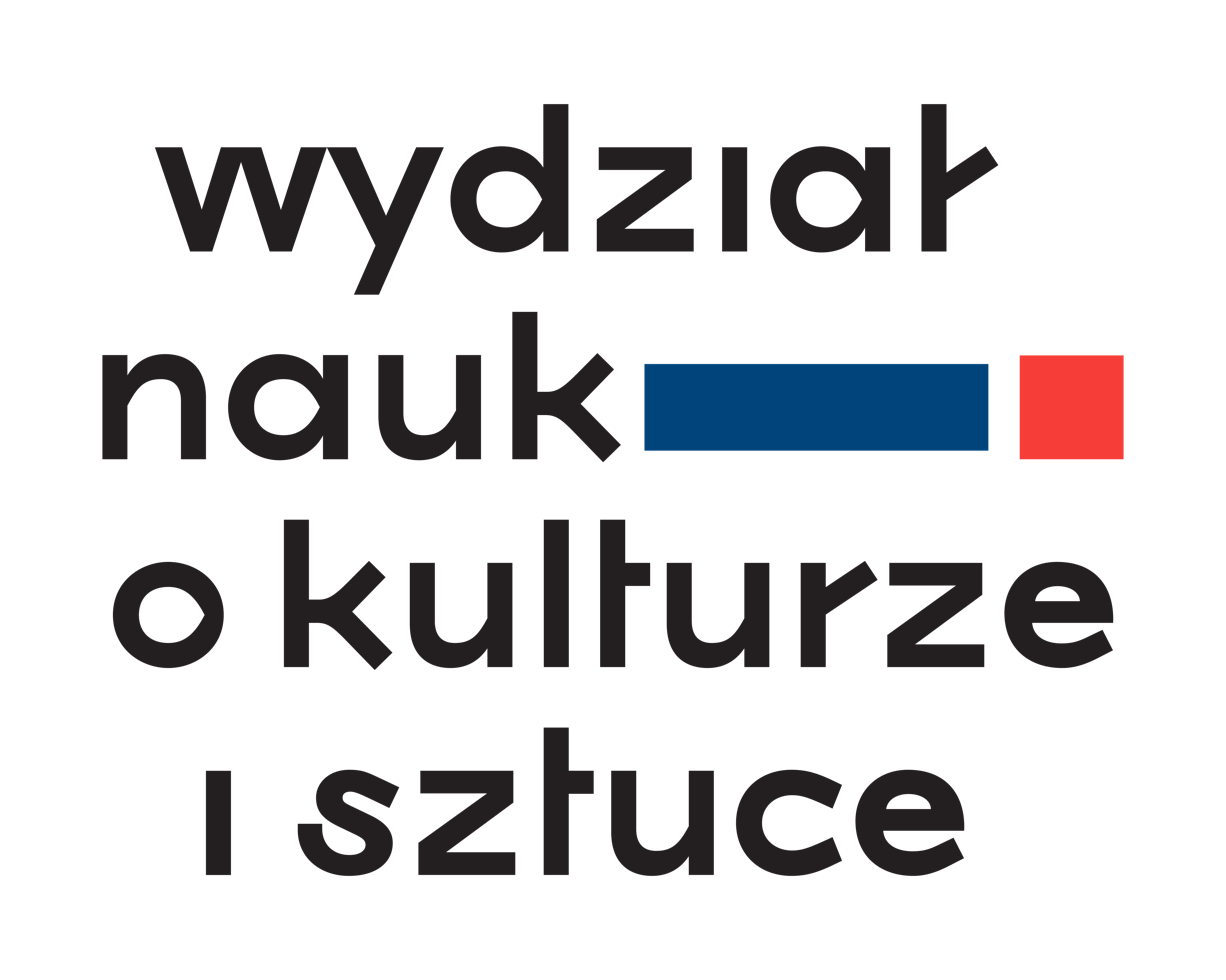
- Type: Faculty
- Established: 1 September 2020
- Parent institution: University of Warsaw
- Dean: Małgorzata Karpińska
- Location: Krakowskie Przedmieście 26/28, Warsaw, 00-927, Poland
- Website: wnks.uw.edu.pl

The Faculty of Culture and Arts (Polish: Wydział Nauk o Kulturze i Sztuce, WNKS) of the University of Warsaw is a faculty conducting study and research in fields of art history, anthropology, cultural studies and musicology. The faculty was established on 1 September 2020, as the successor to the Faculty of Historical Sciences from which the Faculty of History and the Faculty of Archeology were isolated. The incumbent dean is Małgorzata Karpińska, a historian, professor of humanities.

== Structure and studies ==
The faculty is divided into three institutes conducting research and teaching in the following courses of study:

- Institute of Ethnology and Cultural Anthropology
  - Ethnology and Cultural Anthropology (bachelor's and master's degree)
- Institute of Art History
  - Art history (bachelor's and master's degree)
  - History of Culture in the Age of Digital Humanities (master's degree)
  - Museology (postgraduate course)
- Institute of Musicology
  - Musicology (bachelor's and master's degree)
