= Katarzyna Kasia =

Polish philosopher (born 1978)

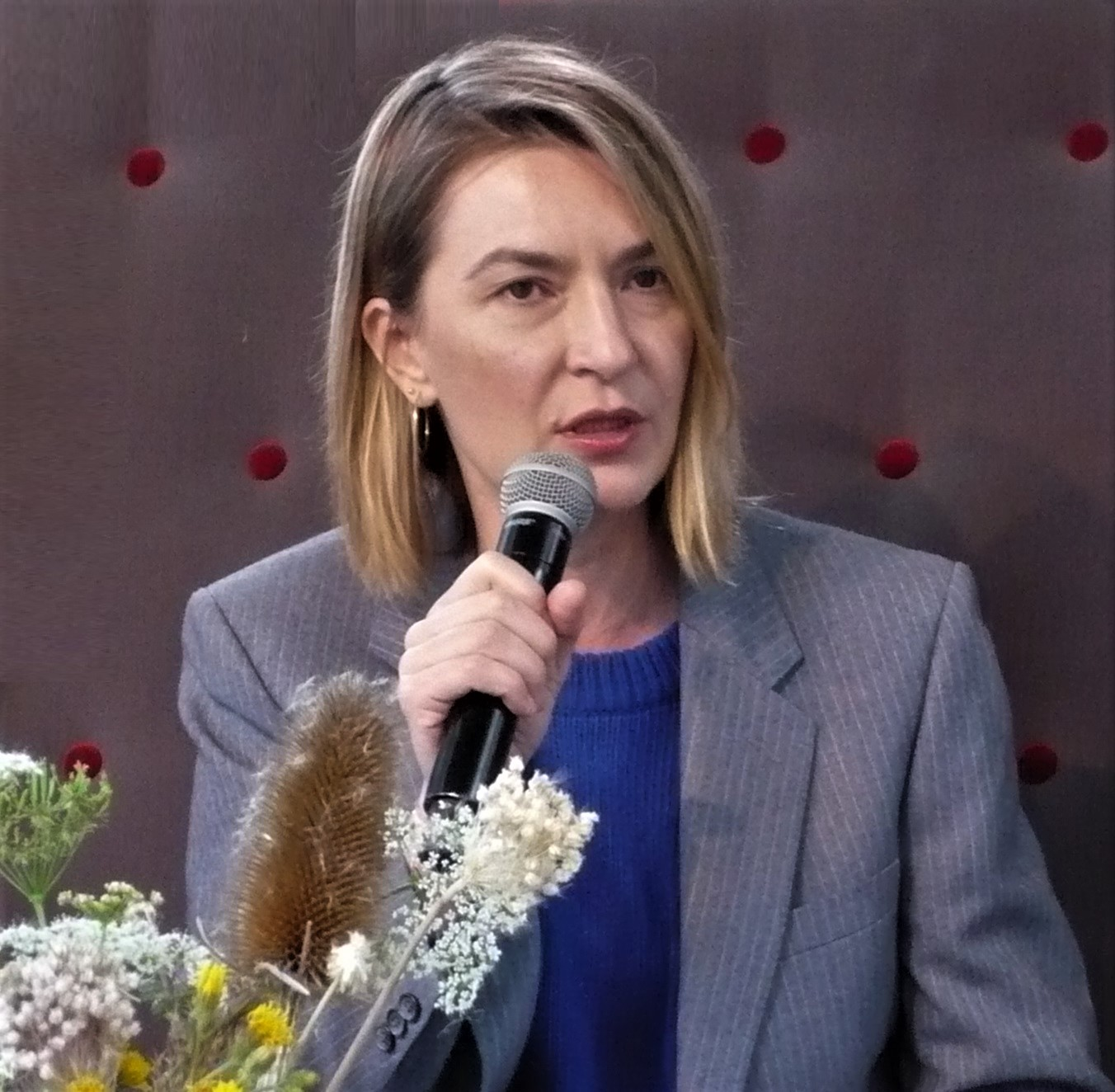
- Katarzyna Kasia (2022)
- Born: 31 January 1978 (age 47); Warsaw, Poland
- Occupation(s): Journalist, philosopher

Katarzyna Ida Kasia (born 31 January 1978) is a Polish philosopher, academic teacher, columnists and a journalist working for radio and television. She is also a Ph.D of philosophy.

== Biography ==
Kasia was born on 31 January 1978 in Warsaw. She graduated from Stefan Batory 2nd High School and from the Faculty of Philosophy and Sociology of University of Warsaw (2002). In 2006 she became a doctor of philosophy – her dissertation was titled Concept of form in view of Luigi Pareyson (pl. Koncepcja formy w ujęciu Luigi Pareysona). Her thesis supervisor was Alicja Kuczyńska.

She was a scholarship holder in the Ministry of Foreign Affairs of Italy and The Kościuszko Foundation. Between 2016 and 2020 she was a deputy dean at The Faculty of Visual Culture Management at Academy of Fine Arts in Warsaw. At the academy, she is a lecturer in history of philosophy, aesthetic and philosophy of culture. She also teaches at Aleksander Zelwerowicz Theatre Academy in Warsaw.

Since 12 April 2019 Kasia is a commentator in a TVN programme Szkło Kontaktowe, and since February 2020 she joined the editors group of this programme. Together with Gregorz Markowski, she also appears in the programme Nowy Świt in an online radiostation Nowy Świat. She is a regular columnist at Kultura Liberalna and a member od editors group at Przegląd Filozoficzno-Literacki. She is also a member of Team Europe. Together with Karolina Wigura she creates a vediepodcast Widok z K2.

Since 2021 she is a jury member of the contest Literacka Podróż Hestii.

In 2023 she became a columnist of Newsweek Polska. In November 2023 she got a title of Warszawianka Roku. In 2024 she got the award of Media Personality of the Year during the Mariusz Walter Awards.

She translated into Polish texts of Italian philosophers, such as Luigi Pareyson, Gianni Vattimo and others.

== Personal life ==
She is a daughter of Andrzej Kasia and Barbara Czerska-Pieńkowska.

== Bibliography ==
- Rzemiosło formowania. Luigiego Pareysona estetyka formatywności, 2008
- Doświadczenie estetyczne i wspólnota spektaklu, 2019

=== Translations ===
- Luigi Pareyson, Estetyka : teoria formatywności, 2009
- Gianni Vattimo, Piergiorgio Paterlini, Nie być Bogiem : autobiografia na cztery ręce, 2011
- Poza interpretacją : znaczenie hermeneutyki dla filozofii, 2011
