= Aleksandra Pawliszyn =

Polish philosopher (born 1958)

Aleksandra Pawliszyn (born 30 December 1958) is a Polish philosopher, specializing in the areas of phenomenology and philosophical hermeneutics.

== Biography ==
She obtained her doctorate in 1991 at Warsaw University on the basis of a work titled: Czynności rozumienia w hermeneutyce Gadamerai psychoanalizie Freuda, and qualified as an assistant professor in 2002, also at Warsaw University, on the basis of a work titled: Krajobrazyczasu. Obecne dociekania egzystencjalnej wartości czasu. For a period of eight years she was head of The Department of Learning Theory at the Institute of Philosophy, Sociology and Journalism at Gdańsk University. From 2015 she has been a member of the International Husserl and Phenomenology Research Society (USA).

== Sources ==
- Skryte podstawy rozumienia. Hermeneutyka a psychoanaliza, Wydawnictwo Uniwersytetu Gdańskiego, Gdańsk 1993. Jej merytoryczne przesłanie konsultowane listownie z Hansem-Georgiem Gadamerem, a wydanie dotował Minister Edukacji Narodowej
- Świat człowieka i Kosmos – poprzez metaforę, Humaniora, Poznań 1999.
- Filozofia a humanistyka, Humaniora, Poznań 2000.
- Misterium śmierci spotkaniem ze sobą. Egzystencjalne interpretacje fenomenu śmierci, (red.) Aleksandra Pawliszyn i Włodzimierz Pawliszyn, Wydawnictwo Uniwersytetu Gdańskiego, Gdańsk 1996.
- Ontologiczne studium metafory, t. I Biblioteki „Hermeneutyka Przejść”, Wydawnictwo Uniwersytetu Gdańskiego, Gdańsk 2009.
- The Truth of Suffering (Levinas) and the Truth Crystallized in the Work of Art (Gadamer), “Analecta Husserliana”, vol. XCII, 2006, [Springer], also abstract in The Philosopher's Index.
- A Temporality of Dasein (Heidegger) and a Time of the Other (Levinas), „Analecta Husserliana”, vol. LXXVII, 2002, [Kluwer Academic Publishers], also abstract in The Philosopher's Index.
- An Archeology of HappeningsInspired by Death. The Philosophical Word before that which Is Inevitable w wydawnictwie Lambert, Academic Publishing.
