= Main Gate of the University of Warsaw =

Historic gate in Warsaw, Poland

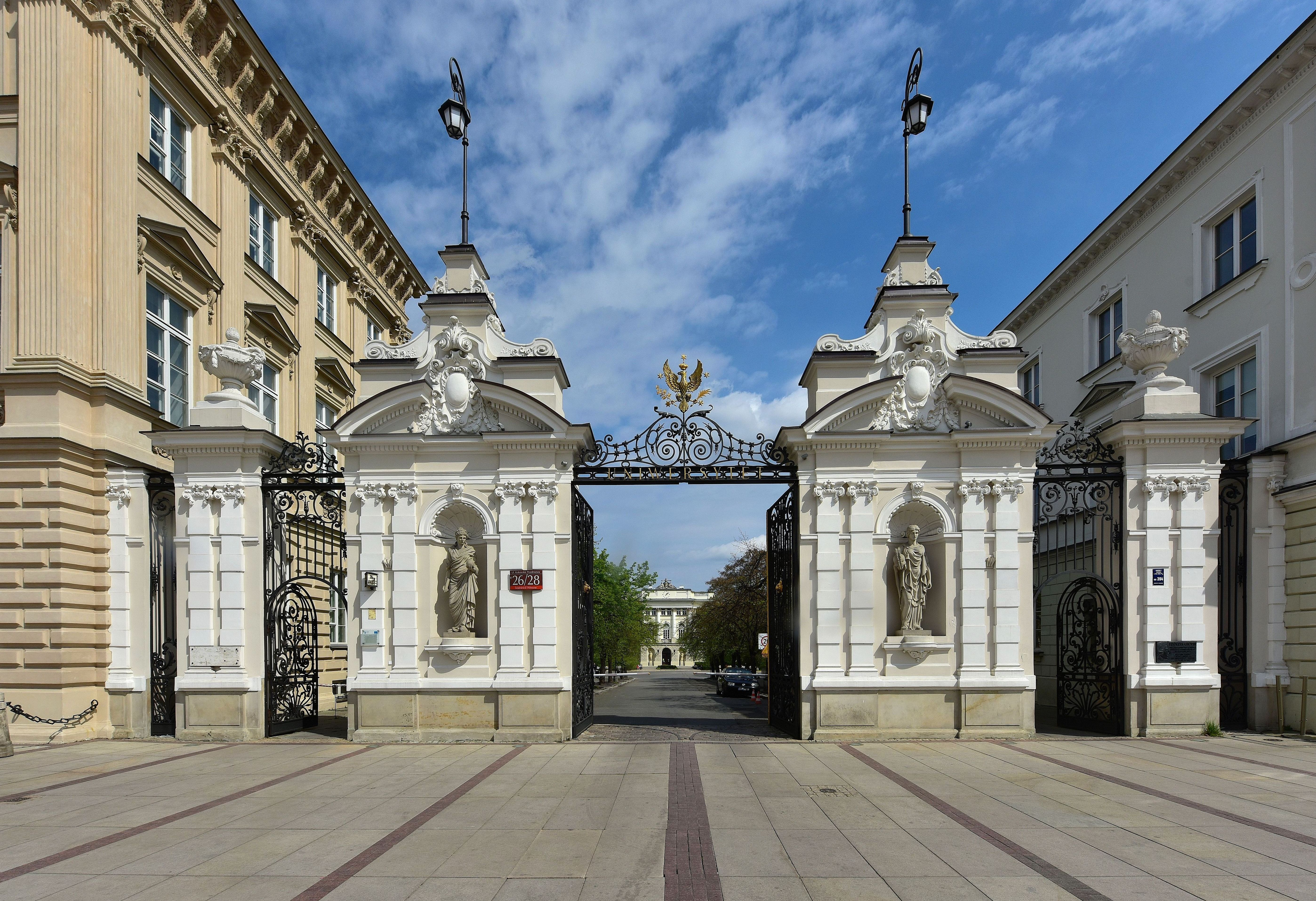
- The gate in 2019.
- Interactive map of the Main Gate of the University of Warsaw area

General information
- Type: Gate
- Architectural style: Baroque Revival
- Location: Downtown, Warsaw, Poland, 26/28 Kraków Suburb Street
- Coordinates: 52°14′23″N 21°01′01″E
- Completed: 1911

Design and construction
- Architect: Stefan Szyller

The Main Gate of the University of Warsaw (Polish: Brama Główna Uniwersytetu Warszawskiego), also known as the University Gate (Polish: Brama Uniwersytecka), is a Baroque Revival gate at the main entrance to the campus of the University of Warsaw. It is located at 26/28 Kraków Suburb Street. It was designed by Stefan Szyller, and constructed in 1911.

== History ==
Originally, in the location was placed a different gate, designed by Jan Zygmunt Deybel and Joachim Daniel von Jauch, and commissioned by king Augustus II the Strong in 1732. It was topped with a large sculpture of a metal globe. The gate survived until 12 June 1819. In 1823, in its place was constructed a smaller gate, placed further into the university property.

Current gate was opened in 1911, while also donating to the university a road leading to its campus. It was designed in the Baroque Revival around 1900 by Stefan Szyller. In 1916, above the entrance was placed a sculpture on a letter A with a crown above it, then a symbol of the university, referring to its founder, Alexander I of Russia. After the end of the Second World War, it was replaced with a sculpture of an eagle, surrounded by three stars. After 1989, above its head was added a crown, signifying the end of the communist period in the country.

In the niches of the gates, on both sides of the entrance, are placed two statues, depicting Urania, a symbol of knowledge, and Athena, a symbol of piece. They were designed by Zygmunt Langman, and inspired by works in the Vatican Museums. They were heavily damaged during the Second World WAr, and were removed after its end. The statues were restored and returned there in 1982.

In 1984, the gate was entered into the heritage list.
