= Krystyna Secomska =

Polish art historian (1939–2010)

- Born: 17 January 1939; Warsaw, Poland
- Died: 14 June 2010 (aged 71); Warsaw
- Occupation: Art historian

Krystyna Secomska (17 January 1939 in Warsaw – 14 June 2010 in Warsaw) was a Polish art historian specializing in 15th- and 16th-century Burgundian painting.

== Life and career ==
She was the daughter of Kazimierz Szczęstochowa, an economist and lecturer at the SGH Warsaw School of Economics. Secomska began her studies at the University of Warsaw in 1955, graduating in 1962 with Doctor of Philosophy earned under the supervision of Professor Michał Walicki. She was a research fellow at the Institute of Art of the Polish Academy of Sciences and worked at the institute's library.

== Publications and research papers ==
- Mistrzowie i książęta. Malarstwo francuskie XV i XVI wieku, Warszawa: Wydawnictwa Artystyczne i Filmowe, 1989. ISBN 83-221-0435-9.
- Malarstwo francuskie XVII wieku, Warszawa: Wydawnictwa Artystyczne i Filmowe, 1985, ISBN 83-221-0219-4
- Tintoretto, Warszawa: Arkady, 1984.
- Godzinki księcia de Berry, Warszawa: Wydawnictwo Arkady 1979, ISBN 83-213-2914-4
- Legenda Aleksandra Wielkiego w "Panthenonie" sandomierskim: miniatury w kodeksie z 1335 roku Wrocław : Zakład Narodowy im. Ossolińskich - Wydaw. Polskiej Akademii Nauk, 1977.
- Romańskie kościoły z emporami zachodnimi na obszarze Polski, Czech i Węgier Wrocław, Zakład Narodowy im. Ossolińskich, 1974.

oraz

- Family tomb at the Wawrzyszew Cemetery in Warsaw
  Robert Genaille, Maciej Monkiewicz, Ewa Maliszewska, Krystyna Secomska, Antoni Ziemba: Encyklopedia malarstwa flamandzkiego i holenderskiego. Warszawa: Wydawnictwa Artystyczne i Filmowe: Wydaw. Naukowe PWN, 2001. ISBN 83-221-0686-6.
- Adam S. Labuda, red. Krystyna Secomska Malarstwo gotyckie w Polsce (t I-III) Warszawa 2013, Wydawnictwo DiG, ISBN 83-7181-318-X praca naukowa,
- Malarstwo gotyckie w Polsce. 1, Synteza / pod red. Adama S. Labudy i Krystyny Secomskiej; Instytut Sztuki Polskiej Akademii Nauk. - Warszawa : DiG, 2004, ISBN 83-7181-318-X (całość t. I-III)
- Malarstwo gotyckie w Polsce. 2, Katalog zabytków / pod red. Adama S. Labudy i Krystyny Secomskiej przy współudziale Andrzeja Włodarka [et al.] ; Instytut Sztuki Polskiej Akademii Nauk. - Warszawa: DiG, 2004, ISBN 83-7181-318-X (całość t. I-III)
- Malarstwo gotyckie w Polsce. 3, Album ilustracji / pod red. Adama S. Labudy i Krystyny Secomskiej przy współudziale Andrzeja Włodarka [et al.] ; Instytut Sztuki Polskiej Akademii Nauk. - Warszawa: DiG, 2004, ISBN 83-7181-318-X (całość t. I-III)
- Théophile-Alexandre Steinlen 1859-1923 - wystawa ze zbiorów muzeum Petit-Palais w Genewie; [katalog oprac. przez muzeum Petit-Palais w Genewie ; tł. i red. katalogu Krystyna Secomska]; Muzeum Narodowe w Warszawie [et al.]. - Warszawa: Muzeum Narodowe, 1978.
- Malarstwo angielskie od Hogartha do Turnera - wystawa przygotowana przez British Council 18 lutego - 19 marca 1967; Muzeum Narodowe w Warszawie / [tł. wstępu Jan Białostocki; tł. katalogu Krystyna Sekomska]. - Warszawa: Muzeum Narodowe, 1967.
