= Jan Józef Kasprzyk =

Polish historian and politician

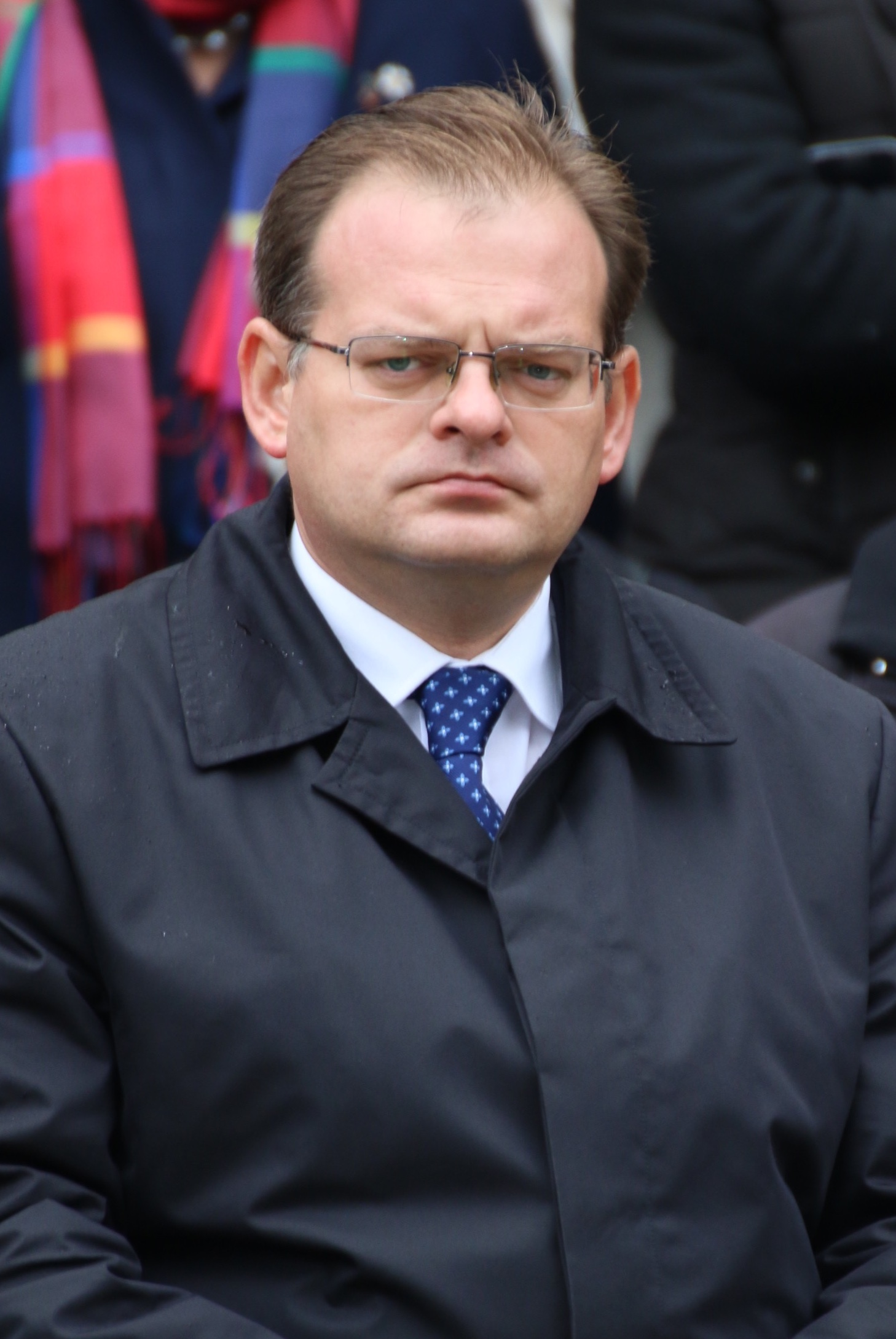

Head of the Office for War Veterans and Victims of Oppression Acting
- In office 1 January 2016 – 21 February 2024
- President: Andrzej Duda
- Prime Minister: Beata Szydło
- Preceded by: Jan Stanisław Ciechanowski
- Succeeded by: Lech Parell

Advisor to the President of the Republic of Poland
- Incumbent
- Assumed office 18 August 2025
- President: Karol Nawrocki

Personal details
- Born: 12 March 1975 (age 51)
- Education: University of Warsaw
- Profession: Historian

Jan Józef Kasprzyk (born 12 March 1975) is a Polish historian and politician. He was the Head of the Office for War Veterans and Victims of Oppression, serving from 1 January 2016 to 21 February 2024. He then worked at the Institute of National Remembrance, led by Karol Nawrocki. After Nawrocki's inauguration as President of the Republic, Kasprzyk was appointed advisor of the President in August 2025.

== Biography ==
Kasprzyk holds a master's degree from the University of Warsaw. In the years 1994-1996 he was a journalist for Radio Warsaw. He is the longtime president of the Association of Piłsudskiites. Kasprzyk is the author of several books on the Second Polish Republic. As a Piłsudskiite he long advocated for the re-building of a Polish Elite, alike to the one in interwar Poland. He long promoted geopolitical ideas such as the Intermarium, national ambition and Independence Thought (Myśl Niepodległościowa.)

In 2005 he was appointed as the Spokesman for the Ministry of Culture and National Heritage, serving until 2007. From 2005 to 2006 Kasprzyk was the chairman of the Ochota District Council. He was a member of the Political Council of Law and Justice in the years 2006–2010. Kasprzyk serves as the vice chairman of the Ochota District Council.

On 8 December 2015 Kasprzyk was appointed by the Minister of Family, Labour and Social Policy, Elżbieta Rafalska, as the Deputy Head of the Office for War Veterans and Victims of Oppression. On 1 February 2016 Prime Minister Beata Szydło entrusted him with the responsibilities of the Head of the Office of War Veterans and Victims of Oppression.

== Awards (Republic of Poland) ==
- Order of Polonia Restituta
- Silver Cross of Merit
- Medal Pro Patria
- Pro Memoria Medal
- Medal for the 100th Anniversary of Independence
