= Przemysław Krych =

Polish entrepreneur, investor, philanthropist, anti-communist opposition activist

- Born: 1966 (age 59–60)
- Education: Adam Mickiewicz University in Poznań Faculty of Law and Administration
- Occupations: entrepreneur, investor, philanthropist

Przemysław Tomasz Krych (born 1966) is a Polish entrepreneur, investor, philanthropist, and anti-communist opposition activist.

== Biography ==
During his high school and university years he was involved with anti-communist opposition - supporting Solidarity - as activist of both: Independent Youth Movement as well as Independent Students' Association. In 1989 took part in student strike. Upon Independent Students' Association being legalized he was elected as Chairman of Audit Committee at the Adam Mickiewicz University in Poznań. Graduated (summa cum laude) from the Adam Mickiewicz University in Poznań Faculty of Law and Administration, where - then - worked as assistant professor. In 1993 passed barrister exam and was appointed to the Bar at the District Chamber in Poznań.

In 2001 he founded Cornerstone Partners (currently Cornerstone Investment Management) and in 2006 – Griffin Real Estate (currently Griffin Capital Partners). Prior to founding Cornerstone Investment Management he worked as Emerging Europe Private Equity Funds Managing Director at Franklin Templeton Investments, and earlier at Bank Handlowy (currently Citi Handlowy), among others - as: Head of the Investment Committee, Member of the Credit Committee i Member of the Management Committee.

He was detained on December 17, 2017, and then temporarily arrested after the decision of the 4th Criminal Division of the Katowice-Wschód District Court on charges of paying bribes to a senator PiS Stanisław Kogut, in the form of donations - provided by third parties - to the Foundation for Disabled Persons in Stróże. On September 23, 2019, he gave an interview to Bloomberg Businessweek, in which he talked about the behind-the-scenes of the arrest. July 1, 2021, in an interview for Onet.pl mentioned the former spokesman of PiS – Adam Hofman, who, after Krych was released, offered him a meeting with Zbigniew Ziobro (at that time the Minister of Justice) and his wife Patrycja Kotecka to "clarify the situation". Another person mentioned by Krych in the interview was Krzysztof Porowski – a businessman from Sosnowiec, once accused of extortion of 5 mln PLN from the Social Insurance Institution and the corruption of the vice-president of the Katowice District Court. Before Krych's arrest, he offered to "solve the problem" for a bribe of EUR 1.5 million, and during Krych's arrest, he also offered Krych's business partner, his release for the same amount. Porowski claimed that he represents a person high in the hierarchy of the secret services. On July 4, 2021, during the first press conference after returning from Brussels, Donald Tusk mentioned the lack of reaction of the prosecutor's office and the Minister of Justice to the specific situations provided by Krych.

His arrest by the CBA and 6-month detention in 2018 were described in numerous publications as one of the most significant abuses of power against entrepreneurs by the prosecutor's office under the leadership of Zbigniew Ziobro. The case was described, among others: in the book "The Hunt - how business is destroyed in Poland" by Helena Kowalik-Ciemińska and Szymon Krawiec - editor in Wprost, and in the report "Punishing philanthropy in Poland: the case of Przemysław Krych" by Open Dialogue Foundation - as well as - in the report of the Open Dialogue Foundation and Judges Association "Themis" on the politicization of the Polish prosecutor's office in 2015-2023. The case was also mentioned as one of three examples of persecution of entrepreneurs in Poland in the written declaration Parliamentary Assembly of the Council of Europe from April 2023, where it was written: "The persecution of entrepreneurs such as Piotr Osiecki and Przemysław Krych, and recently the president of the entrepreneurs' organization Maciej Witucki continues. Actions against them, including security raids, arbitrary detentions and criminal charges, not only harm individual entrepreneurs but also foster a hostile environment for entrepreneurship and investment.".

May 6, 2020 in Telewizja Polska Wiadomości broadcast a material entitled "Who finances Hołownia's (about:Szymon Hołownia) campaign", for which this broadcaster was sued. On March 21, 2023, the program's editors apologized to Przemysław Krych for stating that he was a person "involved in suspicious dealings" and his business activities "raised huge doubts".

In February 2024, his case was included - alongside 10 other entrepreneurs and former managers of companies related to State Treasury of Poland - in an appeal from non-governmental circles calling Attorney General Adam Bodnar for "a review of politically motivated prosecutorial proceedings in 2015-2023 and the rehabilitation of the victims." The appeal was signed by 35 non-governmental organizations and 43 public figures from the world of science, culture and politics, including: former president Lech Wałęsa, Leszek Balcerowicz, Władysław Frasyniuk, Agnieszka Holland, Michał Boni, Zbigniew Hołdys, Krystyna Janda, Tomasz Lis, Hanna Machińska, Marcin Matczak, Janina Ochojska, Wojciech Sadurski, Kuba Sienkiewicz and Andrzej Zoll.

During the European Economic Congress on 7-9 May 2024 was invited as a speaker to the panel: How an unprofessional and oppressive system deals with business. In 'Rule of law and business'. May 8, 2024 - Puls Biznesu published an article "How temporary will temporary detentions be", in which it describes what changes Adam Bodnar announced in the use of temporary detention. Entrepreneurs appreciate the direction, but not their scope. The article includes Przemysław Krychs opinion from the European Economic Congress panel.

7 September 2024 - Gazeta Wyborcza publishes an interview with Przemyslaw Krych. Interview about his dentention and arrest. The interview opens: "I asked you for this interview because I want you to detail your experiences with the PiS judicial system. Today, we hear about the torture of Maciej Wąsik and Mariusz Kamiński, the martyrdom of Father Michał Olszewski detained in connection with grants from the infamous Justice Fund. Meanwhile, the cases involving businessmen targeted by the authorities, accused of corruption by Ziobro's prosecutors, have gone quiet. I’d like to break that silence.".

30 September 2024 - The Parliamentary Assembly of the Council of Europe expressed concern regarding the politicisation of the State prosecution service in Poland. Issued a written declaration that urges the Polish Government to conduct a full and transparent audit of all cases flagged by members, civil society and media, dismiss prosecutors who abused power and hold them accountable while rehabilitating their victims including Przemysław Krych. the declaration mentions also: Paweł Wojtunik, Jakub Karnowski and other politically motivated cases, including: Piotr Osiecki, Maciej Bodnar, Michał Lubiński, Rafał Markiewicz, Bartosz Kramek, Tomasz Misiak, Wojciech Łączewski and Marcin Fall.

29 November 2024, Adam Bodnar, Dariusz Korneluk, and Katarzyna Kwiatkowska received an "Appeal for a review of politically motivated prosecutorial proceedings from 2015 to 2023 and the rehabilitation of victims," including the case of Przemysław Krych. The appeal was signed by, among others, Marek Belka, Andrzej Blikle, Michał Boni, Władysław Frasyniuk, Jarosław Kurski, Agnieszka Holland, Open Dialogue Foundation, and the Polish Business Council.

14 April 2025 - The District Prosecutor's Office in Lublin initiates an investigation concerning the abuse of power by the CBA and the Regional Prosecutor's Office in Katowice.

20 May 2026 - During the debate “Challenges and Support Strategies in the Reconstruction Process of Ukraine”, organised by the Bronisław Geremek Foundation, Przemysław Krych spoke on issues related to European security and geopolitics.

11 June 2026 - a coalition of business organizations, including the Polish Business Roundtable (Polska Rada Biznesu), Lewiatan Confederation, Employers of Poland and Corporate Connections, acting within the SprawdzaMY deregulation initiative, proposed legislative amendments aimed at reforming the use of pre-trial detention in Poland. The proposal sought to strengthen procedural safeguards, increase judicial oversight and limit the excessive use of long-term pre-trial detention, particularly in economic and business-related cases. The initiative was supported by references to recommendations issued by the Commissioner for Human Rights (Poland) and analyses published by the Helsinki Foundation for Human Rights. During the public debate surrounding the proposed reforms, the case of Przemysław Krych was cited by representatives of the business community as one of the examples illustrating concerns over the prolonged use of pre-trial detention in economic proceedings.

In October 2026, Przemysław Krych was featured as a case study in a written contribution by the Open Dialogue Foundation to the OSCE Warsaw Human Dimension Conference, entitled Transnational Financial Repression against Philanthropists and Donors as a Strategy to Undermine Support for Human Rights and Humanitarian Aid Work. The contribution examined his prosecution in Poland, arguing that charitable donations had been recharacterised as bribes and presenting his case as an example of the use of legal and financial mechanisms to target philanthropists and undermine support for independent media, human rights initiatives and humanitarian assistance to Ukraine.

In October 2026, Przemysław Krych was featured as one of the case studies in a written contribution by the Open Dialogue Foundation to Plenary Session 5: Rule of Law II of the OSCE Warsaw Human Dimension Conference, entitled Politicisation of the Prosecution Service and Malicious Prosecution of Entrepreneurs in Poland: Rule of Law Implications. The submission examined allegations of politically motivated prosecution of Polish entrepreneurs between 2015 and 2023, including Krych's arrest and six-month pre-trial detention in 2017. It argued that his charitable donations had been used as the basis for bribery charges and identified his case as an example of alleged abuse of the prosecution service under the government led by Law and Justice. The contribution also called for an independent review of politically motivated criminal proceedings and greater accountability within Poland's prosecution service.

== Philanthropic activities ==
Philanthropic activities include supporting the following foundations and initiatives:

- Educational Foundation of Jan Karski,
- Media Liberation Fund,
- Gazeta Wyborcza Foundation Investigative Journalism Program,
- Stowarzyszenie Ruch Młodzieży Niezależnej (Independent Youth Movement Association),
- Open Dialogue Foundation,
- Ewangelickie Towarzystwo Oświatowe,
- Fundacja Pomocy Osobom Niepełnosprawnym,
- Fundacja Griffin ArtSpace.
- Geremek Foundation

== Awards ==
- Forbes Poland Business Leaders Ranking 2022,
- Forbes Poland Business Leaders Ranking 2016,
- Forbes Poland Business Leaders Ranking 2015,
- Lifetime achievement award by Prime Property Prize 2015,
- Personality of the Year Propertynews.pl 2014.

== Decorations ==
- July 2024 - Gold Cross of Merit (Poland) awarded for exemplary public and charity service that goes above and beyond the call of duty,
- June 2023 – Pro Patria Medal (Poland) awarded to mark special merit in strengthening and treasuring the memory of the Polish people's fight for the independence of the Polish Republic,
- June 2023 – Medal for the 40th anniversary of the Independent Youth Movement,
- November 2022 – Honorary badge of Anti-communist activist or a person repressed for political reasons,
- May 2022 – Cross of Freedom and Solidarity.

== Board memberships ==
Currently:

- Chairman: LuxVet Group.
- Member: ProService,

Past:

- Chairman: Ecowipes, Hortex, Hydroprojekt, LuxMed, Griffin Premium Real Estate, Relax Wind Parks, Cuprum Bank, Spravia.
- Deputy Chairman: Cementownia Chełm, Polimex-Mostostal.
- Member: Okechamp, Eastbridge, Bank Handlowy International, Echo Investments, Echo Polska Properties, Avenga, Bombardier Transportation (Rail Engineering), E-toto, Synergia 99
