= Maria Baliszewska =

Polish ethnomusicologist and radio journalist (1947–2026)

- Born: 10 September 1947; Sandomierz, Kielce Voivodeship, Poland
- Died: 16 November 2026 (aged 79); Warsaw, Poland
- Resting place: Powązki Cemetery, Warsaw; 52°15′07″N 20°58′22″E
- Education: University of Warsaw
- Occupations: Ethnomusicologist; Journalist
- Years active: 1973–2026
- Employer: Polskie Radio
- Known for: Founding the Radio Centre for Folk Culture
- Notable work: Muzyka źródła (folk music album series)

Maria Krystyna Baliszewska (née Polanowska; 10 September 1947 – 16 November 2026) was a Polish ethnomusicologist, journalist, and the founder of the Radio Centre for Folk Culture (Radiowe Centrum Kultury Ludowej) in 1994.

== Early life and career ==
Baliszewska was born on 10 September 1947. She was with Polish Radio from 1973, when, right after completing her studies at the University of Warsaw, earning a Master's degree in 1973, she began working in the Folk Music Department. Her passion for radio and folk culture was ignited in 1968 during an ethnographic field camp near Łęczyca. She served as the head of the Radio Centre for Folk Culture, and before that, she led the Folk Music Department beginning in 1982 (with a three-year hiatus during the period when the department was disbanded under martial law).

From 1998, Baliszewska served as the European Broadcasting Union's coordinator for traditional and folk music. On her initiative, the Polish Radio folk festival Nowa Tradycja ("New Tradition") was established in 1998, as was the Muzyka źródeł ("Music of the Sources") record series, a collection of folk music from Polish Radio, planned to span 25 albums (some of which Baliszewska herself wrote). Other projects she spearheaded include the albums Pod Tatrami ("At the Foot of the Tatras") and "Polish Folk Instruments" (part of the Ocora series), as well as "Welcome Europe" (2004), released to mark Poland's accession to the European Union. She organized two European Broadcasting Union folk festivals: one in Zakopane in 1995 and another in Gdańsk in 2005. Over the course of her career, she produced thousands of radio broadcasts focused on ethnic, traditional, and folk music, and created thousands of field, festival, and studio recordings.

She was awarded the Golden Microphone in 1993, a special award from the Culture Foundation in 1998, the Zygmunt Gloger Medal in 2003, the 2007 Minister of Culture and National Heritage Award for the promotion of culture, and the Oskar Kolberg Award (2014)..

== Death ==
Baliszewska died in Warsaw, on 16 November 2026, at the age of 79.

== Awards ==
- Knight's Cross, Order of Polonia Restituta (2011)
- Gold Cross of Merit (2005)
- Silver Cross of Merit (2000)
- Gold Gloria Artis Medal for Merit to Culture (2026)
- Silver Gloria Artis Medal for Merit to Culture (2016)
- Bronze Gloria Artis Medal for Merit to Culture (2005)
