= Klich =

Klich (Polish pronunciation: [ˈklix]) is a surname derived from the diminutive form of the given name Kliment (Clement). It may refer to:

- Bogdan Klich (born 1960), Polish politician
- Kacper Klich (born 1994), Polish swimmer
- Kent Klich (born 1952), Swedish photographer
- Mateusz Klich (born 1990), Polish footballer
- Maciej Klich (born 1958), Polish historian
