= Pro Bono Poloniae Medal =

Polish award established in 2018

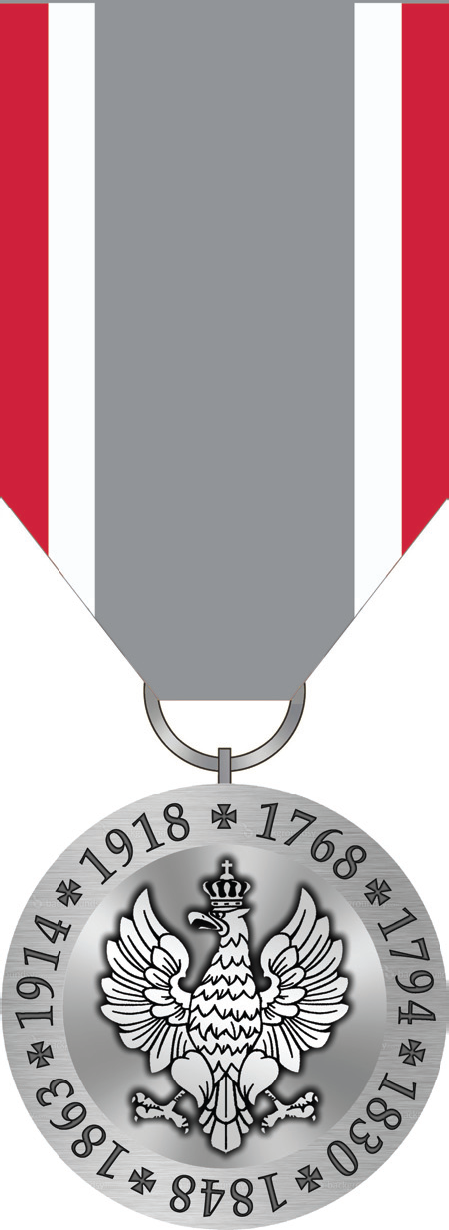
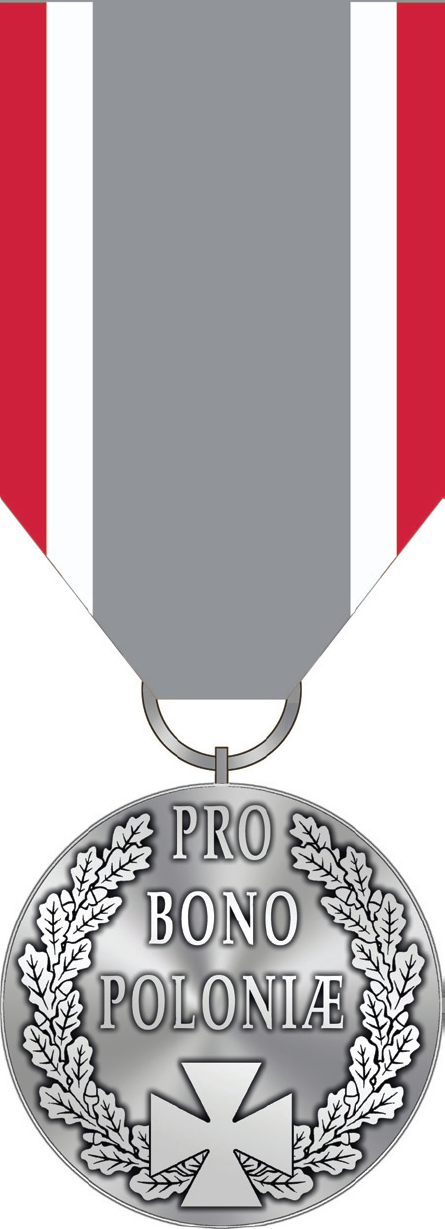
- Obverse (left) and reverse (right) of the medal
- Type: Departmental decoration
- Presented by: Office for War Veterans and Victims of Oppression
- Established: 25 June 2018
- Ribbon of the medal

The "Pro Bono Poloniae" Medal (Polish: Medal „Pro Bono Poloniae”) is a departmental decoration in Poland. The medal was established on 25 June 2018 as a commemorative medal by the Office for War Veterans and Victims of Oppression (UDSKiOR) to commemorate the centenary of Poland regaining her independence.

The "Pro Bono Poloniae" Medal is awarded to individuals and institutions that cultivate and popularise independence traditions and knowledge in Poland and abroad; whose work significantly contributes to the promotion of independence values. They disseminate knowledge about the history of independence struggles among all Poles.

== Eligibility ==
The badge is awarded by the Head of the Office for War Veterans and Victims of Oppression either on his own initiative, or at the request of nationwide veterans' organisations, provincial government and local government administration bodies, as well as heads of Polish diplomatic missions. The badge is presented personally by the Head of the Office for War Veterans and Victims of Oppression, an authorised personnel of the Office or a representative of a provincial government or local government administration body during state, patriotic, or anniversary ceremonies. The medal is worn with its ribbon on the left chest, alongside other state orders and decorations. It is worn just before the "Pro Patria" Medal.

This medal is not awarded posthumously.

== Appearance ==
The badge has the form of a metal disc with a diameter of 38 mm, textured, silver-plated and oxidized. On the obverse at the centre, there is a convex image of the White Eagle, the same adopted on the coat of arms of the Second Polish Republic and of the present day Republic of Poland. On the convex rim of the obverse, around the image of the White Eagle, there are concave years: 1768, 1794, 1830, 1848, 1863, 1914 and 1918, separated by concave crosses modelled on the cross pattées. The years symbolise the most important independence uprisings of Polish society, starting from the Bar Confederation, up to the Polish Legions in 1914 and the following Polish political and military actions, and Poland regaining statehood in 1918.

On the reverse from the top there is a centrally placed inscription in three lines in convex capital letters: PRO BONO POLONIÆ, meaning "FOR THE GOOD OF POLAND". The inscription is surrounded in a horseshoe shape with an oak wreath opening upwards, symoblising glory, victory, and the virtues of courage, endurance, strength, and power. Centrally below the inscription, the lower part of the oak wreath is covered by a convex cross pattées, which is the symbol of the Polish Armed Forces.

The medal is suspended on a 38 mm wide, dark grey grosgrain ribbon with symmetrically connected silver and dark crimson stripes on the edges, each 4 mm wide. The dark gray colour of the ribbon refers to the colour of the infantry uniform, the most numerous Polish armed formation in 1918.
