= Golden Microphone =

Golden Microphone may refer to:

- Golden Microphone (China)
- Golden Microphone (Mongolia)
- Golden Microphone, award of the Nepal Idol, a Nepalese reality television singing competition
- Golden Microphone (Poland), Polish award for radio personalities
- Golden Microphone (Turkey), Turkish music contest
- Golden Mike Award, American award by the Radio and Television News Association (RTNA) of Southern California for broadcast journalism
- "Golden Microphone", a track on the album Diamond Jubilee by Canadian band Cindy Lee
- Kuldmikrofon, annual award for broadcast journalism presented by the Estonian Broadcasting Union
- Premios Micrófono de Oro, by the Federation of Radio and Television Associations, Spain
- Zelta Mikrofons, annual award for the best Latvian musicians

== See also ==
- Audie Awards
