= Badge of Honor to the Meritorious to Transportation of the Republic of Poland =

Departmental decoration

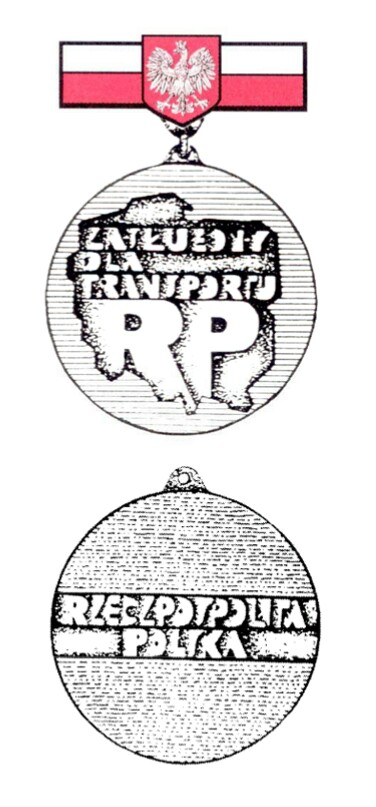
- Both sides of the badge.

Awarded by Minister of Infrastructure of Poland
- Type: Departmental decoration
- Established: 22 November 2000
- Country: Poland
- Awarded for: particular contribution to the achievements and development of this area of the national economy
- Status: Continuously awarded

Precedence
- Related: Badge For Merit to Transportation of the Polish People's Republic

The Badge of Honor to the Meritorious to Transportation of the Republic of Poland (Polish: Odznaka honorowa „Zasłużony dla transportu Rzeczypospolitej Polskiej”) is a departmental decoration awarded by the Minister of Infrastructure of Poland as an honorary distinction intended for the transport workers who have made a particular contribution to the achievements and development of this area of the national economy. It was established on 22 November 2000 by the Council of Ministers

== History ==
The Badge of Honor to the Meritorious to Transportation of the Republic of Poland was established on 22 November 2000 by the Council of Ministers. It is a departmental decoration awarded by the Minister of Infrastructure of Poland as an honorary distinction intended for the transport workers who have made a particular contribution to the achievements and development of this area of the national economy. The award is a successor to the Badge For Merit to Transportation of the Polish People's Republic, issued from 1976 to 1996.

== Description ==
The badge has a form a circular medal measuring 32 mm (1.26 in) in diameter. The badge is made of silver metal, featuring and engraving of the outline of the territory of Poland in the center, along with the inscription "Zasłużony dla transportu RP" (Meritorious to Transportation of the Republic of Poland). The reverse bears the inscription "Rzeczpospolita Polska" (Republic of Poland). Both inscriptions are written with capital letters. The medal is suspended on a rectangular pendant measuring 32 × 8 mm (1.26 × 0.31 in), covered half with white, and half with red enamel. In the center of the pendant, on a red enamel shield, is placed a silver eagle, based on the design specified in the regulations on the coat of arms of Poland.
