= Maciej Klich =

Polish historian (born 1958)

Maciej Klich Mattias Jan-Maria Klich
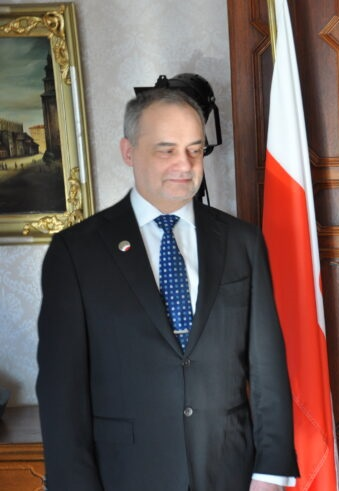
- Klich in 2023
- Born: 28 February 1958 (age 68); Krakow, Poland
- Education: University of Silesia
- Occupations: Historian, Graphics artist, Polish anti-communist Independence activitst during the Dissident movement in the People's Republic of Poland
- Years active: 1976-1989
- Known for: Anti-communist activism
- Notable work: "Niepokorny, historia lat 1976-1989"
- Children: 3
- Parents: Antoni Stanislaw (father); Olga Wiktoria (mother)
- Relatives: Bogdan Klich (cousin)

Maciej Klich (Mattias Jan-Maria) [ˈmat͡ɕɛj klʲix'] (born 28 February 1958) is a Polish historian, graphic artist, and former anti-communist Polish independence activist. In 1980, Klich co-founded the Independent Students' Association (Polish: Niezależne Zrzeszenie Studentów, NZS) in Silesia. Klich was interned on 24 December 1981, during the martial law set by the communist regime in Poland. In internment camps, Klich created 70+ stamps for the so-called "camp mail". Klich was released on 23 July 1982. After his release, Klich participated in the underground Solidarity, and the underground Independent Students' Association.

In 1984, Klich had to forcefully immigrate to Stockholm, Sweden, due to a "forced migration" set by the communist regime in Poland. He was then banned from entering Poland from 1984 until the regime's fall in 1989. After immigrating to Sweden, Klich would help Lithuanian children in international summer camps and would sponsor International Scout Integration Camps from 1992 to 2001.

== Personal life ==
=== Family ===
Maciej Klich is the son of Antoni Stanislaw and Olga Wiktoria, from the Ozga family. He also has a younger sister.

Klich's father, Antoni Stanislaw Klich, graduated from the Department of Metallurgy at the AGH University of Science and Technology. In 1964, Antoni became chief engineer of the unification of mining and steeling of non-ferrous metals in Katowice. In his 70's & 80's, Antoni was a general mining director, and was also director over the department of mining & construction in Katowice. Antoni would later begin building a self-built house, which the family would eventually move into in 1976. From 1980, Antoni would support "Solidarity", but couldn't enroll with a big influence due to ageing. In his 90's, Antoni was distinguished for his support of Solidarity. Antoni Stanislaw Klich died in 2011.

Klich's mother, Olga Wiktoria, graduated from the department of pedagogical and teaching studies at the higher school of social sciences in Kraków. For health reasons, Olga was never able to have a professional career in her field.

Maciej Klich is Adam Klich's nephew and Bogdan's cousin.

Klich is a father to Mattias Jr., Matteus, and William. Since 1984, Klich has resided in Stockholm.

=== Early life ===
Maciej Klich was born on 28 February 1958, in Kraków. Klich moved to Częstochowa in his early childhood due to his father changing jobs. Later, in 1964, Klich moved to Katowice. Klich also took part in scouting throughout his childhood.

=== Early Adulthood ===
In 1976, Klich graduated High School nr. 1. Nicolaus Copernicus in Katowice. For his school-leaving exam in 1976, he wrote a genesis about the fall of fascism in Italy. The genesis would be distinguished as one of the best exam projects in Silesia in 1976. From 1976 to 1977, he studied at the Department of Metallurgy at the AGH University of Science and Technology in Kraków. Klich later switched majors, and began studying Social Sciences at the University of Silesia in Katowice between the years 1977 and 1981. After graduating from the University of Silesia, he began to study architecture at the Silesian University of Technology from 1981 to 1984.

== Dissident activity ==
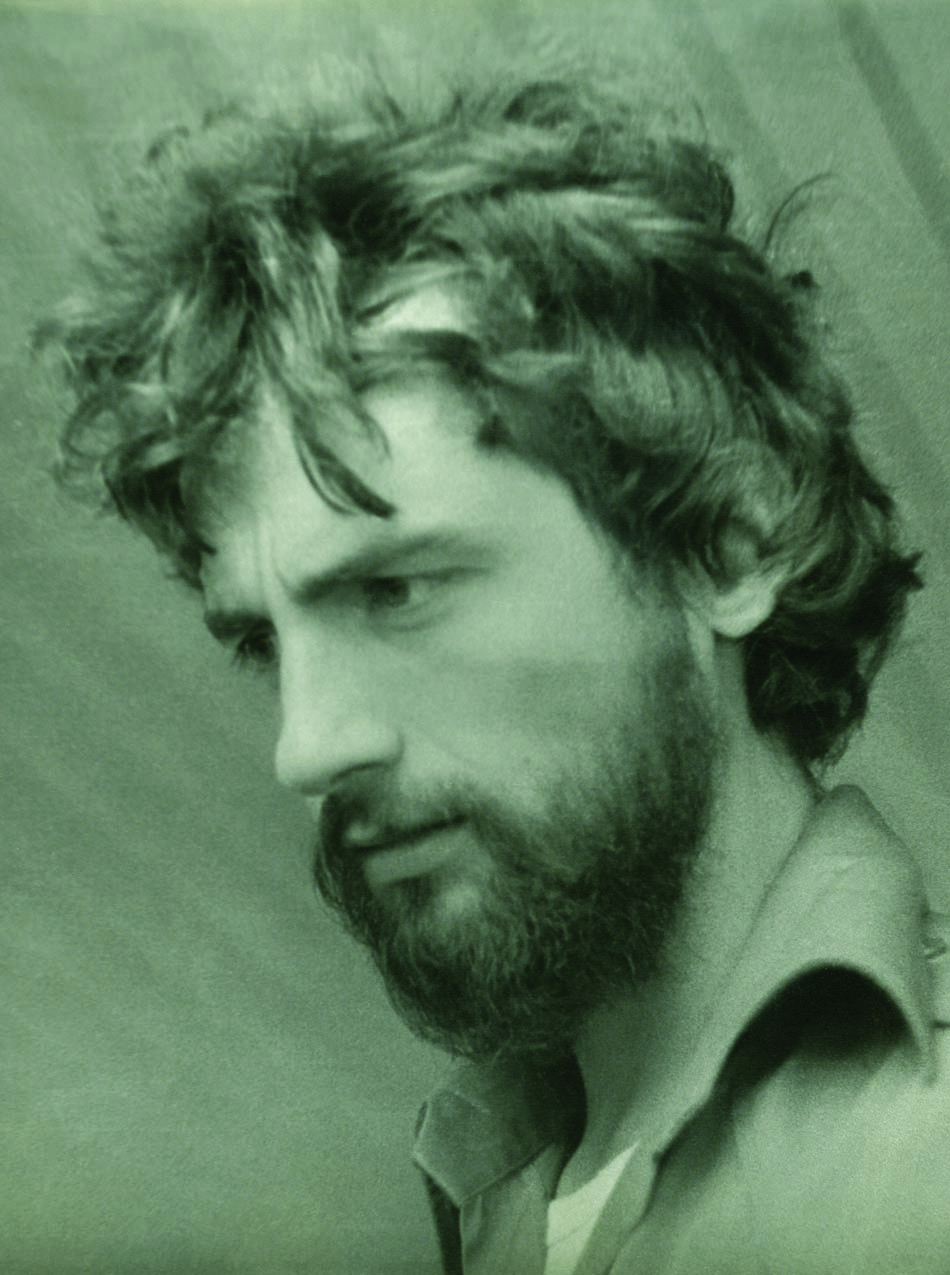
Klich in 1981

In the Polish People's Republic Klich was actively cooperating with the Movement for Defense of Human and Civic Rights in Kraków (1977–1988). In 1980, Klich was one of the co-founders to the Independent Students' Association (Polish: Niezależne Zrzeszenie Studentów, NZS) in Silesia.

From 1980 to 1981, Klich was the secretary of the Regional Coordination Committee (Polish: Regionalny Komitet Koordynacyjny NZS, RKK NZS) of the NZS University of Upper Silesia and the Inter-faculty Coordination Committee (Polish: Międzywydziałowy Komitet Koordynacyjny NZS, MKK NZS) of the NZS University of Silesia.

In 1981, he became the chairman of the University Audit Committee of the NZS University of Silesia and the Departmental Audit Committee (Polish: Wydziałowa Komisja Rewizyjna, WKR) of the Department of Social Sciences at the University of Silesia. Klich co-founded the Intercollegiate Committee for the Defense of Prisoners' Beliefs in Silesia (Polish: Międzyuczelniany Komitet Obrony Więzionych za Przekonania, KOWzaP) in 1981. From 1981, he was a member of the Confederation of Independent Poland (Polish: Konfederacja Polski Niepodległej, KPN).

He was interned from 24 December 1981, to 23 July 1982, after martial law was imposed in Poland on 12 December 1981. He made about 70 stamps in the internment camps as part of the so-called camp mail. He was active in underground solidarity, including being a part of the structures of the Municipal Resistance Committees (Polish: Miejskie Komitety Oporu, MKO).

He distributed and was the editor of the underground press and the radio station "Solidarność". He also participated in the underground structures of the NZS. In the years 1980–84, Klich created graphic forms for the use of trade union and pro-independence organizations from Upper Silesia (including posters, leaflets, signs, illustrations for magazines, and stamps).

The stamps and camp stamps that Klich had created, among other things, were distributed at shows: In Chicago 1983; Stockholm 1986; "Poza cenzurą – Mail of the internees 1981–1982, Zabrze 1990"; In Ratingen (Germany), 2001; Jastrzebie Zdroj – display "Miasto pod specjalnym nadzorem: Jastrzębie Zdrój czasu stanu wojennego", 2006/2007; Jasło 2008 and Rapperswil 2009.

== Emigration to Sweden ==
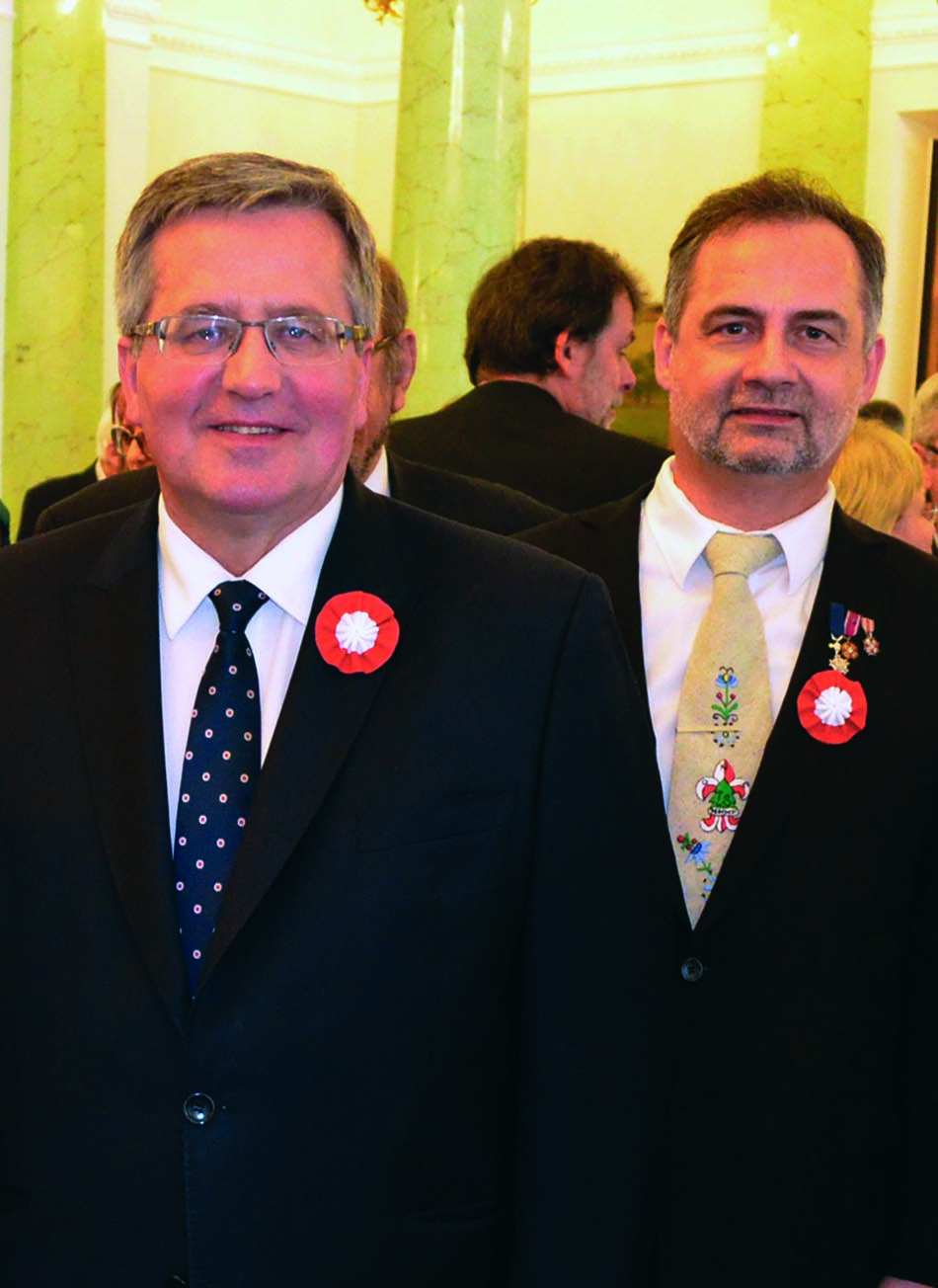
Maciej Klich with Polish President Bronisław Komorowski on May 3, 2013.

In 1984, Klich was forced to leave Poland to emigrate to Sweden. He was awaiting trial and faced up to six years in jail for anti-communist activity. The Polish government gave Klich the opportunity to leave Poland and migrate to Sweden. Klich fled to Sweden, and was banned from entering Poland until the regime's fall in 1989. From 1985 to 1989, Klich was an organizer of support for NZS and Solidarity members who were being oppressed in Upper Silesia during the Polish martial law as part of the so-called "Składka Górnośląska". From 1986 to 1994, Klich facilitated the transport of medical equipment as part of "medical aid" to Poland. Klich was involved in the transportation and distribution of publications and books that were prohibited in Poland from 1986 to 1989.

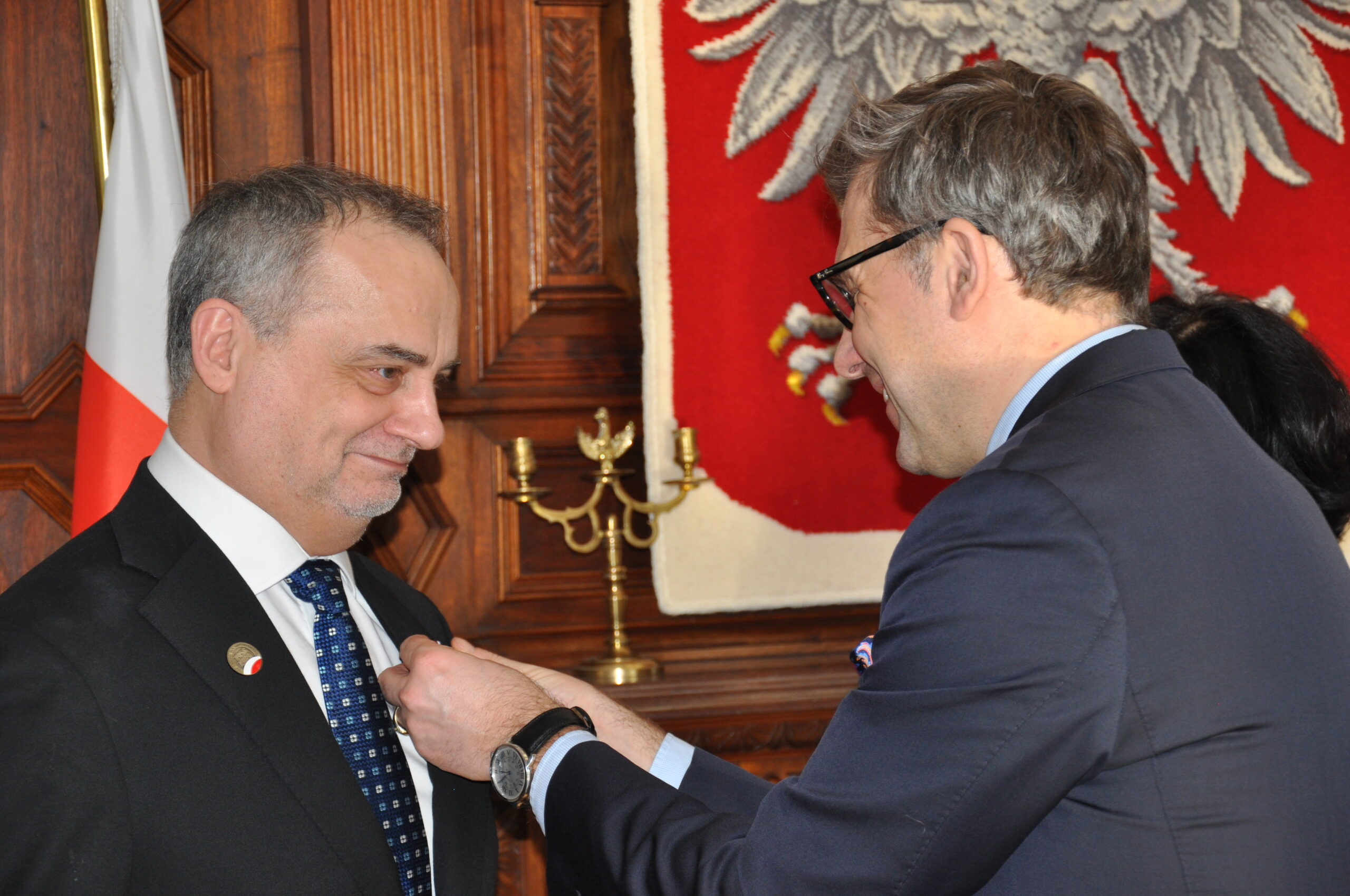
Maciej Klich receiving the Pro Patria award in 2021.

In 1986, Klich was one of the founders of the "Polish Scouting Association Outside Borders - Sweden District"(Polish: Związek Harcerstwa Polskiego poza granicami Kraju, ZHPpzK). In 1991 Klich co-founded and an advised the Independent Polish Scouting Squad "LS-Kaszuby" (IPSS) in Sweden (Polish: Niezależny Hufiec Harcerstwa Polskiego "LS-Kaszuby" w Szwecji, NHHP “LS-Kaszuby w Szwecji”) and its sponsor (since 1991). Author of the IPSS's statute, advisor and member of the IPSS Council. From 1991 to 2014, he was the secretary of the IPSS. He is the author of all the symbols, graphic signs, banner and brochures for IPSS.

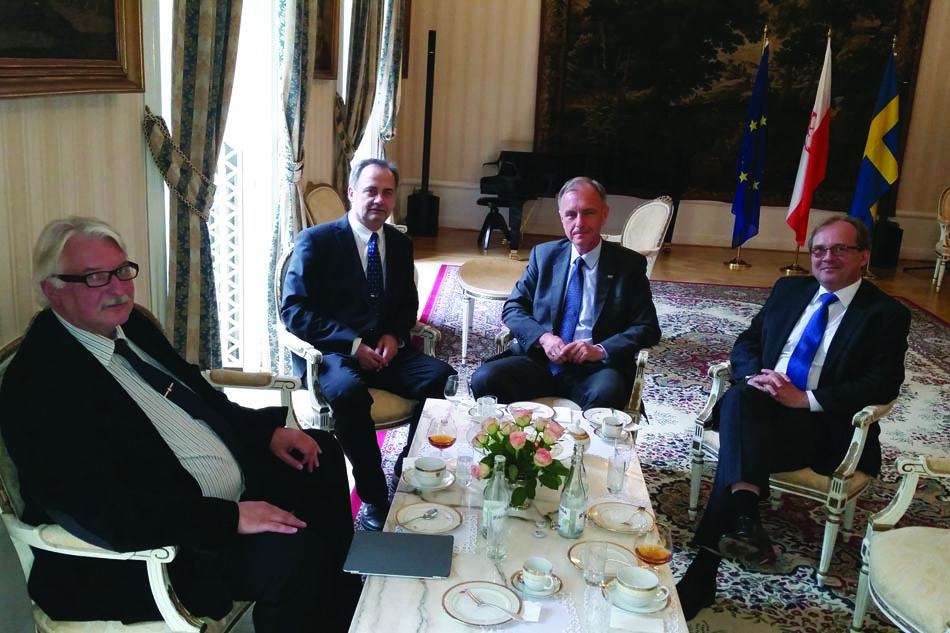
Meeting in the Polish Embassy in Stockholm, from left: Polish senator Witold Waszczykowski, Maciej Klich, Polish senator Bogdan Klich, and former Polish ambassador to Sweden Adam Hałaciński.

In the years 1995–1998, he organized and sponsored the Christmas drawing competitions in Poland. In the years 1994–1998, Klich provided assistance in helping Polish children from Lithuania at the IPSS International Summer Camps. From 1997 to 1999, he supported the Concerts of Classical Music "Dzieci-Dzieciom", and from 2000 to 2014, he was the official sponsor of the Concerts. Klich supported and sponsored the International Scout Integration Camps in the years 1992–2001.

In the years 1990–96, he was an associate of the Swedish-Polish Environmental Association (Swedish: Svensk-Polska Miljöförening) and a graphic editor of "The Environmental Connection" (Swedish: Miljösambandet) magazine.

In the years 1990–96, he was an associate of the Swedish-Polish Environmental Association (Swedish: Svensk-Polska Miljöförening) and a graphic editor of "Miljösambandet" magazine.

Klich sponsored many Polish diaspora initiatives in Stockholm, including the construction of the Katyn Monument.

He is a member of the Association of the Repressed in Martial Law (Polish: Stowarzyszenia Represjonowanych w Stanie Wojennym). Klich has also been recognized by the Institute of National Remembrance for being a victim and repressed during the Polish People's Republic and for being investigated by the security services of the People's Republic of Poland from 1980 to 1983.

== Badges ==
- 2000 - Silver Merit Cross, for scouting activity
- 2005 - Golden Merit Cross, for overall social activity
- 2011 - Knight's Cross of the Order of Merit of the Republic of Poland
- 2016 - the cross of Freedom and Solidarity
- 2018 - Honorary badge of Anti-communist activist or a person repressed for political reasons
- 2020 - Medal "Pro Patria" for extraordinary contributions in maintaining the historical memory of the Republic of Poland.
- 2022 - Medal of the Centenary of Regained Independence for exceptional contributions to the state and society.

== Awards ==
- 2019 - "Nagroda Specjalna", awarded by "Nową Gazetę Polską" in Stockholm

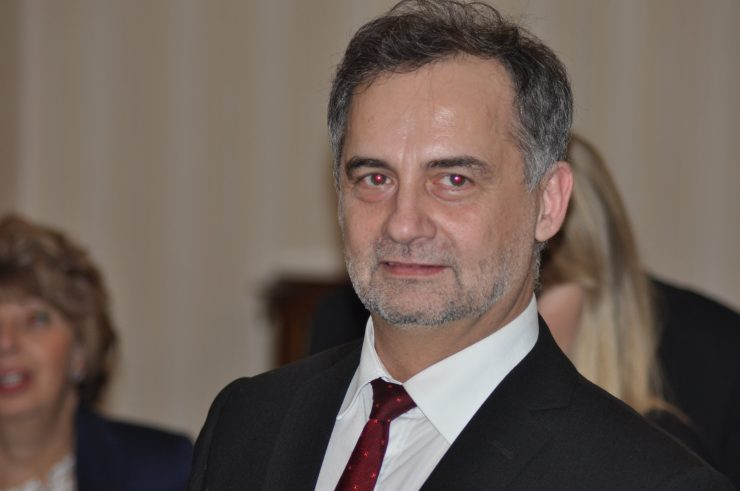
Maciej Klich in 2019

== Books ==
- 2018 - "Niepokorny, Historia lat 1976–1989", Instytut Pamięci Narodowej (Polish Institute of National Remembrance (IPN)), Warsaw-Katowice 2018.
- 2021 - "Upadła nadzieja, Geneza stanu wojennego z 13 grudnia 1981 roku", "Wydawnictwo Polonica", Stockholm 2021.
- 2022 - "Stracone złudzenia, Wspomnienie strajku studenckiego na Wydziale Nauk Społecznych Uniwersytetu Śląskiego w Katowicach w listopadzie i grudniu 1981 roku", "Instytut Pamięci Narodowej", Katowice 2021

== Publicity ==
- 2018 – "Refleksje o współczesnej Polsce", Nowa Gazeta Polska, Stockholm No. 2, 28 January 2018 (part 1), No. 3 11 February 2018 (part 2), No. 4 25 February 2018 (part 3) (NGP, ISSN 1103-3339),
- 2021 – "Stan wojenny, 13 grudnia 1989, geneza", Nowa Gazeta Polska, Stockholm No. 18, 10 October 2021 (part 1), No. 21 21 November 2021 (part 2), No. 22 12 May 2021 (part 3) (NGP, ISSN 1103-3339),
- 2022 – "Studenci 1981. Wspomnienie o strajku studenckim na Wydziale Nauk Społecznych Uniwersytetu Śląskiego i wprowadzeniu stanu wojennego", "CzasyPismo" No. 2 ( / 2021, "CzasyPismo o historii Górnego Śląska" 2(20)/2021"
- 2022 - "Leon Neuger - Komemoracja" in "Gry międzyludzkie Leona Neugera" edited by Aleksander Fiut, Elżbieta Jogałła i Elżbieta Tabakowska, publishing house "Austeria", Kraków-Budapest-Syracuse 2022 (pages 169–184), ISBN 978-83-7866-446-8.

== Interviews ==
- 2006 – Dana Platter – "Maćka Klicha przygoda z opozycją", Stockholm No. 12-2006 (Relations, ISSN 1100-4487),
- 2019 – Tadeusz Nowakowski – "To co łączyło nas kiedyś, łączy nas i dzisiaj". "Nowa Gazeta Polska", Stockholm No. 14, 18 August 2019 (NGP, ISSN 1103-3339),

== Business work ==
- 1988–2021 – advertising and graphic company "MJK Grafik Reklam" (managing director),
- 1998–2012 – technological and computer-themed firm "EMICO Computers" (Business Owner),
- 2010–2024 – Consular Section of the Embassy of the Republic of Poland in Stockholm.

== Biograms ==
- 2013 - "Leksykon emigracji polskiej w Szwecji, do 2012 roku", written by Tadeusz Nowakowski, publishing house "Polonica", Stockholm 2013, ISBN 978-91-87704-72-7
- 2021 - "Precz z komuną, Niezależne Zrzeszenie Studentów w województwie katowickim w latach 1980-1990", authors: Przemysław Miśkiewicz, Łukasz Kobiela, "Stowarzyszenie Pokolenie" and Museum of Silesia 2021, ISBN 978-83-63711-18-4
- 2023 - "Encyklopedia Solidarności. Tom 5. Opozycja w PRL 1976-1989", Instytut Pamieci Narodowej 2023, ISBN 978-83-8229-894-9
- 2024 - Biography on the website: https://encysol.pl/es/encyklopedia/biogramy/42721,Klich-Maciej.html (Access: 04.01.2024)

== See also ==
Dissident Movement in the Polish People's Republic

Independent Students' Association

Solidarity

Polish People's Republic

Communism
