= Afanasij Poliszczuk =

Ukrainian Soviet military officer, Polish Army officer and veterinarian

Anafasij Poliszczuk
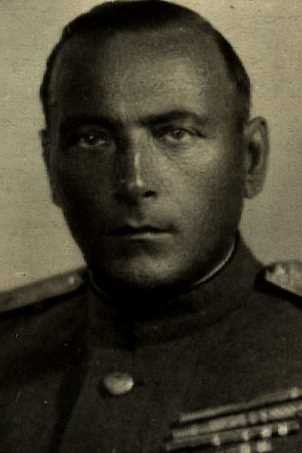
- Born: 19 May 1895; Hulaki Wielkie, Russian Empire
- Died: 23 March 1976 (aged 80); Kyiv, USSR
- Military career
- Allegiance: USSR; Polish People's Republic
- Branch: Red Army; Polish People's Army
- Service years: 1918-1948
- Rank: Generał brygady (Brigadier general)
- Units: First Polish Army; Ministry of National Defence
- Commands: Head of the veterinary service of the 1st Polish Army
- Conflicts: Second World War
- Awards
- Other work: veterinarian

Afanasij Poliszczuk (born 28 April 1903, date of death unknown) was a Ukrainian Soviet military officer, Brigadier General of the Polish Army and a veterinarian. He came from Ukraine. He ended four-year veterinary school and five-year studies at Institute of Veterinary. He was the officer of Red Army, took the part in Second World War, in August 1943 was sent to military service in Polish Army, since 1944 he was the chief of veterinary service in First Polish Army. After war he served in Ministry of National Defence. In the years 1945-1946 has extramurally studied at Warsaw University. On May 7, 1946 he was promoted by the presidium of State National Council to the rank of Brigadier general of Polish People's Army. In 1948 he ended his service in Poland and returned to USSR.

== Decorations ==
- Order of the Cross of Grunwald, 3rd Class (1945)
- Officer's Cross of Order of Polonia Restituta (1945)
- Gold Cross of Merit (1946)
- Silver Cross of Merit (1945)
- Silver Medal "For Merit on the Field of Glory" (1946)

== Bibliography ==
- Henryk P. Kosk, Generalicja polska t. II, Pruszków 2001
- Janusz Królikowski, Generałowie Wojska Polskiego 1943-1990 t. III: M-S, Toruń 2010, s. 208.
