= Jerzy Troszczynski =

Polish photographer and actor

- Born: 1932
- Died: 1977 (aged 44–45)
- Occupation: Photographer
- Years active: 1957–1970s
- Known for: Movie photography

Jerzy Troszczynski (1932–1977) was a Polish photographer and actor who specialised in movie photography.

His photographs are held in the National Library of Poland and the National Film Archive, Poland.

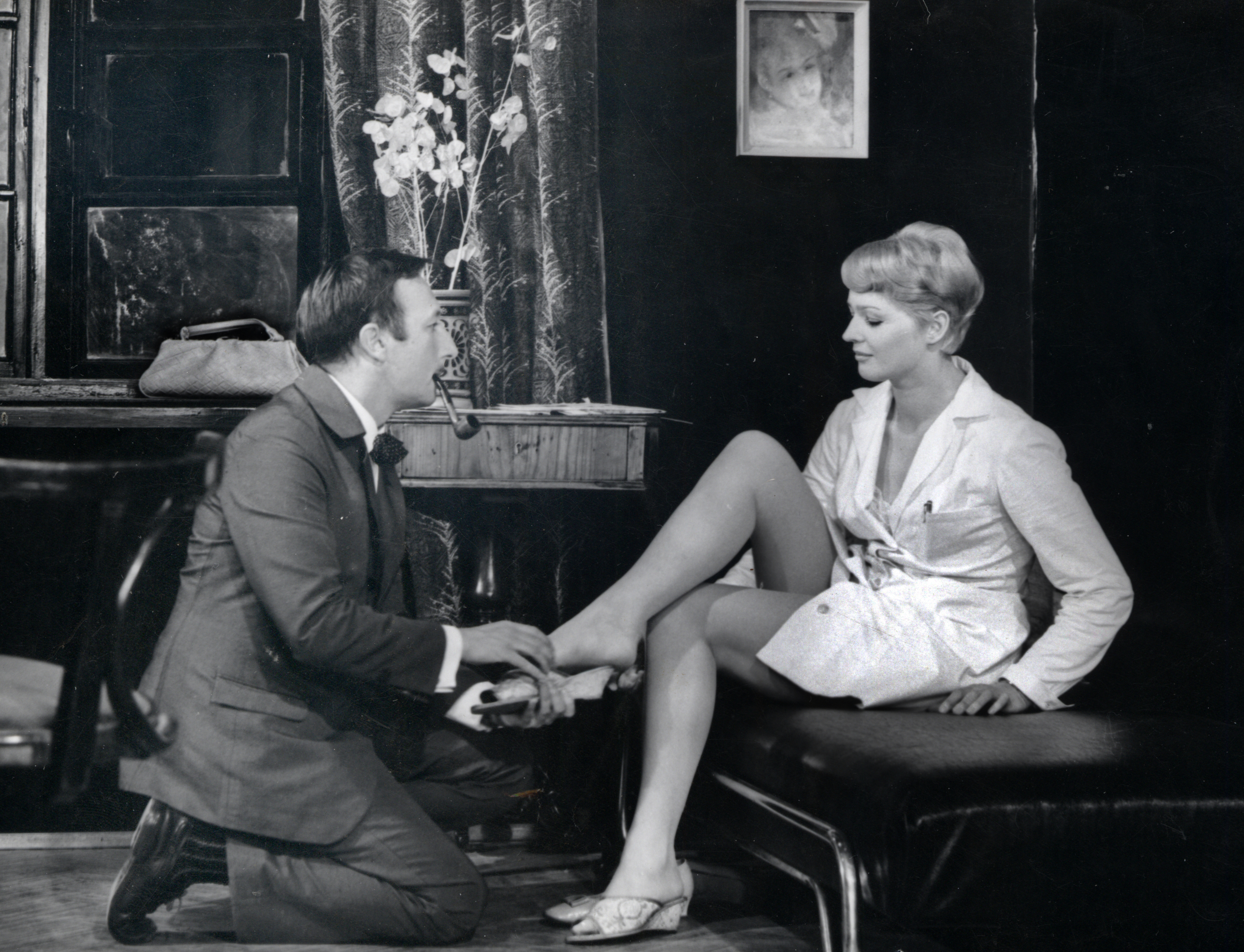
An example of one of Troszczynski's photographs: Barbara Modelska and Bogumił Kobiela from Czlowiek z M-3 (1968).

He photographed numerous people involved with Polish cinema including Wieslaw Zdort, Wieńczysław Gliński, Ignacy Machowski, Bronislaw Pawlik, Sylwester Chęciński, Andrzej Kondratiuk, and Daniel Olbrychski.

His photographs appeared in magazines such as Ekran, and Film, and have appeared in exhibitions like The Wild West: A History of Wroclaw’s Avant-Garde (2015)

Troszczynski was awarded the Silver Cross of Merit.
