= Alojzy Nowak =

Polish economist

Alojzy Zbigniew Nowak
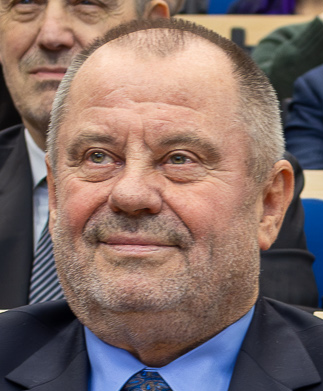
- Alojzy Zbigniew Nowak (2024)
- Born: March 20, 1956 (age 70); Poland
- Education: SGH Warsaw School of Economics (BS, AM); University of Warsaw (PhD, tenure)
- Alma mater: University of Warsaw
- Occupation: Rector of the University of Warsaw
- Years active: 1984–present
- Title: Rector of the University of Warsaw
- Term: 2020–2024
- Predecessor: Marcin Pałys
- Board member of: Powszechny Zakład Ubezpieczeń (2017–2020)
- Website: https://alojzynowak.pl/

Alojzy Zbigniew Nowak (born 20 March 1956) is a Polish economist. In 2020, he was elected Rector of the University of Warsaw.

== Life and education ==
In 1984, he graduated with a master's degree from the SGH Warsaw School of Economics. In 1991 he earned his PhD in economic sciences at the University of Warsaw. He received tenure in economic sciences in 1995, at the same university. Between 1996 and 2002, he held a position of an associate professor. By the decision of President of Poland he received professor degree in 2002. He served two terms as a dean of the Faculty of Management of the University of Warsaw (2006–2012 and 2016–2020). In the year 2012–2016 he served as prorector at the University of Warsaw.

He also worked as an associate professor at University of Illinois at Urbana–Champaign, Exeter University and Free University of Berlin.

In 2015, he was named a member of Andrzej Duda's presidential think-tank National Development Council. Between 2017 and 2020 he was a member and the secretary of the board of the Powszechny Zakład Ubezpieczeń. Since 2017 he is a chairman of the Board of the University Sports Association of Poland, the biggest student association in Poland.

On 17 June 2020 he was elected Rector of the University of Warsaw.

== Honors ==
- 2002: Golden Cross of Merit
