= Meritorious Activist of Culture =

Polish honorary badge in Arts

- Native name: Zasłużony Działacz Kultury
- Country: Poland
- Established: March 6, 1962

The honorary badge Meritorious Activist of Culture (Polish: Zasłużony Działacz Kultury) was a departmental decoration of Poland in Arts awarded by the Ministry of Culture and National Heritage of the Republic of Poland to persons and organizations for distinguished contributions to, or protection and propagation of the Polish culture.

Established in 1962, it was superseded by the Medal for Merit to Culture – Gloria Artis in 2005 as part of the general reform in management of culture and education.
