= Anna Stupnicka-Bando =

Polish Righteous Among the Nations Anna Stupnicka-Bando
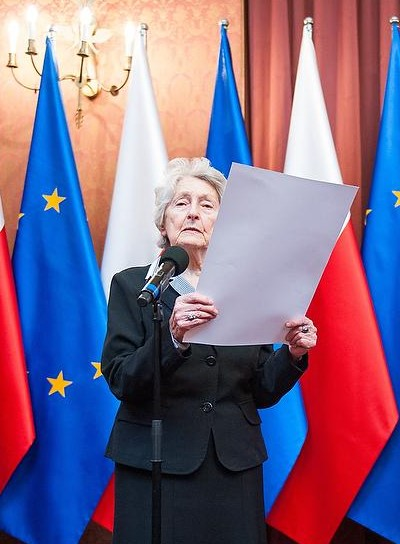
- Born: February 23, 1929 (age 97); Polish
- Education: Medical University of Warsaw
- Occupation: Neurologist
- Employer: Central Railway Hospital in Międzylesie
- Organization: President of the Polish Society of the Righteous Among the Nations
- Known for: Righteous Among the Nations
- Parent: Janina Stupnicka
- Awards: Commander of the Order of Polonia Restituta (2008) Righteous Among the Nations (1983) Pro Patria Medal (2017)

Anna Stupnicka-Bando, born Anna Bożenna Bando, (born February 23, 1929, in Końskie ) is a Polish doctor, and since 2014 president of the Polish Society of the Righteous Among the Nations .

== History ==
Anna Stupnicka-Bando's father was the starost of Końskie before the war. Her mother, Janina Stupnicka née Wójcik, worked as a teacher. After splitting up with her husband, she worked in the military administration. Before the war, Anna Stupnicka lived with her mother and grandmother on ul. Mickiewicza 25 in Warsaw's Żoliborz. She attended the school of the Sisters of Resurrection.

In September 1939, the family was evacuated from Warsaw. After reaching the Romanian border, Janina, influenced by her mother, decided to return to the occupied capital. She was responsible for keeping registration books and building administration. Thanks to a pass that allowed people to move around the ghetto, in the winter of 1941, together with Anna, she took a Jewish girl - Liliana Alter, daughter of Hilary, a Bund activist, from there; Liliana's mother died during the war. Until the outbreak of the Warsaw Uprising, Liliana, introducing herself as Krysia Wójcik, was hiding with the Stupnicki family. The girls took part in secret teaching. Other Jews in hiding also came to the apartment in Żoliborz: Ryszard Grynberg and Mikołaj Borenstein. Borenstein was helped by Janina Kennkarte and work in the neighboring building. After the uprising broke out, the women stayed in the basement of the house. Anna Stupnicka, as a nurse, organized a medical point of the District II "Żywiciel" of the Home Army. After the uprising, the women were sent to a transit camp in Pruszków.

From there they were directed by the Germans to Kraków. They managed to escape during the deportation. In early spring 1945, they came to Warsaw. Immediately after the war, the Stupnicki family moved to Gdańsk . Anna was active in the Society of the Friends of the Soldier. They returned to Warsaw. In 1954 their house in Międzylesie burned down. Anna began her studies at the Medical Academy in Warsaw. After some time, she stopped to help her sick mother. She earned extra money by running a traffic kiosk. They lived with a neighbor. Anna Stupnicka then married an engineer, an employee of the Electrotechnical Institute in Międzylesie. She graduated from the university with a specialization in neurology. Throughout her life, professionally associated with the Central Railway Hospital. She also ran a neurological clinic.

She was active in the "Wawer" veterans' circle, for some time being a member of the board. She ran an office for veterans. At the Polish Society of the Righteous Among the Nations, she was initially on the board, and in 2014 became its president. As a representative of the Righteous, in 2009 she participated in a visit to the United States, during which she met with President Barack Obama.

All three Jews survived the war. Anna Stupnicka was in contact with Grynberg until the 1970s. Liliana Alter (after her husband Ridler) left for her aunt in France after the war; in 1989 she renewed contact with Anna, the women met in Paris.

In 1983, Anna Stupnicka-Bando and her mother were awarded the medals of the Righteous Among the Nations. In 2008 she was awarded the Commander's Cross of the Order of Polonia Restituta, and in 2017 the "Pro Patria" Medal. In 2019, President Andrzej Duda sent her wishes on the occasion of the 90th anniversary of her birth.
