= Bene Merito honorary distinction =

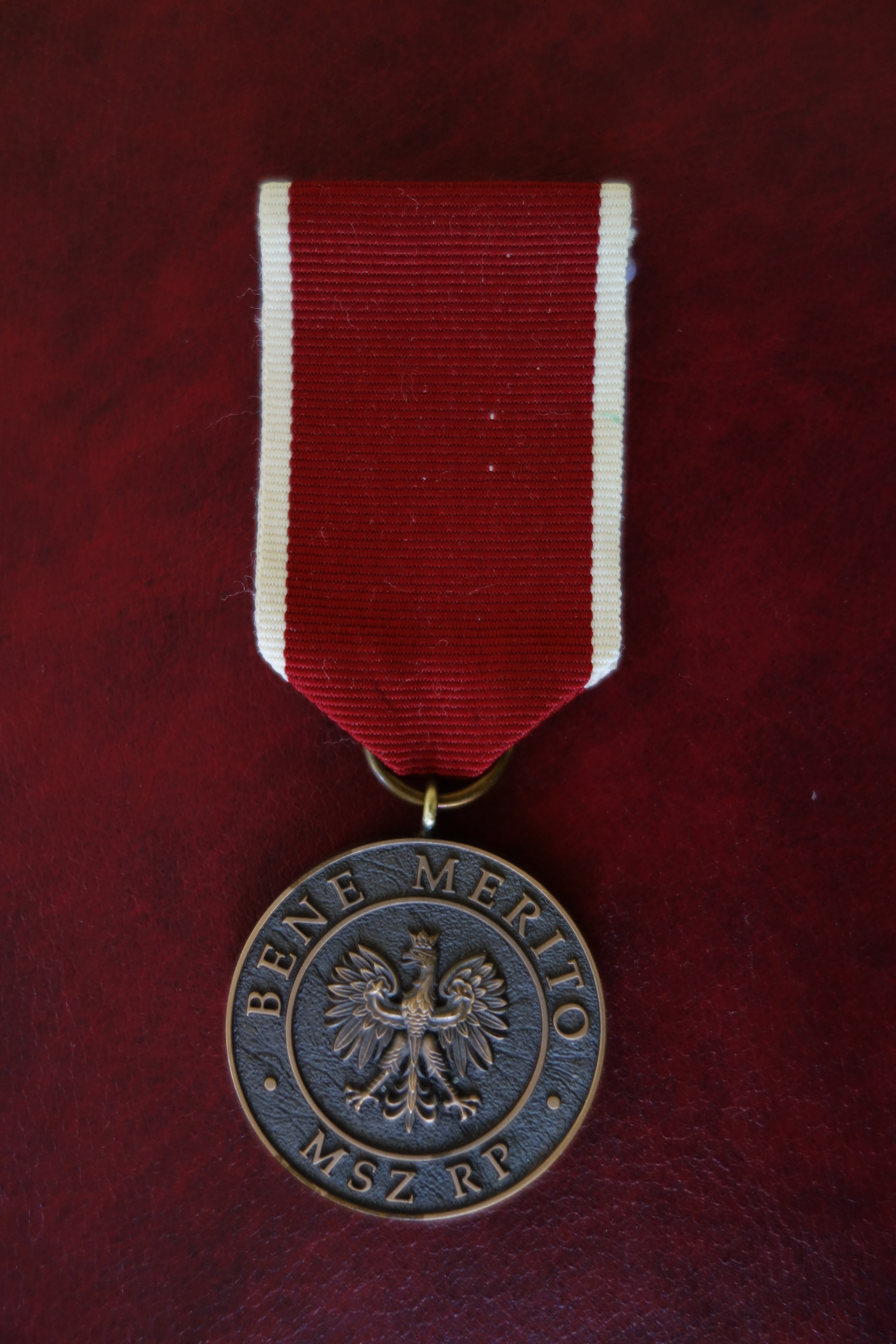
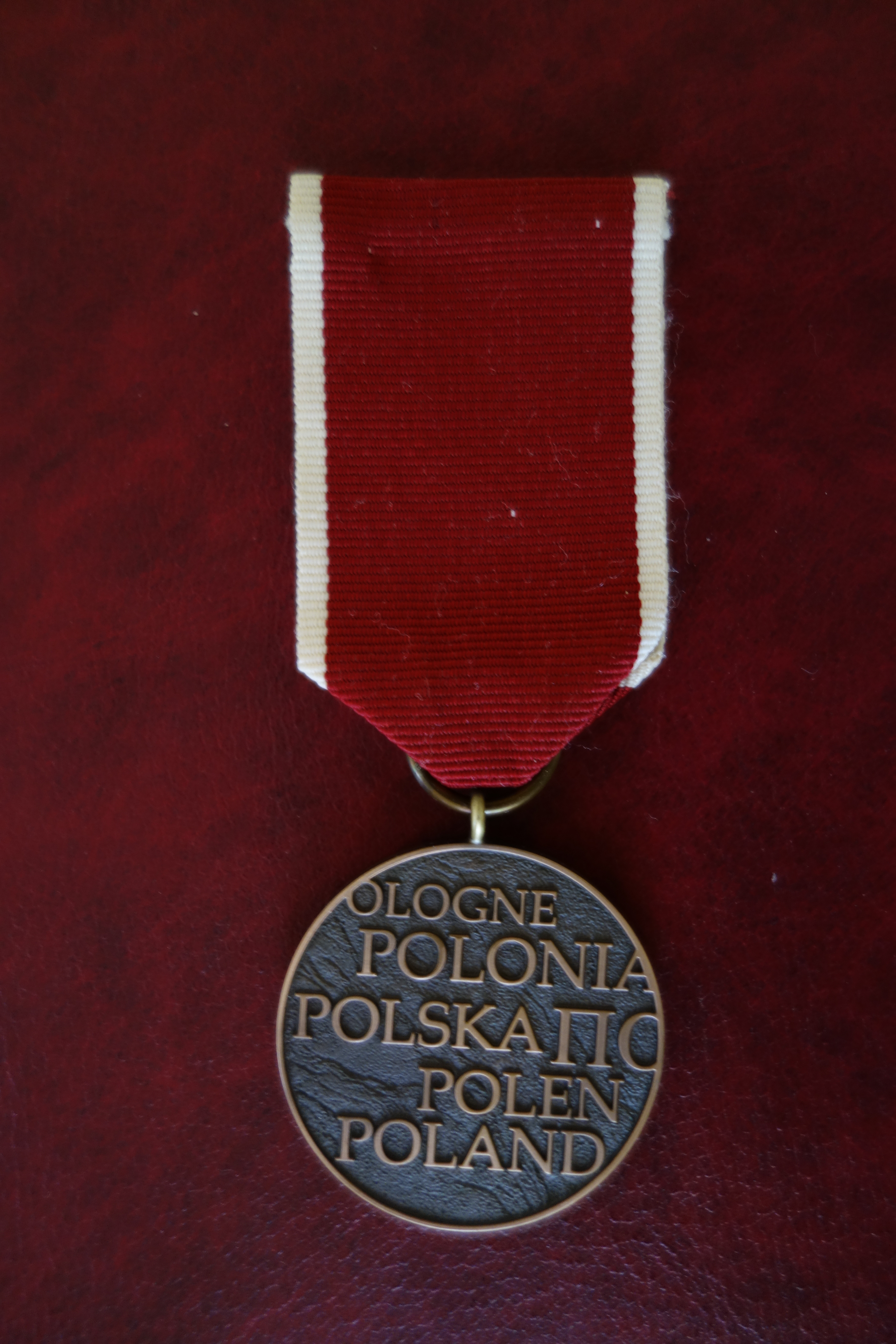
- Obverse (left) and reverse (right) of the medal
- Type: Departmental decoration
- Awarded for: Merits in promoting Poland abroad
- Presented by: Minister of Foreign Affairs of Poland
- Established: 2009
- Ribbon of the medal

The Bene Merito honorary distinction (Polish: Odznaka Honorowa „Bene Merito”; Latin for "well-merited" or "worthy") is a departmental (ministerial) decoration of Poland.

The Minister of Foreign Affairs of Poland awards the citizens of Poland and foreign nationals with this decoration "in recognition of their merits in promoting Poland abroad."

It was established in 2009 by the then Minister of Foreign Affairs Radosław Sikorski.
