= Decoration of Honor Meritorious for Polish Culture =

Polish award

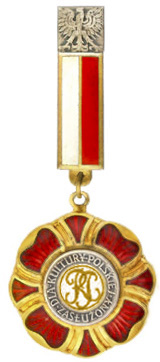
Meritorious for Polish Culture

The Decoration of Honor Meritorious for Polish Culture (Polish: Odznaka Honorowa "Zasłużony dla Kultury Polskiej") or Meritorious for Polish Culture, is a Polish departmental decoration in Arts awarded by the Ministry of Culture and National Heritage of the Republic of Poland to persons and organizations for distinguished contributions to the Polish culture and heritage. This award was instituted on 11 August 1969.

== See also ==
- Gloria Artis
- Orders, decorations, and medals of Poland
