= Tomasz Miśkiewicz =

Polish mufti

Personal details
- Born: 9 July 1977 (age 49) Białystok, Poland

Tomasz Miśkiewicz (born 9 July 1977) is the Polish mufti of the Muzułmański Związek Religijny (Muslim Religious Union).

== Biography ==
Miśkiewicz was born in Białystok in 1977 but was raised in Suchowola. From 1991 to 1993, he studied Arabic in Syria and Sudan. He continued his education further from 1993 to 2000 studying Arabic, Islamic theology, and Islamic Law at the Islamic University of Medina. In 2000 he was appointed as the imam of the Muslim Religious Union (MRU) of Białystok and then elected as a chairman for the Board of Imams of the MRU of Poland. In 2004, Miśkiewicz became the mufti of Poland and chairman of the Highest Board of the MRU.

== Decorations ==
In 2006, Miśkiewicz received the Silver Cross of Merit (Poland) for the work with minorities and ecumenical work. In 2011, he received the Golden Cross of Merit for the work with the Muslim minorities and for the interfaith dialogue.

== Literature ==
- Piotr Borawski; Aleksander Dubiński (1986). Tatarzy polscy. Warsaw: Iskry. p. 270. ISBN 83-207-0597-5.
- Piotr Borawski (1986). Tatarzy w dawnej Rzeczypospolitej. Warsaw: Ludowa Spółdzielnia Wydawnicza. p. 317. ISBN 83-205-3747-9.
- Jan Tyszkiewicz (1989). Tatarzy na Litwie i w Polsce; studia z dziejów XIII-XVIII w. Warsaw: Państwowe Wydawnictwo Naukowe. p. 343. ISBN 83-01-08894-X.
- Ryszard Saciuk (1989). Tatarzy podlascy. Białystok: Regional Museum of Białystok. p. 36.
