= Adam Bahdaj =

Polish translator and writer

Adam Bahdaj (born 2 January 1918 in Zakopane, died 7 May 1985 in Warsaw) was a Polish translator and writer, known in the 1960s and 1970s for his young adult novels. He was awarded the Gold Cross of Merit in 1975.

== Selected works ==
- Piraci z Wysp Śpiewających [Pirates of the Singing Islands]. Nasza Ksiegarnia. 1966. - listed in the 1984 IBBY honour list
- Telemach w dżinsach [Telemachus in jeans]. Krajowa Agencja Wydawn. 1979.
- Gdzie twój dom, Telemachu? [Where is your home, Telemachus?]. Krajowa Agencja Wydawn. 1982.
