= Małgorzata Kalinowska-Iszkowska =

Polish computer scientist (born 1946)

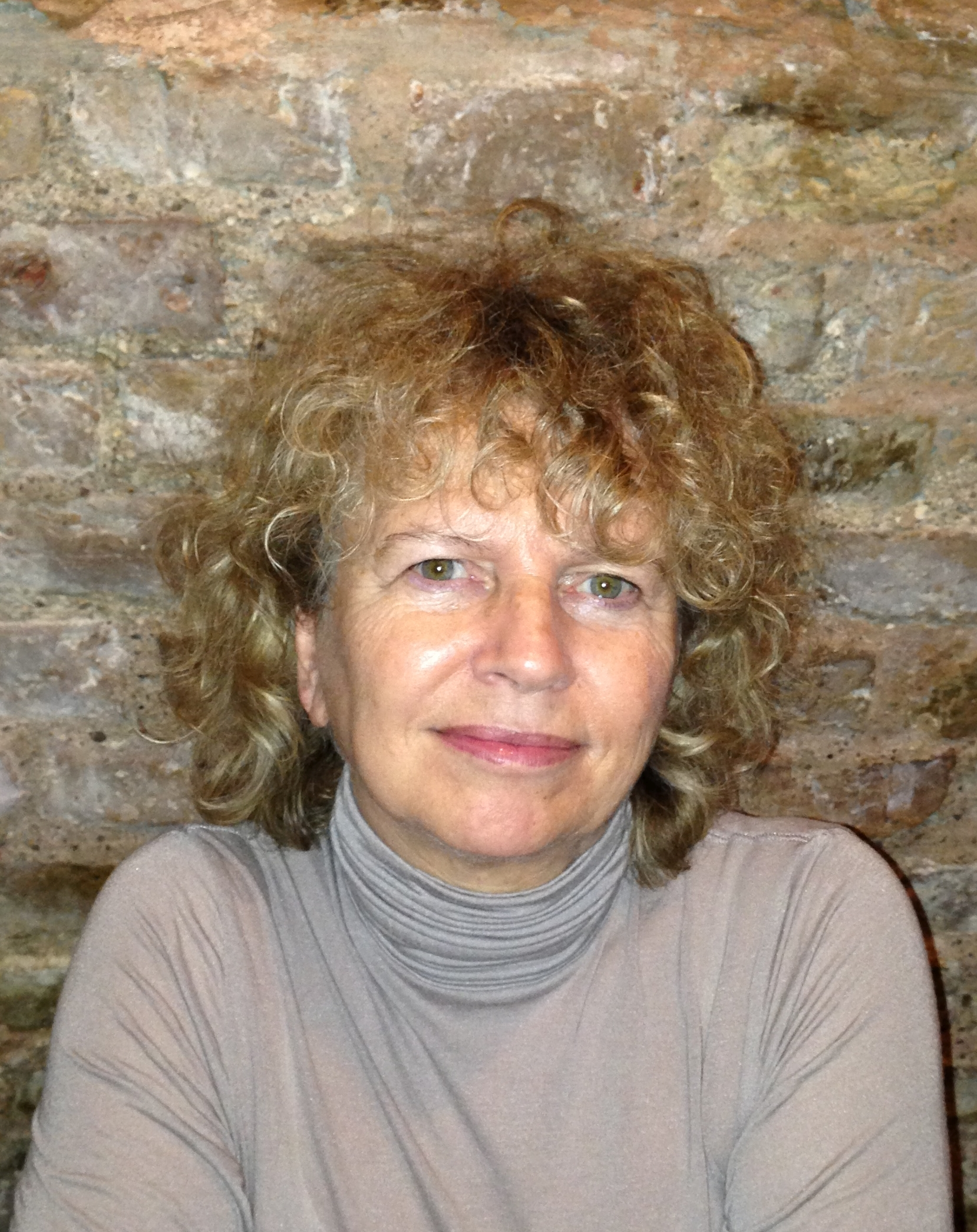
- Born: 29 July 1946 (age 79); Warsaw, Poland

Małgorzata Kalinowska-Iszkowska (born 29 July 1946) is a Polish computer scientist, educator, and activist. She was awarded the Polish Gold Cross of Merit for her work in information technology (IT). She was a member of the Polish Congress of Women.

== Education and career ==
Kalinowska-Iszkowska graduated from Jan Kochanowski Secondary School in Warsaw in Warsaw in 1964. In 1970, she graduated from Warsaw University of Technology with specializations in automation and mathematical machines. A decade later, she obtained her doctorate in technical sciences.

She participated in research work on the early K-202 and KRTM (UMC-20) computers, as well as in the area of fuzzy sets.

=== Career ===
In 1992, Kalinowska-Iszkowska started working for Digital Equipment Polska. In 1996, she joined IBM Polska. In 1999–2000, she worked at TCH Systems SA, and then, until 2004, at Positive and ComputerLand, organizing the Management Competence Center. In the years 2004–2007 she worked for HP Polska as a government affairs manager, dealing with international regulations, including the European Union.

Kalinowska-Iszkowska has been a member of the Polish Information Technology Society (PTI) since 1981, serving on the organization's board from 2000 to 2011. From 2005 to 2011, she represented PTI in the Council of European Professional Informatics Societies (CEPIS), where she also served as vice-president from 2008 to 2011. From 2015, she was again the vice-president. From 2017 she was a member of the management board of the Mazowieckie Branch of the Polish Information Technology Society (Polskie Towarzystwo Informatyczne PTI).

She served as an evaluator of the European Commission as an expert in information security. In 2002, she founded and was the President of the Association of Knowledge Management Practitioners.

Since 2000, she has been involved in discussions about the need for wider participation of women in technical professions, in particular in IT. From 2008 to 2011, she was a board member of European Center for Women and Technology and its representative in Poland. She was identified among the top ten women who were leading the Polish IT industry in 2016. She also participated in the Polish Kongres Kobiet (Congress of Women).

== Awards ==
- Gold Cross of Merit (2005)
- TOP TEN award for women managing Polish ICT businesses (2016)
- Medal of the 70th anniversary of Polish Informatics, awarded by the Chapter of PTI (2018)

== Works ==
- "Kobieta informatyk?" [Who is a female computer scientist?] (in Polish).
- Kalinowska-Iszkowska, Małgorzata (January 2002). E-learning System as Part of the KMS. Proceedings of the Baltic Conference. Vol. 2. BalticDB&IS. pp. 133–142.
