= Marcin Pałys =

Polish chemist and academic

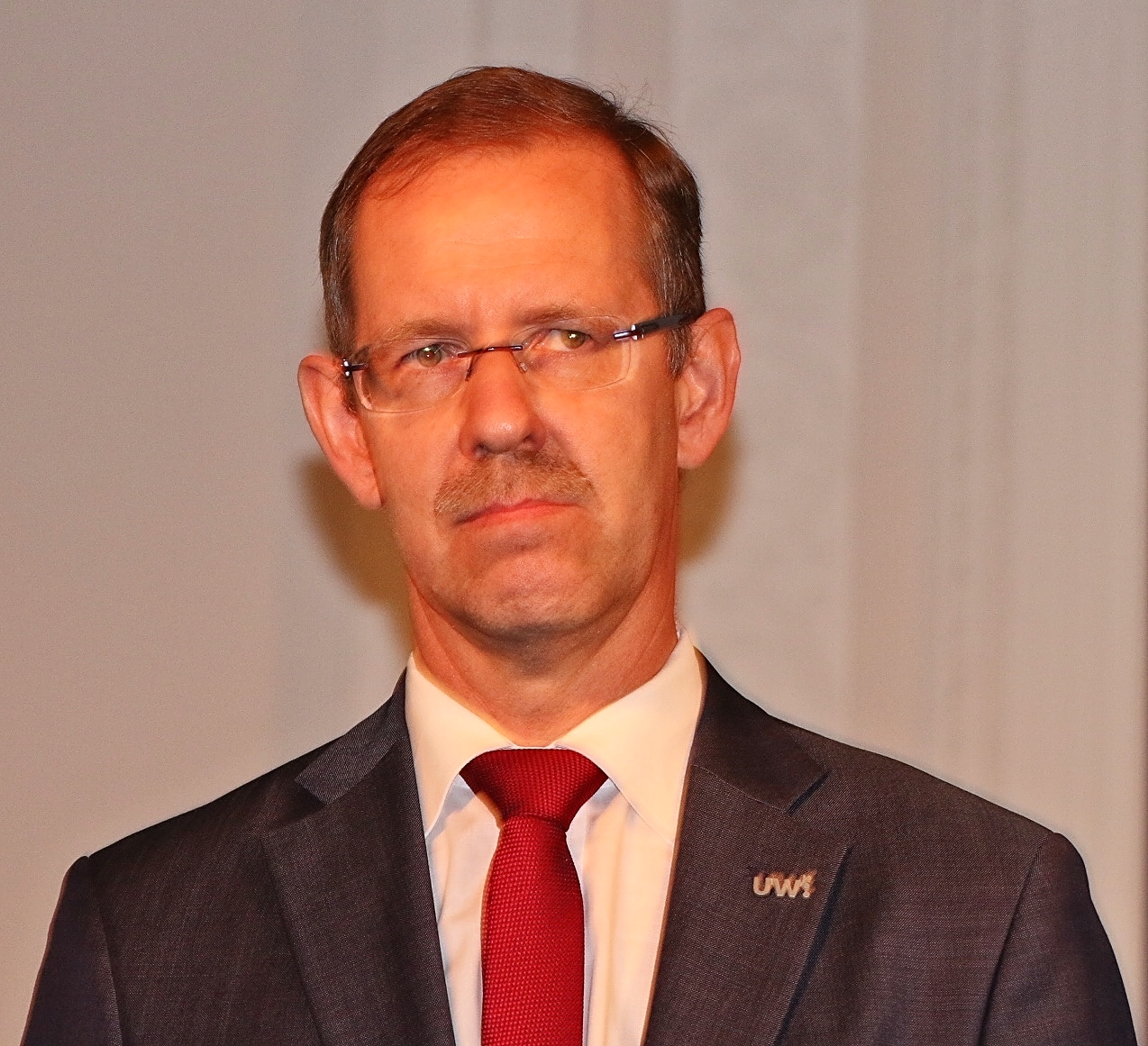
- Born: 5 December 1964 (age 61); Warsaw
- Education: University of Warsaw
- Known for: Electrochemistry
- Predecessor: Katarzyna Chałasińska-Macukow
- Successor: Alojzy Nowak
- Scientific career
- Fields: Chemistry
- Workplaces: University of Warsaw
- Thesis: (1992)

Marcin Jakub Pałys (born December 5, 1964, in Warsaw) is a Polish chemist and academic, holding a habilitation in chemical sciences. He is a university professor at the University of Warsaw, where he served as the Dean of the Faculty of Chemistry for financial affairs (2005–2008), Vice-Rector for Development and Financial Policy (2008–2012), and in the terms 2012–2016 and 2016–2020, the Rector of the University of Warsaw. He also served as the Chair of the Main Council of Science and Higher Education in the XIII term and is a member of the board of the European University Association.
