= Siberian Exiles Cross =

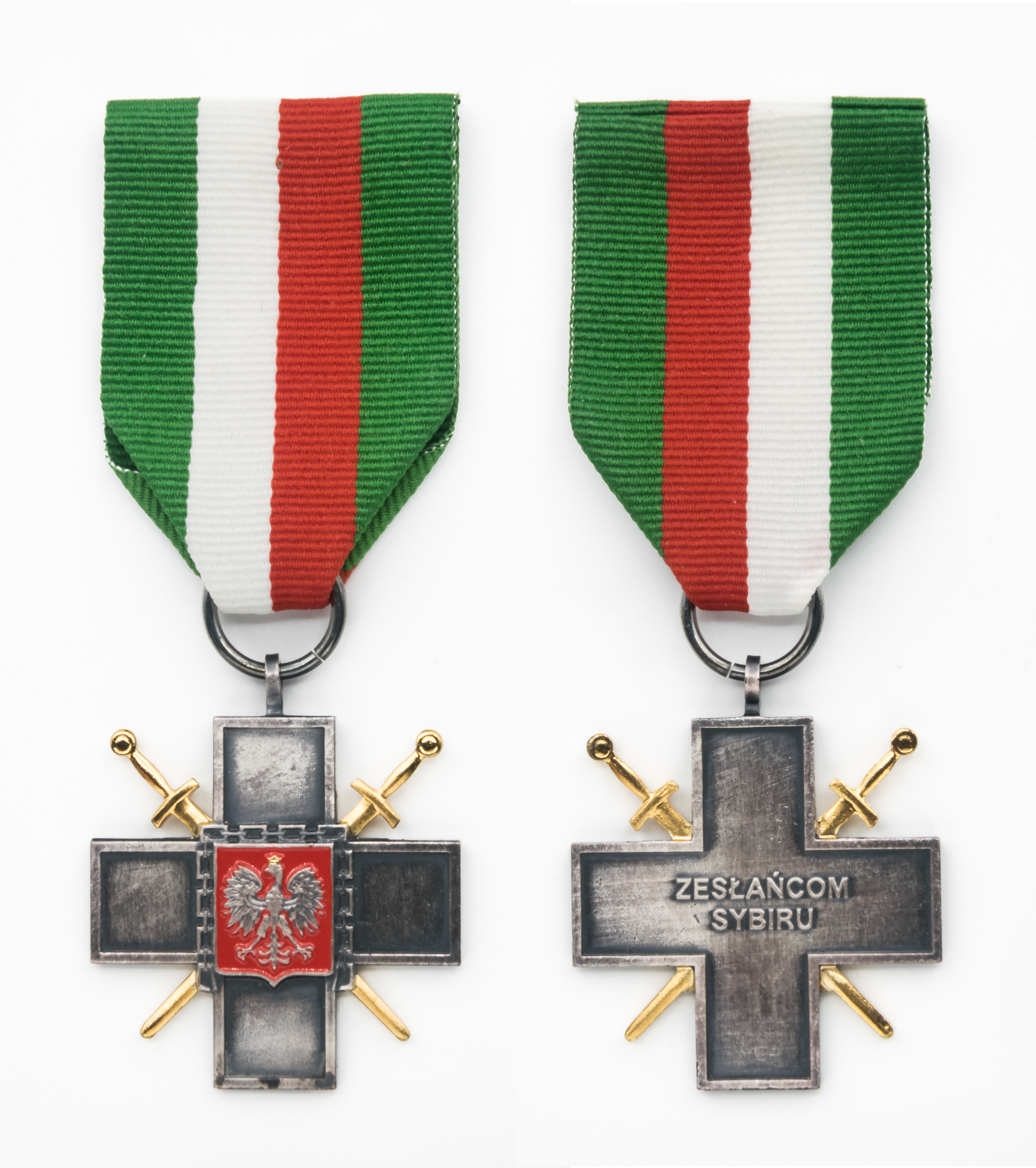
Siberian Exiles Cross

The Siberian Exiles Cross (Polish: Krzyż Zesłańców Sybiru) is a state decoration in Poland awarded by President of Poland. It was established on October 17, 2003 in order to recognise and commemorate the sufferings of Polish citizens deported to Siberia, Kazakhstan and Northern Russia from 1939–1956. The cross memorialises their devotion to the ideals of freedom and independence.

The Military Department of the Office for War Veterans and Victims of Oppression takes part in the award process by recording and verifying the motions pertaining to veterans.

In 2006 the decoration was a matter of controversy. A clerk added the name of General Wojciech Jaruzelski to the list of awardees and President signed the list. Jaruzeski was indeed exiled to Altai Krai in 1941, but he was also behind the martial law in Poland during the anti-Communist protests in the country. When the error was revealed Jaruzelski returned the decoration to President. He remarked that at first he thought that President Lech Kaczyński stood above the historical political split and that the issue is beyond only him, because thousands of Poles had shared the same fate and they probably deserve the award as well.

== See also ==
- Sybirak
- Council for the Protection of Struggle and Martyrdom Sites
- Category of the awardees in Polish wikipedia
