= Halina Zdebska-Biziewska =

Polish sports and Olympic activist

- Born: Halina Teresa Wróbel; May 21, 1960; Ryglice, Poland
- Died: March 17, 2018 (aged 57); Kraków, Poland
- Burial place: Rakowice Cemetery, Kraków
- Known for: physical culture sciences
- Awards: Cross of Merit
- Scientific career
- Fields: philosophy of sport, Olympism, theory of team sports
- Thesis: Bohater sportowy. Studium indywidualnego przypadku Bronisława Czecha (1908–1944) [The Sports Hero: A Case Study of Bronisław Czech (1908–1944)] (1995)
- Doctoral advisor: Józef Lipiec

Halina Teresa Zdebska-Biziewska, née Wróbel (21 May 1960, Ryglice – 17 March 2018, Kraków), was a Polish sports and Olympic activist, a doctor habilitated in physical culture sciences. From 2013 to 2018, she served as the chairwoman of the Fair Play Club of the Polish Olympic Committee. In her youth, she was a volleyball player.

== Childhood and education ==
Halina Teresa Zdebska-Biziewska was born on 21 May 1960 in Ryglice. She attended primary school in Kraków, where she developed an interest in sports from an early age, often representing her school in local and regional competitions. She graduated from Maria Dąbrowska XI High School in Kraków.

During secondary school, she began regular volleyball training with the Korona Kraków Sports Club. In 1983, she graduated with distinction in the coaching program at the University School of Physical Education in Kraków, earning a Master of Sports degree and a Class II coaching qualification in volleyball. In 1984, she completed postgraduate studies in pedagogical preparation at the same academy.

On 21 September 1995, she obtained a doctoral degree in physical culture sciences with her dissertation titled Bohater sportowy. Studium indywidualnego przypadku Bronisława Czecha (1908–1944) [The Sports Hero: A Case Study of Bronisław Czech (1908–1944)], supervised by Józef Lipiec. Reviewers Kazimierz Toporowicz and Zbigniew Krawczyk praised the dissertation for its originality and innovative approach. Her doctoral dissertation was published as a book in 1996, with subsequent editions released in 1997 and 2007. In 2009, she habilitated in physical culture sciences.

== Scientific interests ==
Halina Teresa Zdebska-Biziewska conducted research focusing on the evaluation of physical education program implementation and the effectiveness of selected techniques in team sports.

Seminars on the history of sports with Kazimierz Toporowicz and her initial involvement with the Polish Olympic Academy in 1986 led to a shift in her research focus, which subsequently centered on the humanities of physical culture and the Olympic idea.

In her pioneering habilitation monograph, she attempted to integrate game theory with the humanities. This required a theoretical explanation of the specifics of team sports based on a deeper axiological interpretation. Her work demanded interdisciplinary knowledge encompassing philosophy, sociology, sports psychology, social psychology, and cultural anthropology.

== Professional career ==
During her studies, Halina Zdebska-Biziewska represented AZS-AWF Kraków sports club and, after graduation, became a junior team coach while continuing her own sports activities. In October 1983, she was hired as an assistant coach at the Volleyball Department of the University School of Physical Education in Kraków. At the same time, she completed a teaching internship at Primary School No. 5 in Kraków, conducting physical education classes for volleyball-focused sports classes.

After earning her doctorate, she worked as an assistant professor at the Department of Volleyball Theory and Methodology at the University School of Physical Education in Kraków. In 1998, she co-authored with Jerzy Uzarowicz the handbook Piłka siatkowa: program szkolenia dzieci i młodzieży (Volleyball: A Training Program for Children and Youth). Between 1998 and 2005, she conducted national methodological and training workshops for physical education and sports teachers. She managed the first grant from the Ministry of National Education in the history of the University School of Physical Education in Kraków to implement postgraduate studies in physical education for graduates of related fields. She also served as the head of postgraduate studies for teachers with pedagogical training. She led practical courses for sports and recreation instructors. Starting in 2000, she lectured in postgraduate studies on managing sports organizations, organized by the Institute of Public Affairs at the Jagiellonian University in collaboration with the Polish Olympic Committee.

In 2000, she published Mistrzowie nart (Skiing Champions), profiling Polish Olympic skiers. A year later, she co-authored with Andrzej Stanowski the book Małysz: Bogu dziękuję (Małysz: I Thank God), dedicated to the biography of ski jumper Adam Małysz. In 2004, she authored the epilogue to Józefa Ślusarczyk-Latos' poetry collection Lot nad przepaścią (Flight Over the Abyss). In 2007, she co-authored with Wojciech Kasza the textbook Piłka siatkowa: obrona pola w ujęciu taktycznym podręcznik dla instruktorów i trenerów (Volleyball: Tactical Field Defense – A Guide for Instructors and Coaches).

She was an expert at the Manager Training Center of the Academy of Sport Education in Warsaw and lectured at the Higher School of Banking in Chorzów from 2006 to 2008.

Zdebska-Biziewska collaborated with publications such as Narty, Sportowy Styl, Tempo, Dziennik Polski, Akademicki Przegląd Sportowy, and Magazyn Olimpijski, publishing over 200 articles between 1994 and 2005. She also contributed to the publications of the Salesian Sports Organization of Poland, writing articles and reviews.

In 2011, she completed a research internship at Comenius University in Bratislava, followed by one at the University of Porto in 2013.

She served as the deputy director of the Institute of Social Sciences at the Faculty of Physical Education and Sport of the University School of Physical Education in Kraków. In the academic year 2014/2015, she initiated the establishment of the Olympism Workshop within the Institute of Social Sciences.

Zdebska-Biziewska reviewed four doctoral dissertations and two habilitation theses. She also served as editor-in-chief of the scientific journals Studia Humanistyczne and Studies in Sport Humanities.

== Sport and Olympic activities ==
From 1995 to 1999, Halina Zdebska-Biziewska was a member of the board of AZS-AWF Kraków. She also served as the secretary and a member of the presidium of the Lesser Poland Olympic Council. From 1995 to 2000, she was a member of the Culture and Education Commission of the Polish Olympic Committee and belonged to the Young Circle of the Polish Olympic Academy, and from 2001, to the Polish Olympic Academy. In the same year, she represented the Polish Olympic Committee and the Polish Olympic Academy at the 36th session of the International Olympic Academy for young participants.

She was also a member of the advisory team for the cultural-educational program operating under the Olympic Strategy Office in Kraków during the preparation of Zakopane's bid to host the 2006 Winter Olympics. Since 2002, she was a member and later the president of the International Scientific Society of Sports Games. She also collaborated with the Wisła Kraków Sports Society in organizing cultural events related to artistic competitions marking the club's 95th and 100th anniversaries. She was a member of the program council of the society.

During the term between 2011 and 2015, Zdebska-Biziewska was a member of the Committee for Rehabilitation, Physical Culture, and Social Integration of the Polish Academy of Sciences. From 2013 to 2018, she served as the chair of the Fair Play Club of the Polish Olympic Committee and was a member of the board of the Pierre de Coubertin International Committee.

In 2014, she was part of the editorial team for the book Czysta gra: Fair play (Clean Play: Fair Play), which was also available in English. The following year, at a session organized by the International Olympic Academy for directors of national Olympic academies, she delivered a lecture on striving for sporting excellence as a central element of Olympic education. In 2014, as a representative of the Polish Olympic Committee, she participated in the 20th European Sports Congress in Riga, and in 2015, she attended the International Scientific Seminar The Church and Sport in Vatican City. In 2016, during the 22nd General Assembly of the European Fair Play Movement in Vienna, she was elected to the movement's board.

In January 2018, she represented Poland for the last time at the reporting and electoral session of the Pierre de Coubertin International Committee in Lausanne.

== Death and commemoration ==
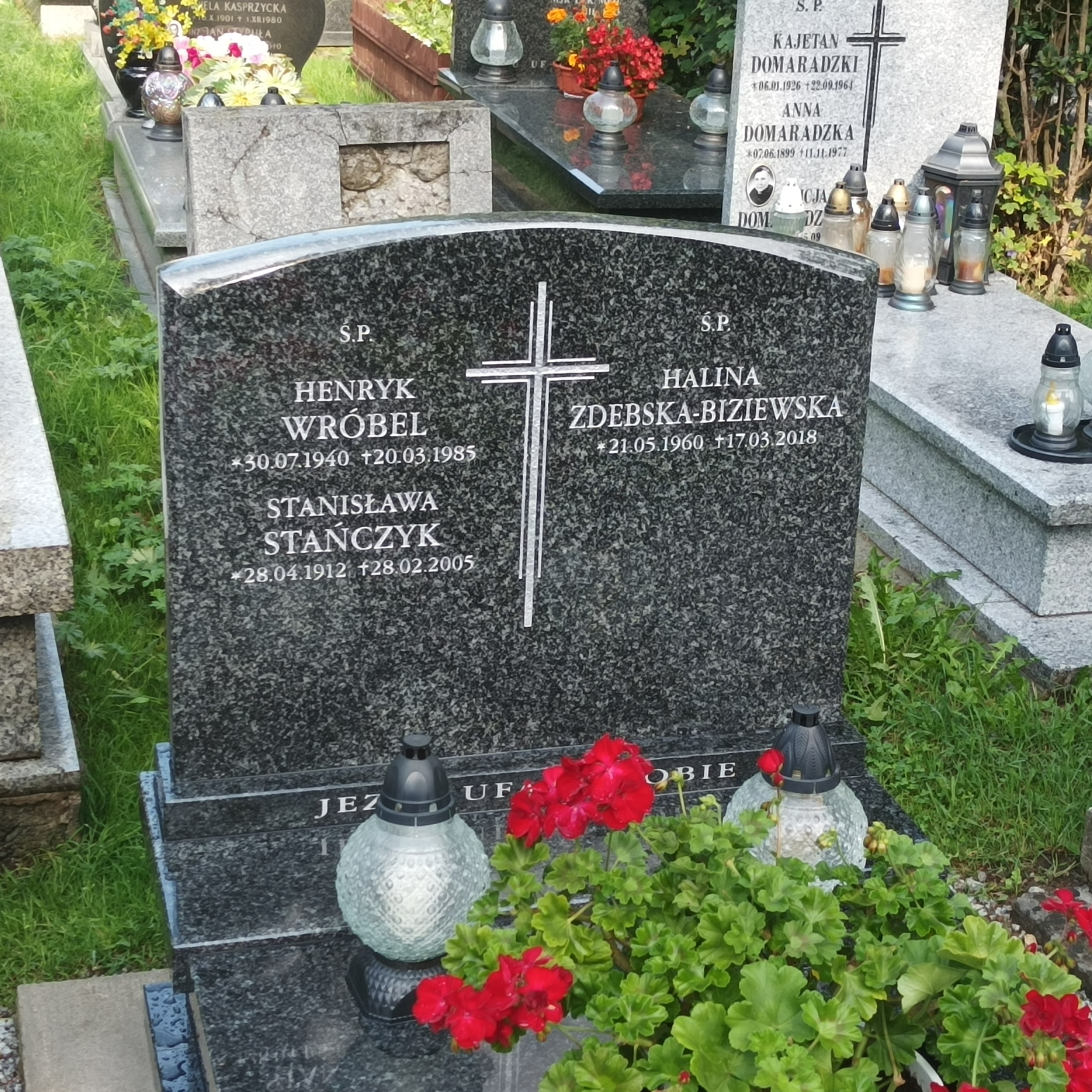
Grave of Professor Halina Zdebska-Biziewska at the Military Cemetery on Prandoty Street in Kraków

Halina Zdebska-Biziewska died after a brief illness on 17 March 2018 in Kraków. She was buried in the family grave at the military cemetery on Prandoty Street in Kraków (plot XCIII-18-31), which is part of the Rakowice Cemetery.

== Awards ==
In 1984, Zdebska-Biziewska was awarded the Silver Badge of AZS-AWF Kraków, and in 1988, she received the Gold Badge of the Kraków District of the Polish Volleyball Federation.

In 1996, her doctoral dissertation was honored by the Polish Olympic Committee with the Bronze Olympic Laurel Award in the category of scientific and popular science works. In 2002, she was honored by the Mayor of Kraków, Andrzej Gołaś, with the title "Friend of Sport" for her contribution to the development of physical culture in Kraków.

On 19 September 2005, she was awarded the Silver Cross of Merit by the President of Poland, Aleksander Kwaśniewski, for exemplary and exceptionally conscientious fulfillment of professional duties. In 2009, she received the 90th Anniversary Medal of the Polish Olympic Committee. She was also awarded the 30th Anniversary Medal of the Polish Olympic Academy.

== Private life ==
Zdebska-Biziewska was married to Jerzy Biziewski and had two children – a daughter, Joanna, and a son, Wojciech. Her interests included classical music, theatre, literature, and sports. She was fluent in foreign languages: English and Russian.
