= Piotr Osiecki =

Polish politician and rugby union footballer

Piotr Osiecki (born 22 December 1961, in Sochaczew) is a Polish politician, and former rugby union footballer. He played 35 matches for Poland national rugby union team. Between 2010 and 2024 he was a mayor of Sochaczew town. He is member of Right of the Republic party.
