= Cross of Merit (Poland) =

Polish civil state decoration

Cross of Merit Krzyż Zasługi
- Current version of the Gold Cross of Merit
- Type: Medal awarded in three grades: Gold, Silver, and Bronze
- Awarded for: Exemplary and beyond standard expectations public service or humanitarian work
- Country: Poland
- Presented by: the President of Poland
- Clasps: denotes subsequent award
- Status: Currently awarded
- Established: 23 June 1923
- First award: 11 November 1923

Precedence
- Next (higher): Cross of Merit with Swords
- Next (lower): Military Cross of Merit with Swords, Air Force Cross of Merit with Swords, Navy Cross of Merit with Swords

The Cross of Merit (Polish: Krzyż Zasługi) is a Polish civil state decoration established on 23 June 1923 to acknowledge outstanding service to the state.

== History ==
At the time of its establishment it was recognised as Poland's highest civilian distinction conferred upon individuals who demonstrated exceptional dedication and service to the nation and society beyond standard expectations. Recipients may be awarded the distinction up to twice in each grade.

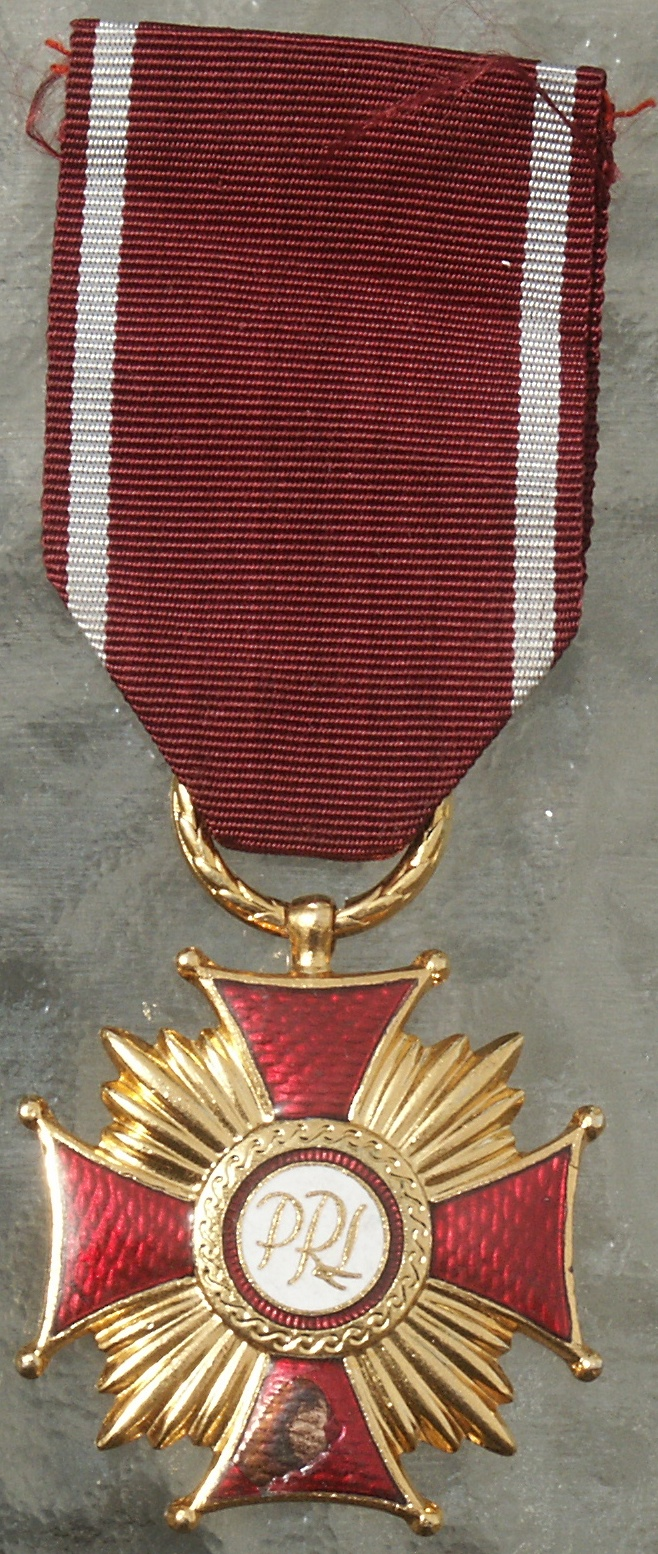
Gold Cross of Merit issued by the People's Republic

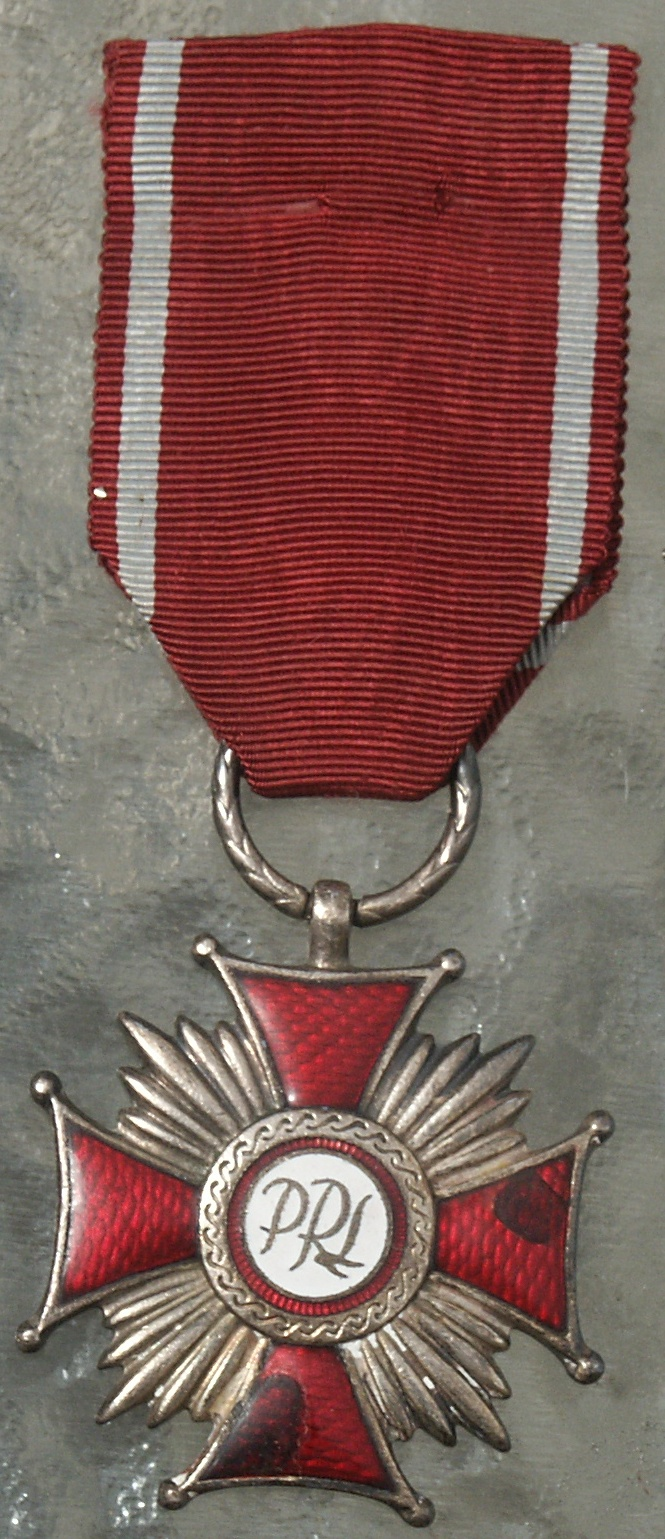
Silver Cross of Merit issued by the People's Republic

=== The Order ===
The Order has three grades:

- Gold Cross of Merit
- Silver Cross of Merit
- Bronze Cross of Merit

== Recipients ==
=== Gold Cross of Merit ===
Name	Date	Notes
Balkan Devlen	June 2025	for outstanding merits in promoting Polish culture, and for activity within the Polish diaspora
Przemysław Krych	July 2024	for exemplary public and charity service, Poland
Edyta Piecha [Edita Piekha]	2012	Soviet and Russian singer of Polish origin.
Robert Czernkowski	April 2023	for service to the Polish community in Australia
Edward Karpinski	January 2023	For exemplary public service in the Polish community in Saskatoon, Saskatchewan, Canada
Ewa Hojna	13 May 2022	Director of Polish School Cultural Association (ACEP), Spain
Jan-Krzysztof Duda	2021	chess grandmaster
Rick Sahar	2020	For building good relations through shared events within the Polish-Jewish communities in Wellington, New Zealand
Helena Kmieć	2017	for merits in charitable and social activities and her commitment to people in need of help
Wanda Paulina Gluszek	2016	political activist, poet; Chicago, Illinois
Michał Korwin-Szymanowski, also known as Michel Korwin	2015	Montréal, Canada
John P. Lynch	3 November 2014	CEO and founder of Lynka
Philippe Blain	27 October 2014	coach of Poland men's national volleyball team – World Champions 2014
Fabian Drzyzga	27 October 2014	volleyball player, World Champion 2014
Mateusz Mika	27 October 2014	volleyball player, World Champion 2014
Karol Kłos	27 October 2014	volleyball player, World Champion 2014
Michał Kwiatkowski	2014	Polish road cyclist
Andrzej Wrona	27 October 2014	volleyball player, World Champion 2014
Paweł Zatorski	27 October 2014	volleyball player, World Champion 2014
Joanna Zawadzka	2 May 2014	community activist living in Scotland, director of Polish Cultural Festival Association
Aleksandra Ziółkowska-Boehm	20 June 2014	U.S.-based writer and academic
Katarzyna Maria Dziewanowska	26 September 2013	scientific research, University of Idaho
Elwira Grossman	August 2013	Scotland
John Dodunski	March 2013	New Zealand
Robert Dodunski	March 2013	New Zealand
Bogdan Labecki	2013	
Margaret Scannell née Dodunski	March 2013	New Zealand
Agnieszka Radwańska	2013	tennis player
Michal Kuleczka	2013	
Máté Szabó	10 December 2012	The Ambassador of Poland to Hungary, Roman Kowalski presented the award to recognize Máté Szabó 's merits in strengthening the protection of human rights as Ombudsman and for his work developing Polish-Hungarian relations.
Thomas Gabriel Grasza Esq	11 November 2011	postage stamp and coin designer and noted Canadian-Polish philatelist of four decades
Izabella Zielińska	2011	Polish pianist
Tomasz Miśkiewicz	2011	Silver Cross of Merit 2006, mufti, for work with the immigrant and native Islamic Youth, Gold Cross of Merit 2011, for work with the Muslim minorities, and for interfaith dialogue
Bronisław Oczkowski	14 December 2010	Melbourne, Australia
Captain Stefan-Joseph Camilleri	23 January 2009	Warsaw, for distinguished and outstanding service to Poland and its people
Adam Wiercioch	11 October 2008	Polish épée fencer and Olympic silver medalist; awarded for outstanding sporting achievements.
Geertjan Lassche	2007	Dutch reporter and documentary film maker
Maciej Klich	2005	Polish historian, graphic artist, and a former anti-communist Polish independence diaspora activist
Maria Baliszewska	2005	Polish ethnomusicologist and journalist, founder of the Radio Centre for Folk Culture (Radiowe Centrum Kultury Ludowej)
Małgorzata Kalinowska-Iszkowska	2005	Polish computer scientist
Agata Mroz-Olszewska	2005	volleyball player, double European champion team member, 2003 and 2005
Adam Skorek	2004	
Ryszard Antoni Kuśmierczyk	August 2002	Engineer and community leader based ub Windsor, Ontario, Canada
Alojzy Nowak	2002	
Jerzy Zralski	2000	II WW veteran and writer.
Jerzy Łucki	August 1995	Toronto, Canada
Captain Raymond Delver Smith Carrington J.P.	1990	for distinguished and outstanding service to Poland and its people
Henri Strzelecki	1990	co-founder of Henri Lloyd.
Jan Bujak	July 1984	Corporate owner
Stanisław Nosal	1979	Polish Colonel of the 5th Rocket Artillery Battalion in Modlin Fortress, Poland.
Michael Biegler		German head coach of the Poland national handball team
Ryszard Jurkowski	1977 (Silver) and 1984 (Gold)	Silver and Gold Cross of Merit, Polish architect
Zbigniew Janowicz		Gold Cross of Merit, polish professor
Marian Machowski		Polish footballer and researcher
Wiesława Korzeń	1976	accountant, teacher
Adam Bahdaj	1975	Translator and writer
Edward Lisiowski	1974	Mayor of Wojszyn.
Alojzy Walentego Zygmunt	29 November 1972	For fifteen years of uninterrupted and distinguished work in the mining industry
Krzysztof Kazimierz Miller	1964	architect, urbanist
Stanisław Horno-Popławski	1952	Polish painter, sculptor and pedagogue.
Moses Schorr		Rabbi, Polish historian, politician, bible scholar, assyriologist and orientalist
Stefania Skwarczyńska		Polish theorist and historian of literature, theatrologist, full professor, honorary doctor of the University of Łódź, World War II resistance fighter
Afanasij Poliszczuk	1946	veterinary service chief in the First Polish Army
Edvard Kardelj	1946	
Stanisław Sylwester Alfonzy Grodyński	1939	Polish Governor (Starost), military intelligence officer, lawyer.
Bronisława Rychter-Janowska	1939	Cracovian artist.
Józefa Bramowska	1939	Politician
Witold Bełza	1938	Polish librarian, writer, publicist and cultural activist.
Stefan Kaczmarz	1937	Polish mathematician
Janina Czaykowska Underwood	1937	Polish Relief fundraiser and campaigner in Australia
Józef Weyssenhoff	1932	Polish writer, novelist, poet, literary critic, publisher.
Arthur Szyk	1931	Polish-Jewish fine artist, book illustrator, and political artist.
Emil Rauer	20 September 1925	industrialist, creator and commander of a railway protection formation, social activist, and independence fighter

=== Silver Cross of Merit ===
Name	Date	Notes
Stefan Bukowski	1977	Polish Colonel
Maria Boniecka	1937	work with illiterate adults
Francis K. Czyzewski	4 July 1939	writer, astronomer, meteorologist, photographer, playwright, WSBT Polish Hour radio program host, life member of the solar division of the American Variable Star Observers at Harvard College Observatory (1951); former president, Polish-American Central Civic Committee; staff writer, South Bend Tribune; South Bend, Indiana
Adela Dankowska	1970	Polish glider pilot
Grzegorz Fryc	September 2014	New York
Helena Gąsienica Daniel		Olympic cross-country skier
Marcin Pawel Grzadka	November 2013	Harcmistrz, co-founder of YPCPA. & chairman of Quo Vadis Leadership Conference. – Canada
Rudolf Gundlach		Gundlach tank periscope inventor
Robert Makłowicz	2004	journalist and historian, notable for promoting the Polish cuisine
Tomasz Moczerniuk	September 2014	New York
Emilia Napieralska		president of the Polish Women's Alliance of America
Witold Pilecki	1938	Soldier
Jan Sienkiewicz	October 1944	Polish Army Officer
Filip Slipaczek	May 2014	UK
Adam Świerkocz	2005	Polish brigadier general
Jerzy Troszczynski		photographer
Krzysztof Wojciechowski	August 2013	Poland
Wlodzimierz Mieczyslaw Wojciechowski	1973	Polish soldier and resistance fighter, London
Czesław s. Ignacego Przybylak	1956	decorated Polish humanitarian activist, decorated worker of the state and Holocaust Survivor
Jacek Banasiak	2014	Professor and DST/NRF SARChI Chair in Mathematical Models and Methods in Biosciences and Bioengineering at the University of Pretoria
Maciej Żółtowski	2002	Polish conductor and composer
Alex Dancyg	2007	Historian and advocate of Polish-Israeli relations
Anna Styszyńska	1997	Climatologist
Halina Zdebska-Biziewska	19 September 2005	exemplary and exceptionally conscientious fulfillment of professional duties

=== Bronze Cross of Merit ===
Name	Date	Notes
Stefan Ficner	1945	Great Grandfather, Patriot, Golina, Polska
Edward Lisiowski	1974	Mayor of Wojszyn
Stanisław Łukaszewicz	1944	Bronze Cross of Merit with Swords, Sargeant 10 Dragoons, 1 Polish Armoured Division, 1 Polish Corps for action at Falaise Gap, France 1944
Piotr Paweł Morta	1998	Also Silver Cross of Merit – 2010
Emil Jung	September 1996	Stellenbosch, South Africa, Political activist and advocate of Polish-South African relations
Marguerite Ettienette Andrée Mouton – née Guillemin	1950s	Educator; Soissons, France
Elżbieta Smereka	3 May 1987	For meritorious social services
Tomasz Trembowski	2013	Canada
Dariusz Jemielniak	2018	
Krzysztof Ligęza	2006	habilitated doctor specializing in security studies, reserve officer of the Polish Navy
Stanisław Zarzecki	1938	A corporal pilot of the Polish Armed Forces, a participant in the Invasion of Poland. He perished during a combat mission piloting a PZL.23 Karaś aircraft.
Karoline Podolak	2024	For contributions to the arts

== See also ==
- Cross of Merit (Polish Scouting and Guiding Association)
- Cross of Merit (Austria-Hungary), the Austro-Hungarian Empire medal that it replaced
