= Departmental decorations of Poland =

Departmental decorations of Poland (Polish: Polskie odznaczenia resortowe) are decorations issued by Polish ministers and heads of some other state establishments. They do not have the status of Polish state decorations, which are usually issued by the head of the state.

== Current decorations ==
(Dates of establishment/revisionss)

- 1951/1968/1996 – Medal „Siły Zbrojne w Służbie Ojczyzny” – Minister ON
- 1956/1972/1982/2000 – Medal Komisji Edukacji Narodowej – Minister EN
- 1962/2004 – Odznaka „Za opiekę nad zabytkami” – Minister KiDN
- 1966/1669/1991/2012/2013 – Medal „Za Zasługi dla Obronności Kraju” – Minister ON
- 1969/1994/2005/2012 – Decoration of Honor Meritorious for Polish Culture, Odznaka honorowa „Zasłużony dla Kultury Polskiej” – Minister KiDN
- 1976/2016 – Medal „Opiekun Miejsc Pamięci Narodowej” – Prezes IPN
- 1983/2005 – Odznaka honorowa „Za Zasługi dla Ochrony Środowiska i Gospodarki Wodnej” – Minister Ś
- 1986/2003 – Odznaka honorowa „Za zasługi dla ochrony zdrowia” – Minister Z
- 1988/2004 – Odznaka Honorowa za Zasługi dla Ochrony Pracy – GIP
- 1995/2003 – Odznaka honorowa „Za Zasługi dla Wynalazczości” – Prezes RM
- 1996/2001/2003 – Odznaka honorowa „Zasłużony dla Łączności” – Minister IiB
- 1996/1997 – Odznaka honorowa „Zasłużony dla Systemu Badań i Certyfikacji” – Dyrektor PCBiC
- 1996/2001 – Odznaka honorowa „Zasłużony dla Rolnictwa” – Minister RiRW
- 1997/2001 – Odznaka honorowa „Zasłużony dla polskiej geologii” – Minister Ś
- 1997/2000 – Odznaka honorowa „Zasłużony Pracownik Morza” – Minister GMiŻŚ
- 1997/2000 – Odznaka honorowa „Zasłużony dla transportu RP” – Minister IiB
- 1997/2000 – Odznaka honorowa „Zasłużony dla drogownictwa” – Minister IiB
- 1997 – Odznaka honorowa „Zasłużony dla Leśnictwa” – Minister Ś
- 1997/2006 – Odznaka honorowa „Zasłużony Honorowy Dawca Krwi” – PCK
- 1997/2005 – Odznaka „Honorowy Dawca Krwi – Zasłużony dla Zdrowia Narodu” – Minister Z
- 1997/2006/2008 – Odznaka „Zasłużony dla Ochrony Przeciwpożarowej” – Minister SW
- 1997/2003/2010 – Odznaka „Za zasługi w pracy penitencjarnej” – Minister Spraw.
- 1998/2002 – Odznaka honorowa „Za Zasługi dla Turystyki” – Minister SiT
- 1998/2001/2016 – Odznaka honorowa „Za zasługi dla Energetyki” – Minister R
- 1999/2002/2009/2016 – Odznaka honorowa „Za Zasługi dla Geodezji i Kartografii” – Minister AiC
- 1999/2002/2013/2016 – Odznaka honorowa „Za zasługi dla budownictwa” – Minister IiB
- 1999 – Medal Wojska Polskiego – Minister ON
- 2000 – Odznaka honorowa „Zasłużony dla Kolejnictwa” – Minister IiB
- 2001 – Medal „Za Zasługi dla Policji” – Minister SW
- 2001/2016 – Odznaka honorowa „Zasłużony dla górnictwa RP” – Minister R
- 2003 – Odznaka honorowa „Za zasługi dla statystyki RP” – Prezes GUS
- 2003/2011 – Odznaka honorowa „Za Zasługi dla bankowości RP” – Prezes NBP
- 2003 – Odznaka honorowa „Za Zasługi dla Finansów Publicznych RP” – Minister F
- 2004 – Medal za Zasługi dla Straży Granicznej – Minister SW
- 2005 – Medal for Merit to Culture – Gloria Artis, Medal „Zasłużony Kulturze Gloria Artis” – Minister KiDN
- 2005/2008 – Odznaka „Dawca Przeszczepu” – Minister Z
- 2009 – Bene Merito honorary distinction, Odznaka Honorowa „Bene merito” – Minister SZ
- 2009 – Odznaka honorowa „Za Zasługi dla Ochrony Praw Człowieka” – RPO
- 2010/2012 – Odznaka „Semper paratus” – DGSW
- 2011 – Medal „Pro Patria” – Kierownik UDSKiOR
- 2011 – Odznaka Honorowa „Za zasługi w działaniach poza granicami RP” – Minister SW
- 2011 – Odznaka Honorowa imienia gen. Stefana Roweckiego „Grota” – Szef ABW
- 2011/2013 – Odznaka Honorowa „Za zasługi w zapewnianiu bezpieczeństwa państwa poza granicami RP” – Prezes RM
- 2011/2016 – Odznaka honorowa „Zasłużony dla Przemysłu Naftowego i Gazowniczego” – Minister E
- 2012 – Odznaka „Za Zasługi dla Sportu” – Minister SiT
- 2013 – Odznaka Honorowa za Zasługi dla Ochrony Praw Dziecka – RPD
- 2013 – Odznaka Honorowa Zasłużonego dla Bezpieczeństwa w Górnictwie – Prezes WUG
- 2014 – Odznaka Honorowa za Zasługi dla Rozwoju Gospodarki RP – Minister R
- 2015 – Odznaka Honorowa za Zasługi dla Legislacji – Prezes RM
- 2015/2016 – Odznaka Honorowa za Zasługi dla Samorządu Terytorialnego – Minister AiC
- 2015 – Odznaka Honorowa Primus in Agendo – Minister RPiPS
- 2015 – Odznaka honorowa „Działacza opozycji antykomunistycznej lub osoby represjonowanej z powodów politycznych” – Kierownik UDSKiOR
- 2015 – Medal „Reipublicae Memoriae Meritum” – Prezes IPN
- 2018 – Medal „Pro Bono Poloniae” – Kierownik UDSKiOR
- 2020 – Odznaka Honorowa Meritis pro Familia – Minister RPiPS
- 2021 - Odznaka okolicznościowa Medal Trzydziestolecia Powołania Straży Granicznej

== Former decorations ==
- 1962: Honorary badge Meritorious Activist of Culture (Polish: Zasłużony Działacz Kultury); superseded by the Medal for Merit to Culture – Gloria Artis
