= Gloria Artis Medal for Merit to Culture =

Polish decoration for achievement in the arts

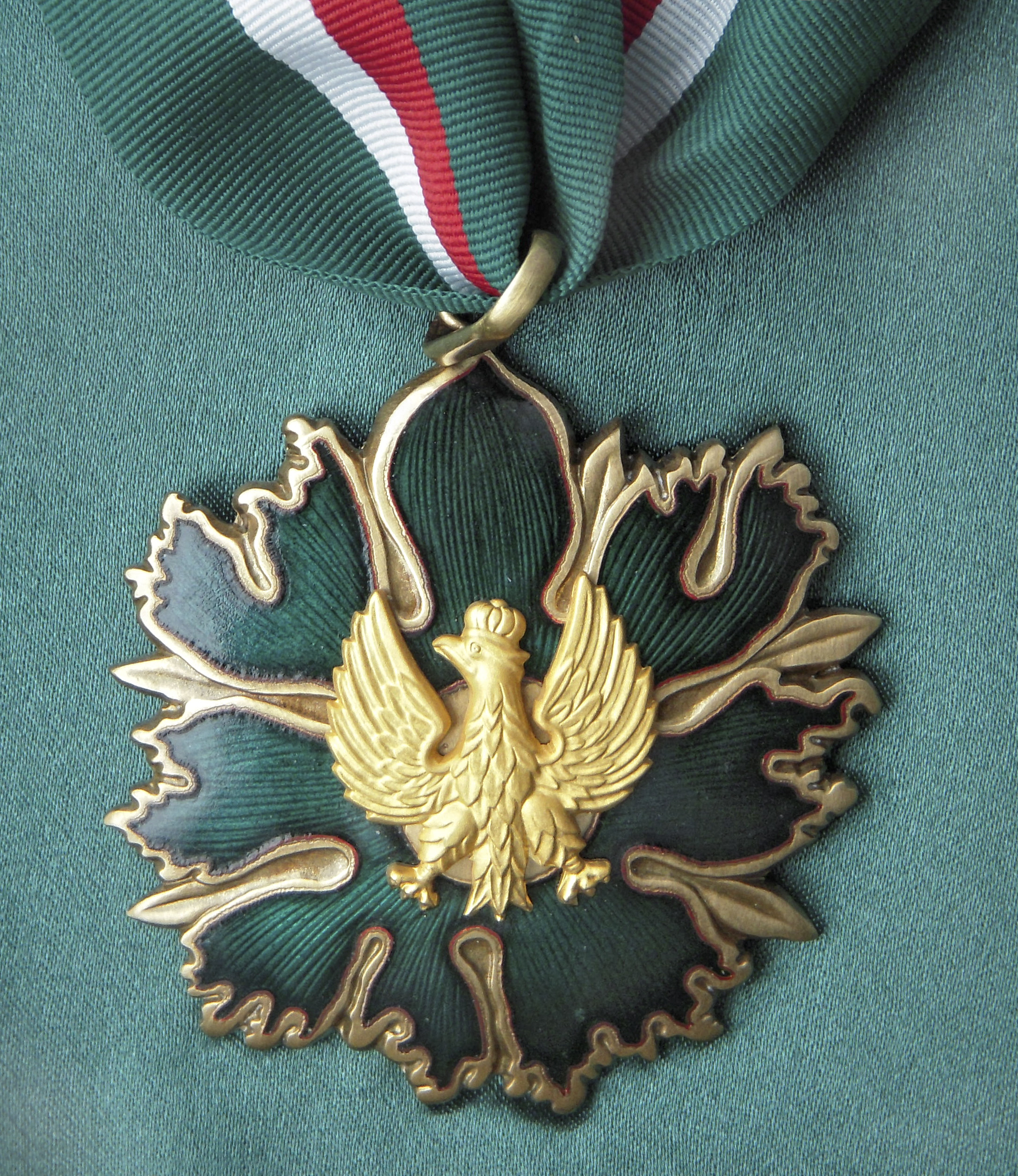
Gold Medal of Gloria Artis.

The Gloria Artis Medal for Merit to Culture (Polish: Zasłużony Kulturze Gloria Artis) or Gloria Artis Medal, is a departmental decoration of Poland in arts awarded by the Ministry of Culture and National Heritage of the Republic of Poland to persons and organizations for distinguished contributions to, or protection of the Polish culture and national heritage.

There are three classes for the medal: gold, silver and bronze with a green, blue or claret ribbon, respectively, with central white and red stripes. This award was instituted on 17 June 2005. as a replacement of the honorary badge „Zasłużony Działacz Kultury”, as part of the general reform in management of culture and education.

== Gallery ==
Gold, Silver and Bronze Medal Ribbons
Ribbon of the Gold Medal.

Ribbon of the Silver Medal.

Ribbon of the Bronze Medal.

== See also ==
- Decoration of Honor Meritorious for Polish Culture
- Orders, decorations, and medals of Poland
- Category:Recipients of the Medal for Merit to Culture – Gloria Artis
