= Pro Patria Medal (Poland) =

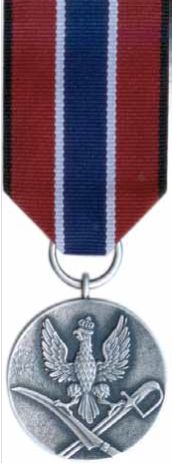
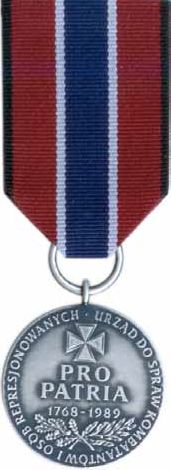
- Obverse and reverse of the Pro Patria Medal
- Awarded for: Outstanding contributions in perpetuating the memory of the people and deeds in the struggle for Polish independence during World War II
- Country: Poland
- Presented by: the Office for War Veterans and Victims of Oppression
- Established: 1 September 2011
- Ribbon bar of the medal

Precedence
- Next (lower): Pro Memoria Medal

The Pro Patria Medal is a civil state decoration of Poland. Established in 2011, it is awarded by the Head of the Office for War Veterans and Victims of Oppression.

== Criteria ==
The Pro Patria Medal is awarded by the Head of the Office for War Veterans and Victims of Oppression based upon an application with documentation from veteran and victim of oppression groups. Recommendations may also be made by departments of the Polish Government or Polish diplomatic missions and military attachés. The medal is awarded to mark special merit in strengthening and treasuring the memory of the Polish people's fight for the independence of the Polish Republic during and following World War II.

== Description ==
The medal is made of silver metal, 36 mm in diameter. The obverse depicts a crowned Polish Eagle sitting atop a sabre crossed with a war scythe. The reverse bears a cross pattee above the three-line inscription PRO PATRIA 1768-1989, with a crossed laurel and oak spray below. The date 1768 represents the year of the Bar Confederation, the first rebellion to restore an independent Poland. Around the edge is the inscription URZAD DO SPRAW KOMBATANTOW I OSOB REPRESJONOWANYCH (Office for War Veterans and Victims of Oppression). The medal hangs from a ring suspension, attached to a 38 mm crimson ribbon with a dark blue central stripe bordered by narrow white stripes. At the edges are narrow black stripes.

== Notable recipients ==
- Karol Nawrocki
- Andrzej Papierz
- Piotr Paweł Morta
- Zbigniew Ścibor-Rylski
- Anna Stupnicka-Bando
- Jerzy Maculewicz
