= Golden Microphone (Poland) =

The Golden Microphone (Polish: Złoty Mikrofon) is a Polish award issued by Polskie Radio since 1969 for people who support the development of Polish public radio or have outstanding creative achievements for public radio.

There is also the Diamond Microphone award, introduced in 1995 specifically for the personalities of Polskie Radio.
