= Honorary badge of anti-communist activist or a person repressed for political reasons =

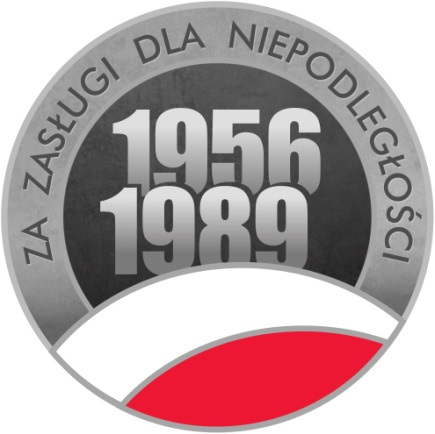
- Awarded for: Anti-communist activity during 1956-1989 & people repressed for political reasons
- Country: Poland
- Presented by: Office for War Veterans and Victims of Oppression
- Established: March 20, 2015
- Related: Cross of Freedom and Solidarity

Honorary badge of anti-communist opposition activist or repressed person for political reasons is a Polish honorary badge, which is awarded by the Head of the Office for Veterans and Victims of Oppression to anti-communist opposition activists and people repressed for political reasons during the Polish People's Republic.

== Honouring rules ==
The badge was established on March 20, 2015 by the Act on the activists of the anti-communist opposition and persons repressed for political reasons as the recognition of the special services for Poland by those of its citizens who in the years from 1956-1989 engaged in anti-communist activities aimed at regaining the sovereignty and independence of Poland.

According to the Act, an anti-communist opposition activist is someone who participated in regaining Poland's independence and sovereignty for at least 12 months between January 1, 1956 and June 4, 1989, within the framework of organized structures or in cooperation with them, under the threat of criminal liability.

== Creation ==
The Office for Veterans and Victims of Oppression launched a competition for the graphic design of an honour badge and ID card for former anti-communist opposition activists and political prisoners on May 27, 2015. As a consequence of this competition, the team tasked with resolving it abandoned the selection of the winning idea in July 2015 in favor of Ryszard Szwemer, the designer of the winning ID card.

As a result of the statutory delegation, on July 17, 2015, the Minister of Labor and Social Policy presented a draft regulation containing a pattern for an honorary badge that was developed with the participation of anti-communist opposition activists and people incarcerated for political reasons who were part of the team evaluating the works submitted in the open competition for graphic design of the honorary badge and ID card. In addition to models of ID cards, the draft of this rule includes the winning design of Ryszard Szwemer's ID card (after necessary modifications).

Due to the fact that the people entitled to receive the badge of honor in principle coincides with the people eligible to receive the Cross of Freedom and Solidarity, the badge of honor was given a shape and form enabling it to be worn in less official situations, on a daily basis as a specific environmental badge. Such a solution prevents the function of the Cross of Freedom and Solidarity from being doubled by the badge of honor.

== See also ==
- Cross of Freedom and Solidarity
- Polish People's Republic
