= Office for War Veterans and Victims of Oppression =

- Urząd do Spraw Kombatantów i Osób Represjonowanych
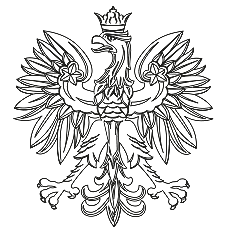

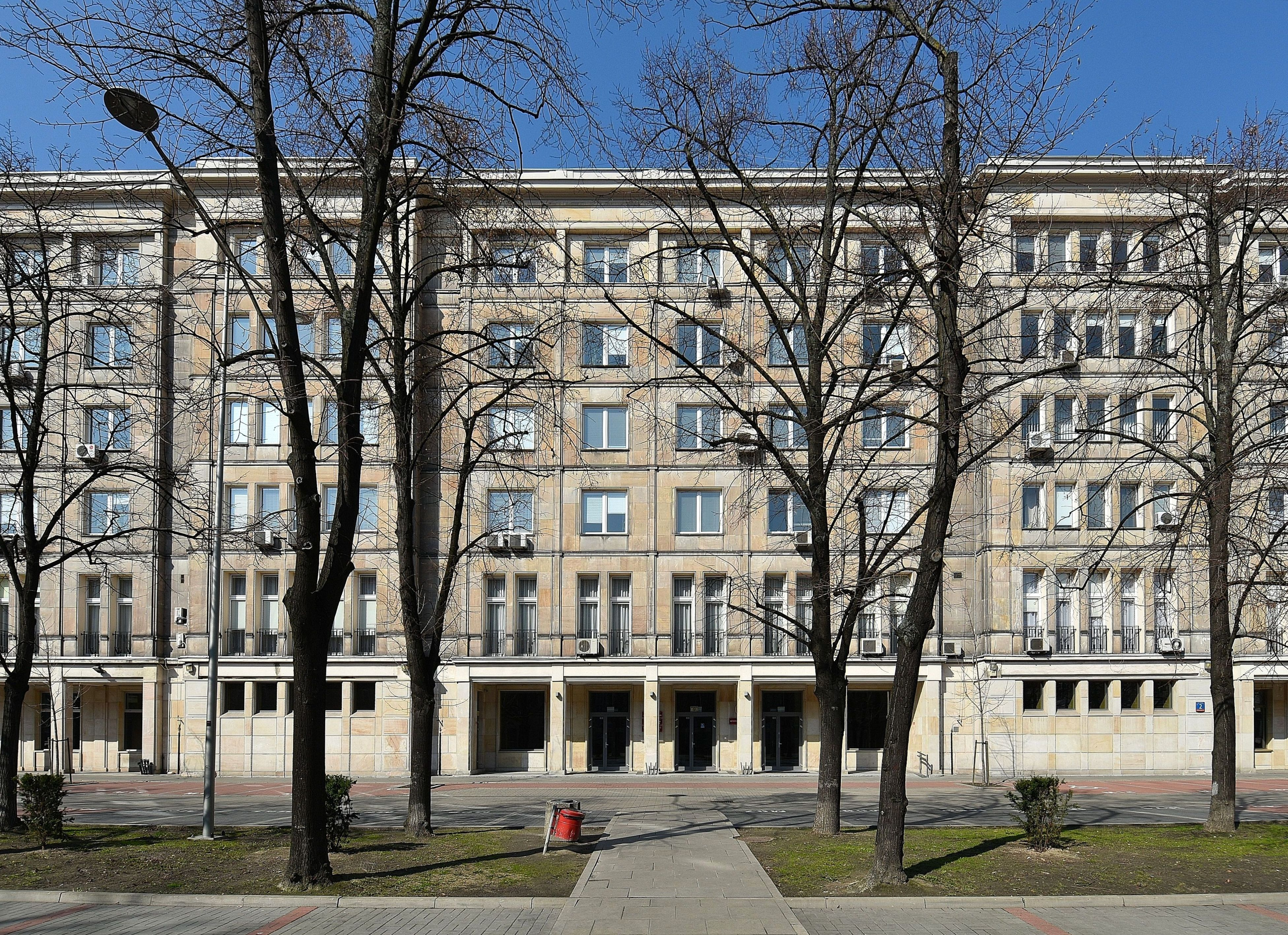

Agency overview
- Formed: 1991; 35 years ago
- Jurisdiction: Poland
- Headquarters: Warsaw
- Website: www.kombatanci.gov.pl/en/

The Office for War Veterans and Victims of Oppression (Polish: Urząd do Spraw Kombatantów i Osób Represjonowanych) in the main institution in the Government of Poland to deal with the issues of Polish veterans of struggles for independence and victims of oppression. In 1991 a special status was set up for people of these categories, and the main tasks of the Office include awarding this status, providing care for people with this status, and disseminating the information about their life and struggle.

== History ==
The predecessor of the Office for War Veterans and Victims of Oppression (UDSKiOR) during the Polish People's Republic period was the Office for Veterans' Affairs (Polish: Urząd do Spraw Kombatantów). Between 1972 and 1982, this institution operated with the status of a ministry, and from 1982 to 1987, as a central office subordinate to the Prime Minister. The head of the structure was Major General Mieczysław Grudzień, who successively held the positions of Minister for Veterans' Affairs (1972–1981), Head of the Office (1981–1982), and President of the Office (1982–1987). After the unit was dissolved, veterans' affairs were taken over by the Ministry of Labor and Social Policy.

The Office for War Veterans and Victims of Oppression was established in 1991. Initially, it was subordinate to the Prime Minister, and since 1997 to the Minister responsible for social security. The Office was led by the Head, appointed and dismissed by the Prime Minister. The Head of UDSKiOR held the title of Secretary of State, and their deputy held the title of Undersecretary of State. Following changes in May 2014, the position of Head was replaced by the Chief of UDSKiOR.

== Tasks ==
Among the specific tasks of the Office are initiatives related to promoting and preserving the traditions of the struggle for the independence and sovereignty of the Republic of Poland, as well as commemorating the victims of war and the post-war period. The Office also issues certificates to individuals granted veteran rights.

The Office also publishes a monthly magazine, Kombatant, aimed at veterans and those interested in modern history.

== See also ==
- Siberian Exiles Cross
- Honorary badge of Anti-communist activist or a person repressed for political reasons
- Council for the Protection of Struggle and Martyrdom Sites
- Institute of National Remembrance
