= List of recipients of the Order of Polonia Restituta =

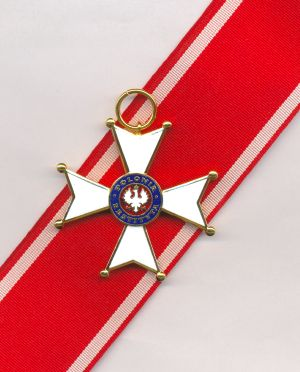
Commander's Cross of the Order of Polonia Restituta

The List of recipients of the Order of Polonia Restituta includes notable recipients of the Order of Polonia Restituta sorted by their profession.

Where possible it also lists their country of origin and order grade. People highly distinguished in more than one field have duplicate entries.

== Art ==
- Marian Konieczny — Polish sculptor
- Władysław T. Benda — Polish-American artist
- Olga Boznańska — Polish painter
- Bohdan Butenko — Polish cartoonist
- Józef Hen - Polish novelist (Commander's Cross with Star)
- Ryszard Horowitz — Polish-American photographer
- Countess Karolina Lanckorońska — Polish art historian and collector
- Kazimierz Ostrowski — Polish painter (Officer's Cross)
- Jerzy Zaruba — Polish graphic artist (Knight's Cross; Officer's Cross)
- Adam Kossowski — Polish painter and muralist
- Boleslaw Jan Czedekowski — Polish portrait painter

== Business and economics ==
- Grzegorz Kołodko — Finance Minister of Poland (Commander's Cross)
- Edward Szczepanik — Polish economist and Prime Minister of the Polish Government in Exile (Knight's Cross)
- Klemens Stefan Sielecki — Engineer and technical director of Fablok (Knight's Cross)
- Henry Hilary Chmielinski — President of the Hanover Bank and Trust (Boston, Massachusetts) and founder of the Polish Daily Courier (Boston) (Knight's Cross)
- Grzegorz Hajdarowicz — Polish entrepreneur, film producer, publisher (Knight's Cross)
- Stanisław Zybała — Polish economist, activist, and organization co-founder
- Józef Hozer — Polish professor of economics, specialising in econometrics, statistics, and real estate appraisal.

== Education ==
- Benon Bromberek — Polish educator, Professor of Pedagogical Sciences (Knight's Cross, 1977)
- Jakub Chlebowski — Polish medical educator
- Alicja Derkowska — Polish mathematician
- Maria Dobrowolska — Polish educator (Commander's Cross)
- Władysław Dworaczek — Polish educator (Knight's Cross)
- Janina Dziarnowska — writer, translator and expert of Soviet literature
- Wojciech Falkowski — Vice-Chancellor of the Polish University Abroad (2002–2011), psychiatrist, and painter (Officer's Cross)
- Helen Infeld — American-born educator (Knight's Cross)
- Lili Pohlmann — Holocaust survivor and educator (Commander's Cross)
- Anna Radziwiłł — Polish educator, Minister of Education (Commander's Cross)
- Michael Hewitt-Gleeson — Australian scholar (Officer's Cross)
- Margaret Schlauch — American scholar, naturalized Polish (Officer's Cross)
- Czesław Strumiłło — Polish scientist in the field of chemistry, founder of the theory of drying (Commander's Cross)
- Kazimierz Lisiecki — Polish educator (Officer's Cross)
- Leonard Weber — Polish educator, beekeeper
- Anna Żarnowska — Polish historian (Officer's Cross)
- Anna Sitarska Polish librarian and University Teacher
- Leon Starkiewicz — Polish teacher, founder, and long-time principal of the Municipal Gymnasium in Łódź (Knight's Cross)

== Film ==
- Józef Arkusz — Polish film director (Officer's Cross)
- Ewa Błaszczyk – Polish actress (Officer's Cross)
- Stanisław Brudny - Polish actor
- Stanisława Celińska – Polish actress, singer (Commander's Cross with Star, posthumous)
- Sylwester Chęciński — Polish film director (Grand Cross, posthumous; Commander's Cross with Star; Commander's Cross)
- Bronisław Cieślak — Polish actor, politician and journalist, member of the Sejm
- Anna Dymna — Polish actress (Commander's Cross)
- Jan Englert – Polish actor (Commander's Cross)
- Krystyna Feldman — Polish actress (Commander's Cross)
- Piotr Fronczewski — Polish actor (Officer's Cross)
- Jan Frycz – Polish actor (Officer's Cross)
- Ignacy Gogolewski — Polish actor (Commander's Cross with Star)
- Wiesław Gołas — Polish actor (Grand Cross, posthumous)
- Mikołaj Grabowski - Polish actor (Officer's Cross)
- Stefania Grodzieńska - Polish actress (Commander's Cross)
- Jerzy Gruza — Polish director (Commander's Cross, posthumous)
- Jerzy Hoffman — Polish film director (Grand Cross)
- Gustaw Holoubek — Polish actor (Knight's Cross; Commander's Cross with Star; Grand Cross)
- Krystyna Janda — Polish actress (Commander's Cross with Star)
- Alina Janowska - Polish actress (Commander's Cross with Star, Commander's Cross)
- Krzysztof Jasiński - Polish film director (Commander's Cross with Star, Commander's Cross)
- Kazimierz Kaczor — Polish actor (Grand Cross)
- Jerzy Kamas — Polish actor (Officer's Cross)
- Emilian Kamiński - Polish actor (Commander's Cross with Star, posthumous, Officer's Cross)
- Emil Karewicz — Polish actor (Commander's Cross, posthumous)
- Jerzy Kawalerowicz - Polish film director (Grand Cross)
- Jan Kobuszewski — Polish actor (Commander's Cross with Star)
- Jan Kociniak — Polish actor
- Krzysztof Kolberger — Polish actor (Commander's Cross, posthumous)
- Wiesław Komasa - Polish actor (Officer's Cross)
- Maja Komorowska — Polish actress (Grand Cross, Commander's Cross)
- Paweł Królikowski — Polish actor (Commander's Cross, posthumous)
- Irena Kwiatkowska — Polish actress (Commander's Cross with Star)
- Jan Machulski — Polish actor
- Juliusz Machulski — Polish director
- Zdzisław Maklakiewicz — Polish actor
- Janusz Morgenstern — Polish director (Commander's Cross with Star)
- Daniel Olbrychski — Polish actor (Commander's Cross)
- Marian Opania — Polish actor (Officer's Cross)
- Franciszek Pieczka — Polish actor (Grand Cross; Commander's Cross with Star)
- Wojciech Pszoniak — Polish actor (Commander's Cross)
- Andrzej Seweryn — Polish actor (Commander's Cross)
- Bohdan Smoleń — Polish actor
- Jerzy Stuhr — Polish actor (Commander's Cross with Star)
- Danuta Szaflarska - Polish actress (Grand Cross, Commander's Cross with Star)
- Jerzy Trela — Polish actor (Commander's Cross with Star; Commander's Cross)
- Jerzy Turek - Polish actor (Officer's Cross, posthumous)
- Beata Tyszkiewicz - Polish actress (Commander's Cross with Star)
- Andrzej Wajda — Polish film director (Grand Cross)
- Lidia Wysocka — Polish actress (Officer's Cross)
- Krystyna Zachwatowicz — Polish actress and costume designer (Knight's Cross)
- Stanisław Zaczyk — Polish actor
- Janusz Zakrzeński — Polish actor (Commander's Cross, posthumous)
- Krzysztof Zanussi — Polish film director (Commander's Cross with Star)
- Zbigniew Zapasiewicz — Polish actor (Grand Cross, posthumous)
- Magdalena Zawadzka — Polish actress
- Jerzy Zelnik - Polish actor

== Literature ==
- Jerzy Andrzejewski — Polish author, Ashes and Diamonds (Commander's Cross)
- Józef Białynia Chołodecki — Polish author and historian
- Ernest Bryll - Polish poet, author, translator (Commander's Cross)
- Maria Dąbrowska — Polish writer novelist and journalist
- Adam Galis — Wartime Radio Speaker, author, translator, poet, Bryły (Commander's Cross)
- Julia Hartwig - Polish poet (Grand Cross)
- Andrzej Kijowski - Polish writer (Commander's Cross)
- Janusz Korczak — Polish Jewish author and educator
- Mirosława Maria Kruszewska — Polish author, Polacy w Ameryce (Cavalier's Cross)
- Stanisław Kutrzeba — Polish author and historian
- Jan Józef Lipski — Polish author and historian (Grand Cross)
- Richard C. Lukas — American author and historian
- Józef Mackiewicz — Polish writer (Commander's Cross)
- Sławomir Mrożek - Polish writer
- Wiesław Myśliwski - Polish writer (Commander's Cross with Star)
- Hanna Ożogowska — Polish novelist and poet (Knight's Cross)
- Robert Stiller — Polish translator
- Bohdan Urbankowski - Polish poet (Commander's Cross with Star)
- Piotr S. Wandycz — Polish American author and historian
- Józef Weyssenhoff — Polish writer, novelist, poet, literary critic, publisher (Officer's Cross)
- Adam Zagajewski — Polish poet (Commander's Cross)
- Jan Andrzej Zakrzewski — Polish journalist and writer
- Andrzej Zaniewski — Polish writer, novelist, poet, songwriter (Officer's Cross)
- Antoni Matuszkiewicz — Polish poet, prose writer, playwright, journalist (Officer's Cross)

== Military ==
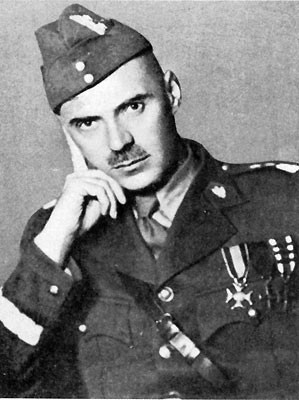
Władysław Anders

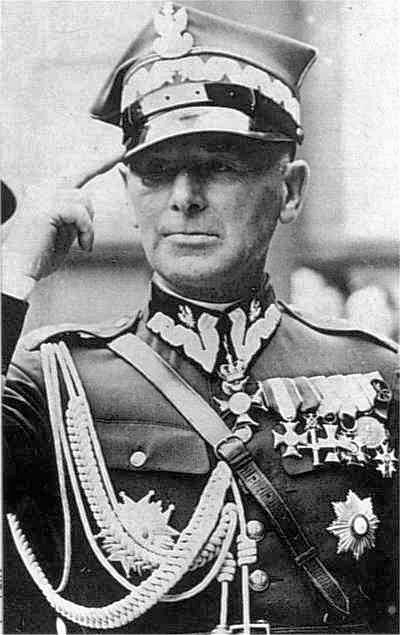
Edward Rydz-Śmigły

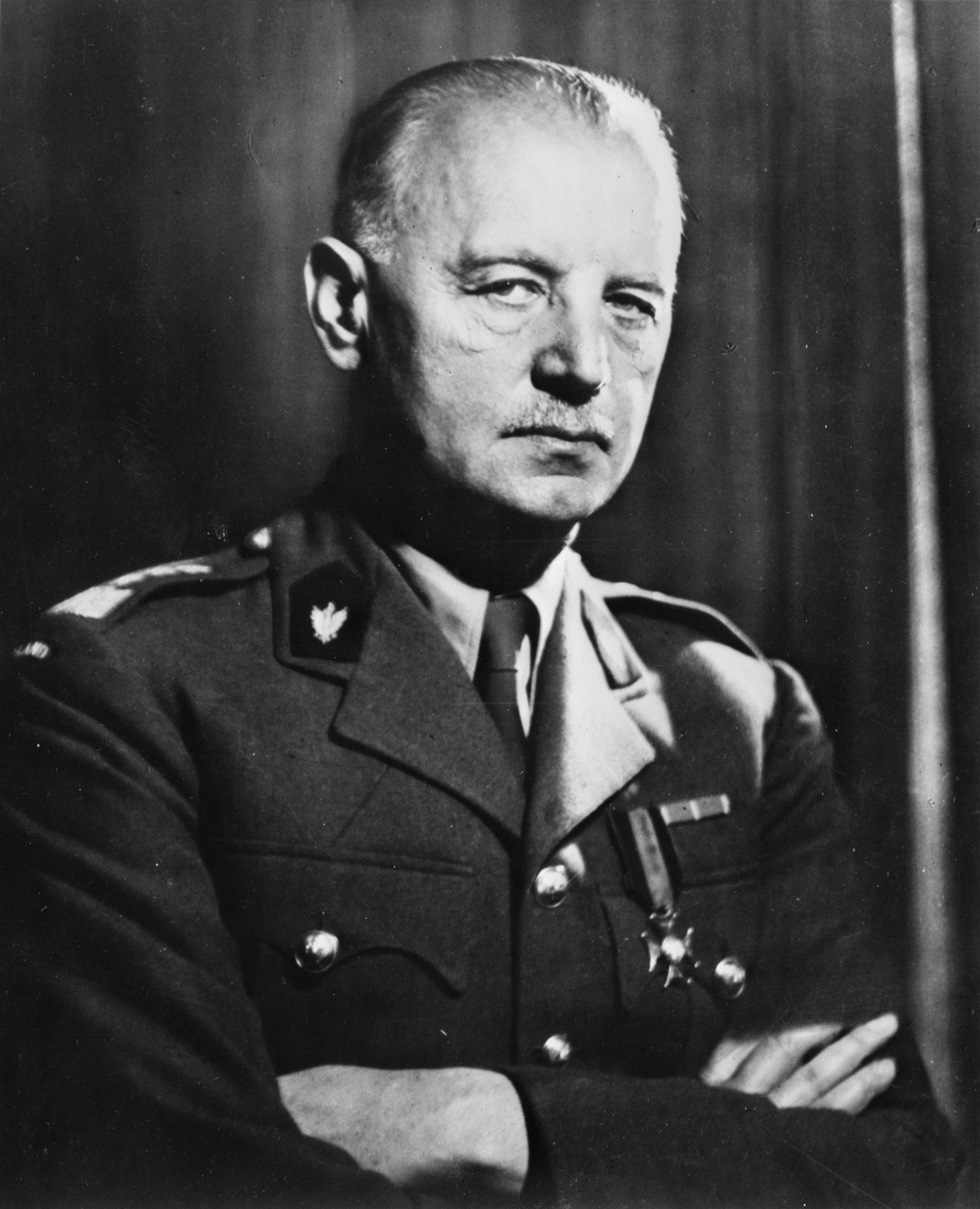
Władysław Sikorski

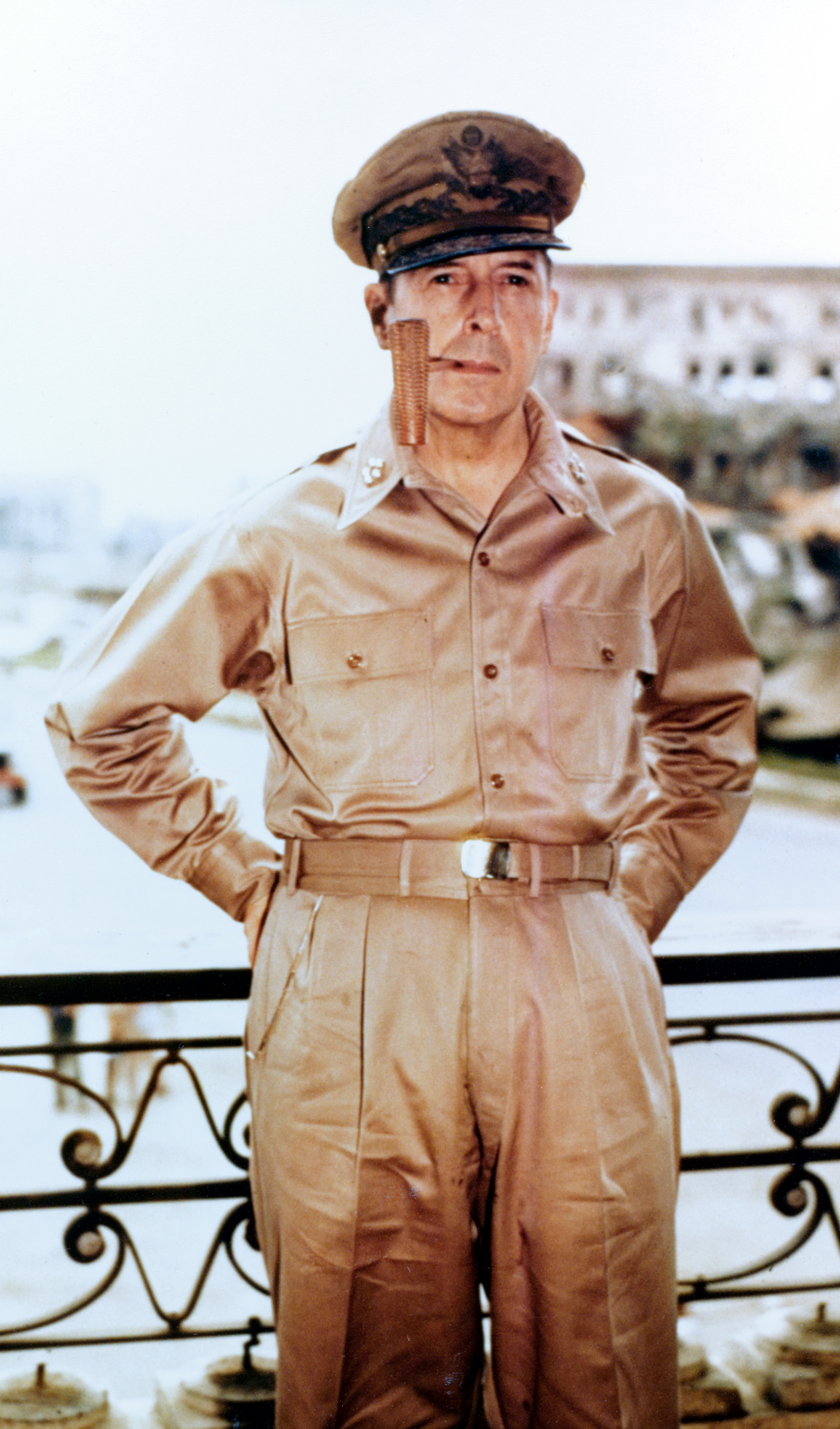
Douglas MacArthur

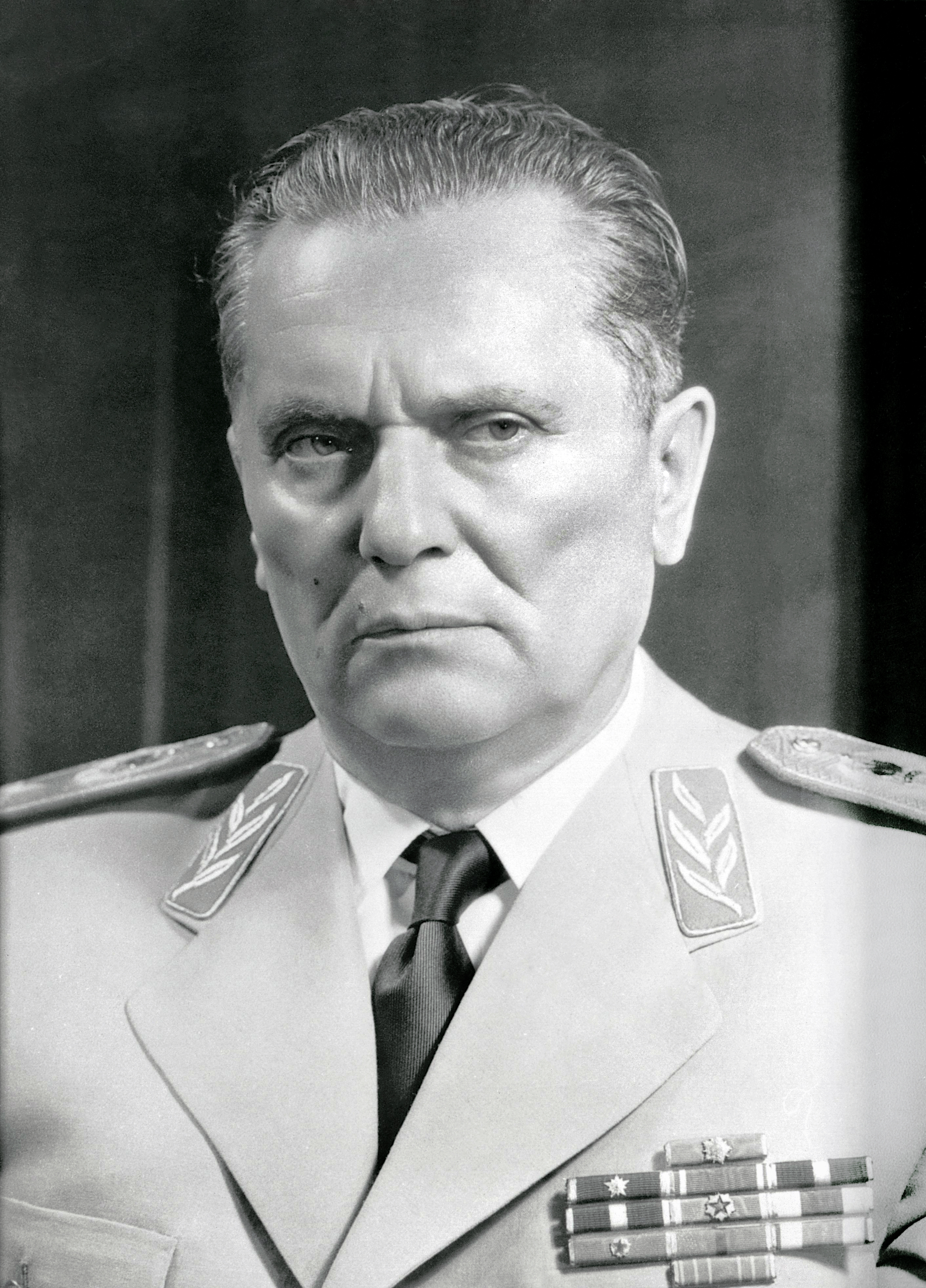
Josip Broz Tito

- Alicja Abczyńska – Polish nurse
- Stefan Bukowski — Polish Colonel (Knight's Cross)
- Franciszek Alter — Polish general
- Władysław Anders — Commander of the Polish Armed Forces in the West (Commander's Cross)
- Hamazasp Babadzhanian — Soviet-Armenian military commander
- Stefan Bałuk - Polish general (Grand Cross, posthumous)
- Tasker H. Bliss — American Chief of Staff of the U.S. Army
- Zygmunt Bohusz-Szyszko — Polish general (Officer's Cross)
- Władysław Bortnowski — Polish general (Commander's Cross; Officer's Cross)
- Omar Bradley — American General of the Army
- Leonid Brezhnev — Marshal of the Soviet Union and Soviet politician (Grand Cross)
- Tadeusz Buk - Polish general (Commander's Cross, posthumous)
- Edmund Charaszkiewicz — Polish military intelligence officer
- Antoni Chruściel — Commander of all Polish armed forces of the Warsaw Uprising (Grand Cross, posthumous)
- Frederick Edwards Collins — British admiral, commanding Gibraltar.
- Victor Crutchley — British admiral
- Hieronim Dekutowski — One of commanders of Wolnosc i Niezawislosc (Grand Cross)
- John Dill — British field marshal
- Bolesław Bronisław Duch — Polish general (Officer's Cross)
- Dwight D. Eisenhower — 34th President of the United States, Supreme Allied Commander (Chévalier, 1945)
- Franciszek Gągor — Polish general (Grand Cross, posthumous)
- Wanda Gertz — Polish resistance fighter
- Kazimierz Gilarski - Polish general (Commander's Cross, posthumous)
- William Remsburg Grove — American Colonel, for relief efforts in 1919
- Józef Haller de Hallenburg — Polish general (Commander's Cross)
- William Holmes — British general (Commander's Cross with Star)
- Wilm Hosenfeld — German officer (Commander's Cross)
- Norman Hulbert — British officer
- Ludwik Idzikowski — Polish aviator and pioneer (Officer's Cross)
- Sergěj Ingr, Minister of National Defense in the Czechoslovak government-in-exile during the Protectorate of Bohemia and Moravia (Grand Cross)
- Wacław Jędrzejewicz — Polish soldier and diplomat (Grand Cross; Officer's Cross)
- Wojciech Kania — Polish officer
- Michał Karaszewicz-Tokarzewski — Polish general and resistance fighter (Commander's Cross; Officer's Cross)
- Jan Karcz — Polish officer (Officer's Cross)
- Andrzej Karweta - Polish admiral (Commander's Cross, posthumous)
- Deryck William Kingwell — Air Commodore of the Royal Australian Air Force
- Adam Koc — Polish officer (Officer's Cross)
- Stanisław Komornicki - Polish general (Grand Cross)
- Piotr Konieczka — Polish soldier (posthumous)
- Stanisław Kopański — Polish general (Grand Cross; Officer's Cross)
- Franciszek Kornicki — Polish fighter pilot (Commander's Cross)
- Józef Kowalski — Polish supercentenarian and second-to-last veteran from the Polish-Soviet war 1919–1921
- Władysław Kozaczuk — Polish officer and historian (Knight's Cross)
- Roman Krzyżelewski — Polish admiral (Commander's Cross; Officer's Cross; Knight's Cross)
- Włodzimierz Kubala — Polish colonel, military attorney (Commander's Cross)
- Tadeusz Kutrzeba — Polish general (Commander's Cross; Knight's Cross)
- Bronisław Kwiatkowski - Polish general (Commander's Cross, posthumous)
- Witold Łokuciewski — Polish fighter ace (Commander's Cross; Knight's Cross)
- Douglas MacArthur — American Supreme Commander of the Allied Powers
- Mason MacFarlane — British Major-General, Governor of Gibraltar
- Peyton C. March — U.S. Army Chief of Staff
- Wacław Micuta — Participant in the Warsaw Uprising, UN diplomat (Commander's Cross with Star)
- Joseph T. McNarney — American general (Commander's Cross with Star)
- Martin Dunbar-Nasmith — British officer
- Adam Nieniewski — Polish officer (Officer's Cross)
- Mieczyslaw Oziewicz — RAF Warrant Officer (Commander's Cross)
- Jerzy Pajaczkowski-Dydynski — Polish officer
- Earle E. Partridge — American general
- Hubert Perring — British officer, for services to No. 303 Squadron
- Sławomir Petelicki — Polish commander of GROM (Commander's Cross; Officer's Cross)
- Witold Pilecki — Polish resistance fighter
- Stanley George Culliford — New Zealand pilot, for services during Operation Motyl
- Jadwiga Piłsudska — Polish aviator, daughter of Józef Piłsudski
- Józef Piłsudski — Prime Minister of Poland, first marshal, Chief of State
- Jan Pirog — Polish soldier (Knight's Cross)
- Ryszard Piotrowski — Polish Major, Armija Krajowa
- Ryszard Polanski — Knight's cross
- Stanisław Popławski — Polish general (Grand Cross; Commander's Cross with Star; Commander's Cross)
- Arthur John Power — British admiral
- Alexander Pokryshkin — Soviet WWII ace pilot
- Wacław Przeździecki — Polish officer (Commander's Cross)
- Władysław Raginis — Polish officer (Grand Cross)
- Emil Rauer — industrialist, creator and commander of a railway protection formation, social activist, and independence fighter
- Stefan Rowecki — Polish general (Knight's Cross)
- Wilhelm Orlik-Rueckemann — Polish general and military pioneer (Commander's Cross)
- Edward Rydz-Śmigły — Marshal of Poland
- Jan Rządkowski — Polish general
- W. A. J. Satchell — Group Captain, for outstanding services to the Polish Air Force during World War II
- Danuta Siedzikówna — Polish nurse
- Władysław Sikorski — General, Prime Minister of Poland, Prime Minister of the Polish Government in Exile
- Jan Sobczyński — Polish painter and soldier
- Stanisław Sosabowski — Polish general
- Mieczysław Stachowiak - Polish general
- Arthur Stanley-Clarke — British officer
- Włodzimierz Steyer — Polish admiral (Commander's Cross; Officer's Cross)
- Charles Pelot Summerall — American general, president of The Citadel (Grand Cross)
- Zygmunt Szendzielarz — Polish commander of the 5th Vilnian Home Army Brigade (Grand Cross)
- Stefan Sznuk — Polish general (Commander's Cross)
- Henryk Szumski — Polish general
- Antoni Szylling — Polish general
- Carl Edelhjelm — Swedish officer
- Josip Broz Tito — Marshal of Yugoslavia, Yugoslav politician (Grand Crosses, twice awarded)
- Rodoljub Čolaković — Yugoslav partisan and politician
- Tōgō Heihachirō — Japanese admiral
- Władysław Wejtko — Polish general (Commander's Cross)
- Harold Edward Whittingham — British Air Marshal (Commander's Cross with Star)
- Bolesław Wieniawa-Długoszowski — Polish general (Commander's Cross with Star)
- Ryszard Winowski — Polish colonel (Commander's Cross)
- Stanislaw Robert Wlosok-Nawarski — Polish Air Force pilot during World War II
- Józef Zając — Polish general
- Mariusz Zaruski — Polish general (Grand Cross)
- Czesław Zawilski — Polish corporal during World War II
- Georgy Zhukov — Marshal of the Soviet Union and Soviet politician (Commander's Cross with Star)

== Music ==
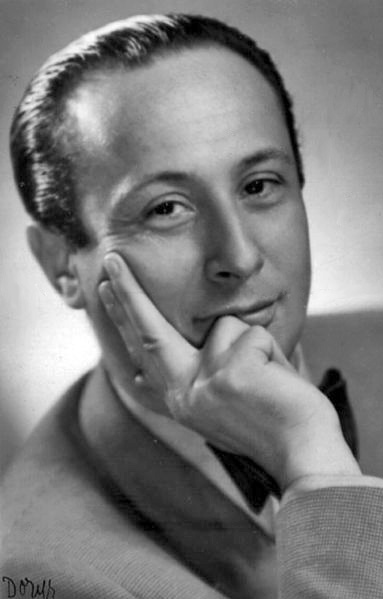
Władysław Szpilman

- Maria Baliszewska — Polish ethnomusicologist and journalist
- Ewa Bandrowska-Turska — Coloratura soprano and music educator (Officer's Cross)
- Piotr Beczała — Polish tenor
- Rafał Blechacz — Polish pianist
- Ewa Demarczyk — Polish singer (Commander's Cross with Star, Commander's Cross)
- Zbigniew Drzewiecki - Professor of piano, Warsaw Conservatory
- Halina Frąckowiak – Polish singer (Commander's Cross)
- Marek Grechuta — Polish singer (Commander's Cross)
- Jan Hoffman — Polish pianist and music educator (Officer and Commander's Cross with Star)
- Maciej Jaskiewicz — Polish-Canadian conductor
- Wojciech Karolak — Polish musician (Knight's Cross)
- Wojciech Kilar — Polish composer (Grand Cross, Commander's Cross with Star)
- Wladimir Jan Kochanski — Polish-American pianist
- Maria Koterbska — Polish singer
- Sławomir Kowalewski — Polish musician and singer
- Krzysztof Krawczyk — Polish musician and singer
- Marian Lichtman — Polish musician and singer
- Zofia Lissa — Polish musicologist (Knight's Cross)
- Jerzy Matuszkiewicz — Polish music composer (Commander's Cross)
- Wojciech Młynarski — Polish poet and singer (Commander's Cross)
- Włodzimierz Nahorny — Polish musician
- Tadeusz Nalepa — Polish composer and guitarist
- Jan Pietrzak — Polish singer, actor (Grand Cross, Commander's Cross)
- Jerzy Połomski — Polish singer
- Krystyna Prońko – Polish singer (Officer's Cross)
- Łucja Prus – Polish singer (Knight's Cross)
- Andrzej Rozbicki — Polish conductor
- Arthur Rubinstein — Polish-American Jewish pianist (Knight's Cross)
- Tomasz Stańko — Polish jazzman
- Władysław Szpilman — Polish-Jewish composer and pianist, protagonist of The Pianist (Commander's Cross)
- Robert Szreder — Polish violinist
- Antoinette Szumowska — Polish pianist, for relief efforts in 1920, awarded by Ignacy Jan Paderewski (Officer's Cross)
- Zygmunt Szweykowski – Polish musicologist
- Stanisław Wisłocki — Polish pianist and conductor
- Zbigniew Wodecki — Polish musician, singer and composer
- Jan Wróblewski – Polish jazz musician
- Krystian Zimerman — Polish pianist (Commander's Cross with Star)
- Teresa Żylis-Gara — Polish opera singer

== Politics ==
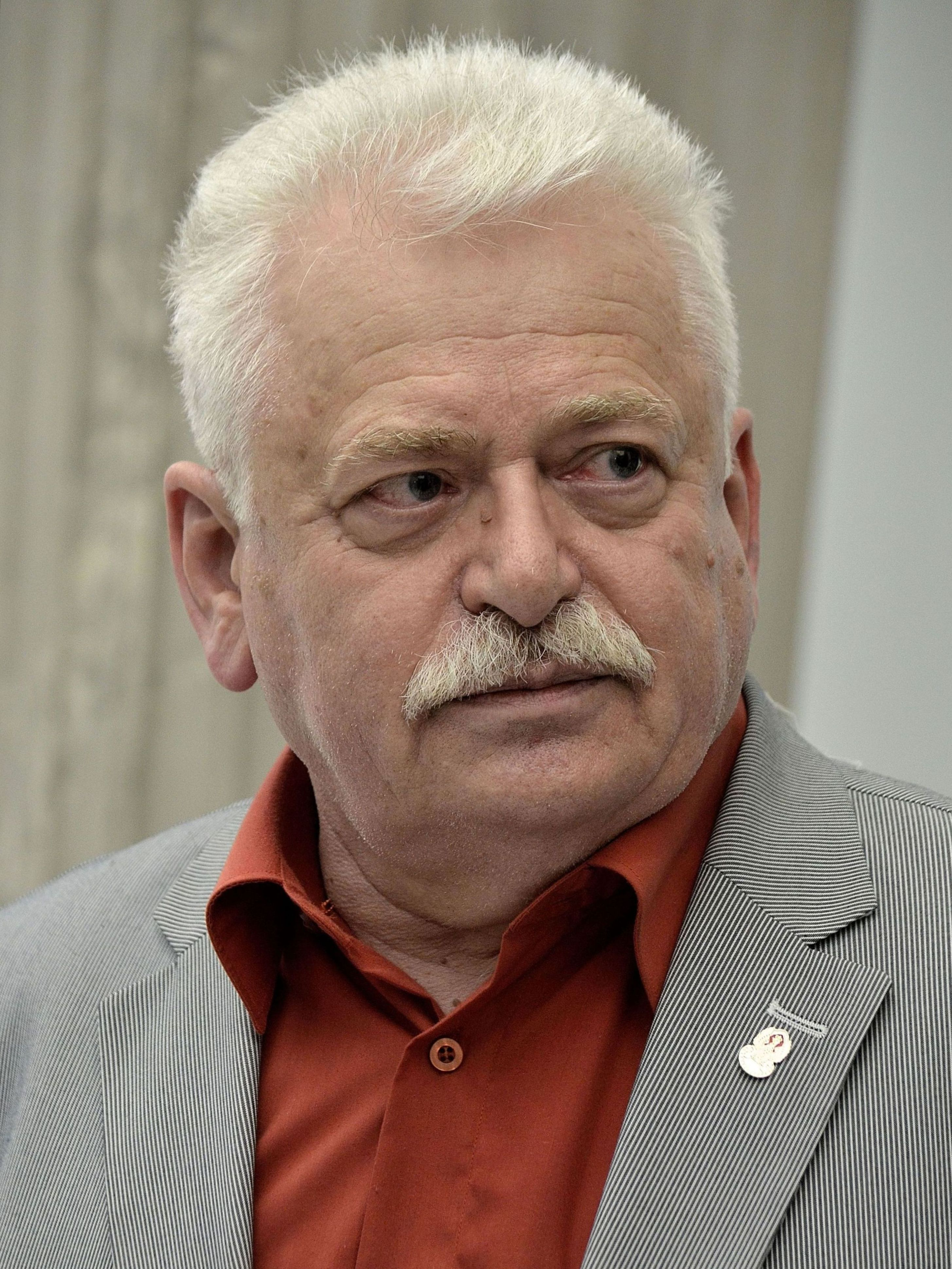
Romuald Szeremietiew

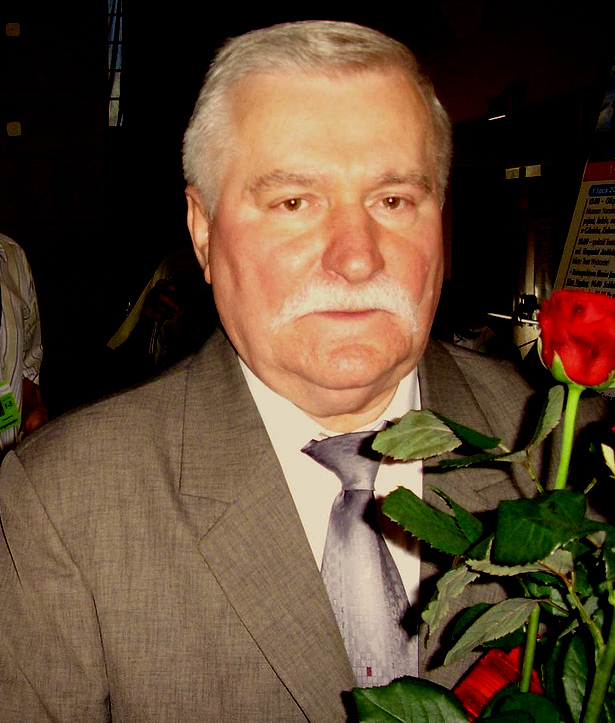
Lech Wałęsa

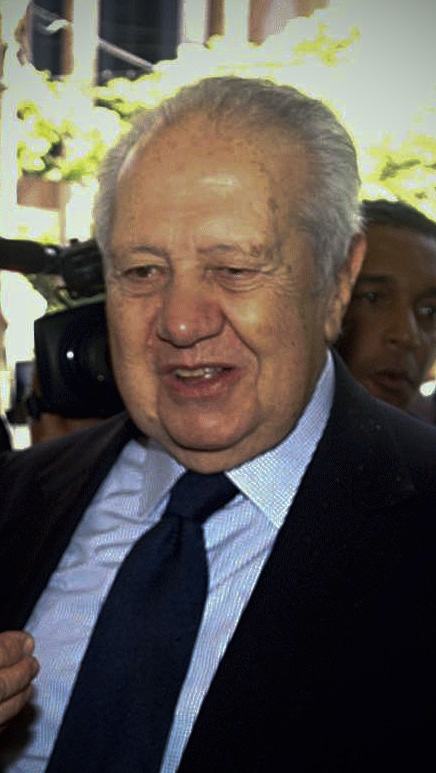
Mário Soares

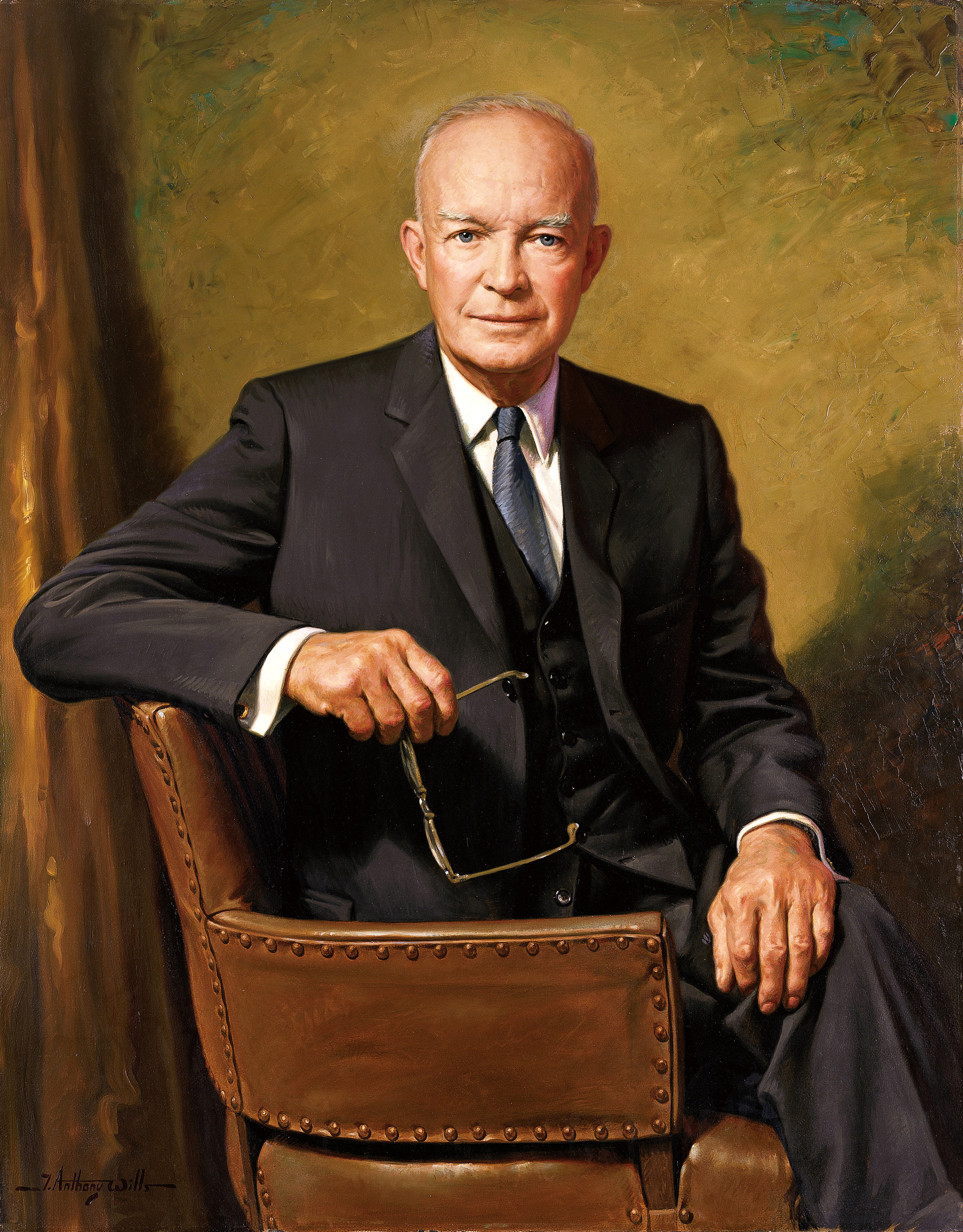
Dwight D. Eisenhower

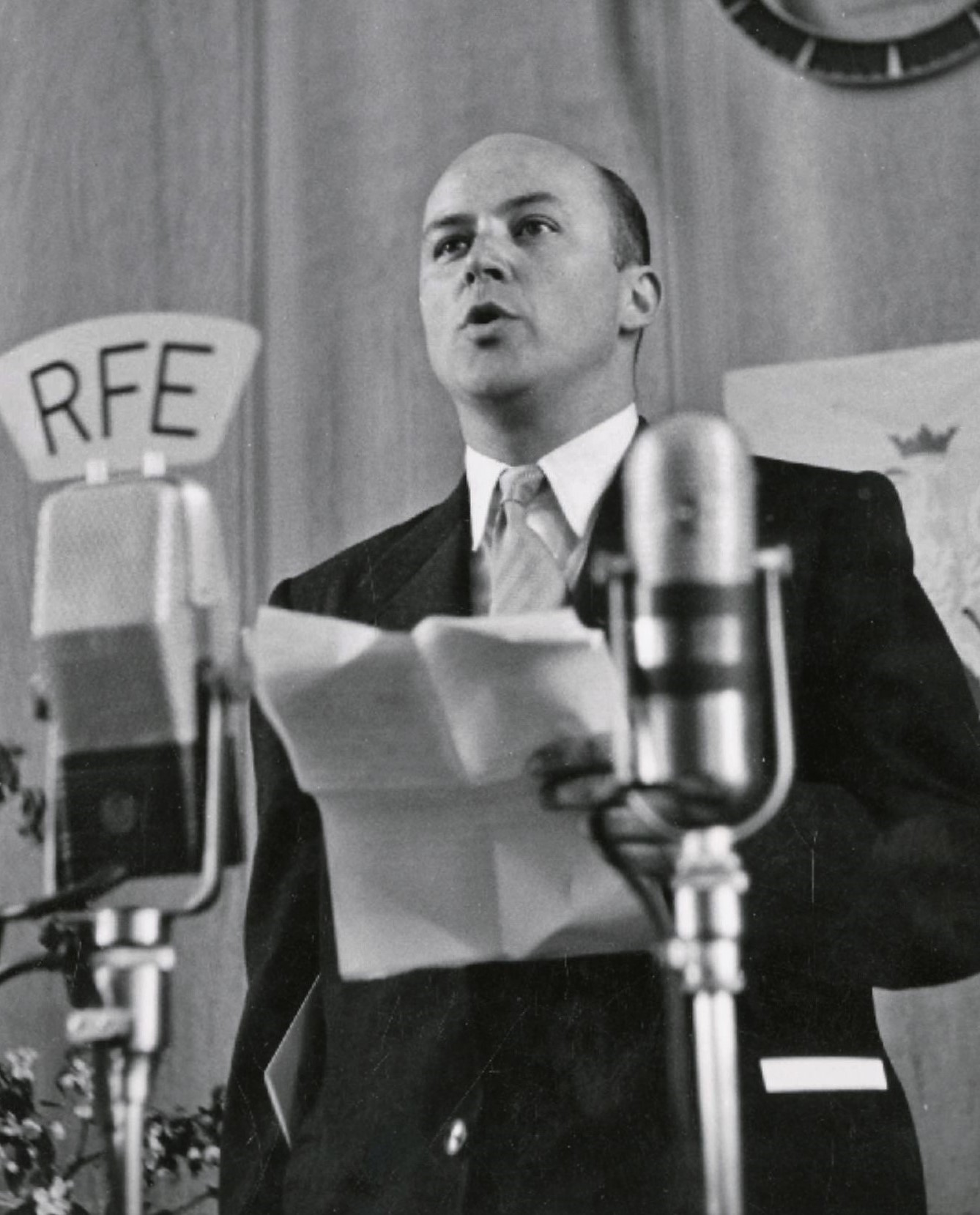
Jan Nowak-Jeziorański

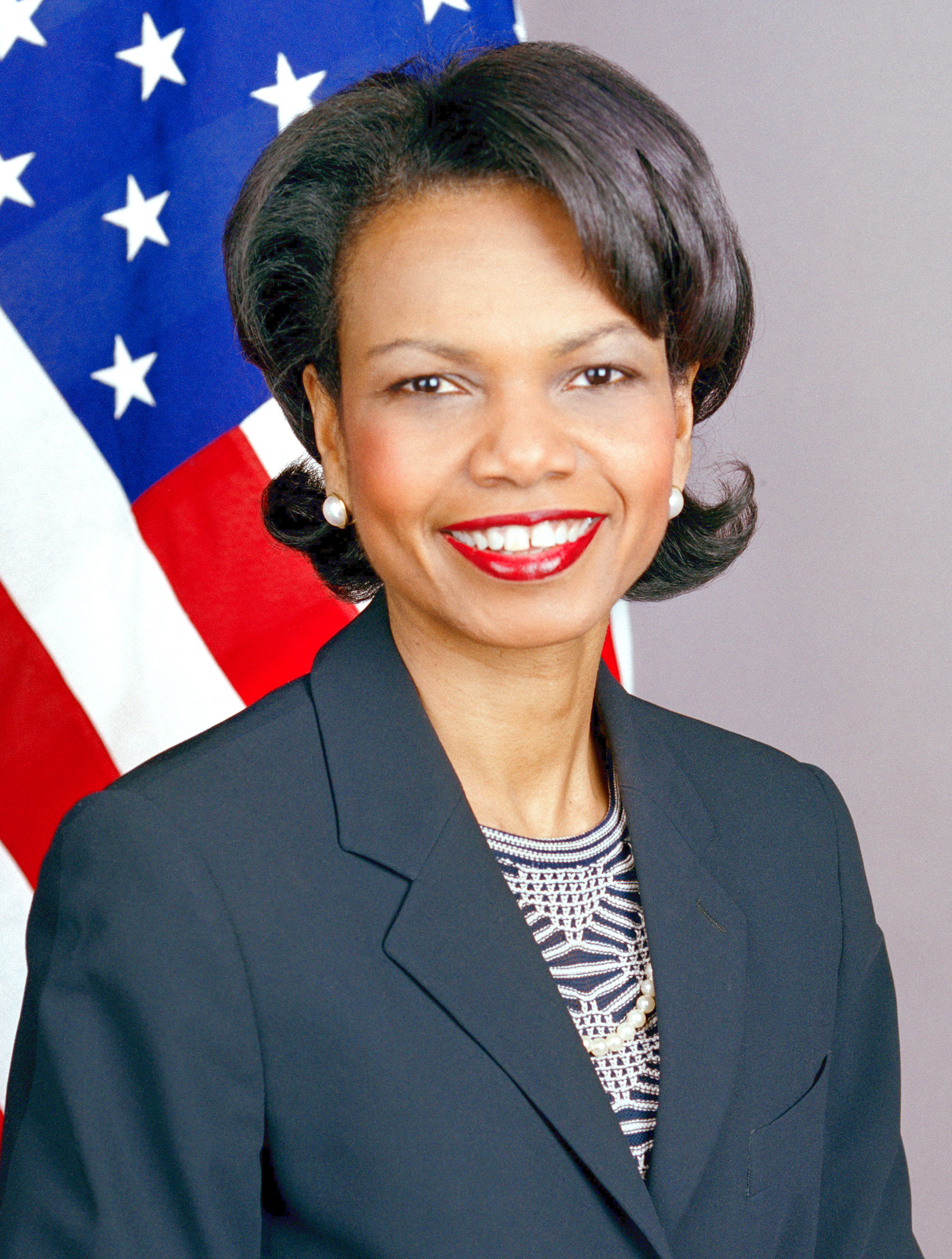
Condoleezza Rice

- Paweł Adamowicz - Polish lawyer, local government official, politician
- Edward Lisiowski - Mayor of Wojszyn (Knights cross) 1983
- Władysław Bartoszewski — Minister of Foreign Affairs of the Republic of Poland (Commander's Cross with Star)
- Józefa Bramowska — Polish politician
- Edvard Beneš — Foreign Minister of Czechoslovakia, 1925
- Leonid Brezhnev — Marshal of the Soviet Union and Soviet politician (Grand Cross)
- Krystyna Bochenek — Polish politician and journalist (Commander's Cross with Star)
- Adam Bromke — Professor of International Affairs, statesman (Grand Cross)
- Andrzej Butkiewicz — Political activist and co-founder of the Student Solidarity Committee (Knight's Cross)
- Andrzej Byrt — Polish diplomat (Officer's Cross; Commander's Cross)
- Wiesław Chrzanowski - Polish lawyer, politician, member of the Sejm, Marshal of the Sejm (Grand Cross)
- Andrzej Czuma — Minister of Justice of the Republic of Poland
- Leszek Deptuła — Polish politician, member of the Sejm (Commander's Cross, posthumous)
- Grzegorz Dolniak — Polish politician, member of the Sejm
- Waldemar Dubaniowski — Polish diplomat, civil servant, secretary of state and Chief of the Cabinet of the President of Poland
- Dwight D. Eisenhower — President of the United States of America, Supreme Allied Commander (Chévalier, 1945)
- Zhou Enlai — Premier of the People's Republic of China (Grand Cross, 1954)
- Osvaldo Dorticos — President of Cuba (Grand Cross, 1973)
- Fidel Castro — Prime Minister of Cuba (Grand Cross, 1973)
- János Esterházy — Most prominent ethnic Hungarian politician in former Czechoslovakia
- Jolanta Fedak — Polish politician, member of the Sejm
- Tadeusz Ferenc — Polish politician (Grand Cross, Commander's Cross with Star, Commander's Cross)
- Grażyna Gęsicka — Polish politician, member of the Sejm
- Mieczysław Gil — Polish politician, member of the Sejm
- Zyta Gilowska — Polish economist and politician
- Henryk Goryszewski - Polish politician, member of the Sejm
- Przemysław Gosiewski — Polish politician, member of the Sejm
- Hanna Gronkiewicz-Waltz – Polish politician (Commander's Cross with Star)
- Bernard Hausner — Polish diplomat and member of the Sejm
- Izabela Jaruga-Nowacka — Polish politician, member of the Sejm
- Henryk Józewski — Polish artist and politician
- Marek Jurek — Polish politician, member of the Sejm, Marshal of the Sejm (Commander's Cross)
- Mariusz Kamiński — Polish politician, head of the Central Anticorruption Bureau (Commander's Cross)
- Sebastian Karpiniuk — Polish politician
- Teresa Klimek — Co-founder of the local branch of the Catholic Intellectuals Club and executive on the regional branch of Solidarity (Knight's Cross)
- Leo Krzycki — Polish-American unionist and activist, awarded by Bolesław Bierut (1946)
- Jerzy Kulczycki - Polish publisher and bookseller in London
- Jan Kułakowski — Polish politician, member of the European Parliament (Commander's Cross with Star)
- Andrzej Kern — Polish politician and lawyer, member of the Sejm
- John Lesinski Sr. — American congressman
- Łukasz Litewka — Polish politician, member of the Sejm (Officer's Cross, awarded posthumously)
- Jan Lityński — Polish politician, member of the Sejm
- Aleksander Małachowski - Polish politician (Grand Cross)
- Léon Noël — French ambassador and politician (Grand Cross)
- Jan Nowak-Jeziorański — Polish resistance fighter and activist, Radio Free Europe
- Piotr Nowina-Konopka — Polish politician (Officer's Cross)
- Alvin E. O'Konski — American member of Congress
- Józef Oleksy - Polish politician, Prime Minister of Poland (Grand Cross, posthumous)
- Andrzej Ostoja-Owsiany - Polish politician, member of the Sejm (Commander's Cross)
- Alvin M. Owsley — American politician
- Andrzej Papierz — Polish diplomat
- Józef Piłsudski — Prime Minister of Poland, first marshal, Chief of State
- Adam Piłsudski — Polish senator
- Walerian Piotrowski - Polish lawyer (Grand Cross)
- Krzysztof Putra — Polish politician, member of the Sejm and a senator
- Condoleezza Rice — 66th US Secretary of State, stateswoman
- Marek Rocki — Polish econometrist and politician (Knight's Cross)
- Jan Rulewski — Polish politician, activist of solidarity, member of the Sejm (1991–2001) and a senator (Grand Cross, Commander's Cross)
- Arkadiusz Rybicki — Polish politician, member of the Sejm
- Ryszard Musielak — Activist of solidarity (Commander's Cross)
- Józef Oleksy — Polish politician, member of the Sejm
- Maciej Płażyński — Polish politician (Grand Cross, posthumous)
- Michał Seweryński — Polish Minister of Science and Higher Education (Knight's Cross)
- Władysław Sikorski — General, Prime Minister of Poland, Prime Minister of the Polish Government in Exile
- Mário Soares — Prime Minister and President of Portugal
- Władysław Stasiak — Polish senior official and politician
- Edward Szczepanik — Polish economist and Prime Minister of the Polish Government in Exile (Knight's Cross)
- Aleksander Szczygło — Polish politician, member of the Sejm
- Jolanta Szczypińska — Polish politician, member of the Sejm
- Romuald Szeremietiew - Polish independence fighter and former Minister of National Defense (1992) (Knight's Cross, Commander's Cross)
- Jerzy Szmajdziński — Polish politician, member of the Sejm
- Jolanta Szymanek-Deresz — Polish lawyer, politician, member of the Sejm
- Adam Szostkiewicz — Polish author and journalist (Officer's Cross)
- Josip Broz Tito — Marshal of Yugoslavia, Yugoslav politician (Grand Crosses, twice awarded)
- Izabela Tomaszewska — Polish director of protocol
- Lech Wałęsa — President of Poland, Nobel Peace Prize winner (Knight's Cross)
- Zbigniew Wassermann — Polish politician, member of the Sejm
- Wiesław Woda — Polish politician, member of the Sejm
- Edward Wojtas — Polish politician, member of the Sejm
- Henryk Wujec — Polish politician, member of the Sejm
- Stanisław Zając — Polish politician and lawyer
- Piotr Paweł Morta — Polish political activist, economist, activist in underground "Solidarity" (Officer's Cross)
- Paweł Kempka — Polish lawyer, national activist, and local government official

== Religion ==
- Stanisław Dziwisz — Polish Catholic Cardinal (Grand Cross)
- Edward Frankowski — Polish Catholic Bishop (Grand Cross)
- Sławoj Leszek Głódź — Polish Catholic Archbishop (Commander's Cross with Star)
- Andrzeja Górska — Polish nun (Commander's Cross)
- Zenon Grocholewski — Polish Catholic Cardinal (Commander's Cross with Star)
- Roman Indrzejczyk - Polish priest (Commander's Cross with Star)
- Tadeusz Isakowicz-Zaleski — Polish priest (Commander's Cross)
- Marian Jaworski — Polish Catholic Cardinal
- Ignacy Jeż — Polish Catholic Bishop (Grand Cross)
- Michał Józefczyk — Polish priest
- Józef Kowalczyk — Polish Archbishop (Grand Cross)
- Adam Kozłowiecki — Polish Catholic Cardinal (Grand Cross)
- Wojciech Lemański — Polish priest
- Franciszek Macharski — Polish Catholic Cardinal, Archbishop of Kraków (Grand Cross)
- Henryk Muszyński — Polish Archbishop (Grand Cross)
- James J. Norris — European Director, War Relief Services, National Catholic Welfare Conference (USA); assisted In resettlement of thousands of Polish refugees in Post-World War II era. (Knight Commander, 20 July 1949).
- Tadeusz Pieronek — Polish Bishop (Grand Cross)
- Tadeusz Płoski — Polish Catholic Bishop (Commander's Cross)
- Jan Sikorski - Polish priest (Grand Cross)
- Lawrence Wnuk — Polish priest

== Royalty ==
- Adam Karol Czartoryski — Polish prince
- Amha Selassie of Ethiopia — Last emperor of Ethiopia
- Haile Selassie I of Ethiopia — Emperor of Ethiopia
- Mohammad Reza Pahlavi — Shah of Iran

== Science and engineering ==
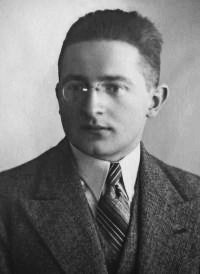
Marian Rejewski

- Ryszard Bartel — Polish aviation pioneer (Knight's Cross)
- Gerard Ciołek — Polish architect and historian of parks and gardens (Knight's Cross)
- Seweryn Chajtman — Polish scientist, engineer, teacher of the Industrial Management (Commander's Cross)
- Jan Chodorowski — Polish materials science engineer (Officer's Cross)
- Tadeusz Chyliński — Polish airplane constructor (Knight's Cross)
- Ewa Damek — Polish mathematician (Knight's Cross)
- Artur Ekert - British–Polish quantum physicist (Commander's Cross)
- Ryszard Jurkowski — Polish architect and urban planner (Officer's Cross)
- Zbigniew Kabata — Polish parasitologist (Grand Cross)
- Krzysztof Kazimierz Miller— Polish architect and urbanist (Knight's Cross)
- Stanisław Mrozowski — Polish-American physicist
- Jan Nagórski — Polish aviation pioneer
- Marian Rejewski — Polish mathematician, breaker of the Enigma cipher (Grand Cross)
- Zbigniew Religa - Polish cardiac surgeon (Grand Cross)
- Tadeusz Sendzimir — Polish-American inventor (Officer's Cross)
- Czesław Strumiłło — Professor of Chemical and Process Engineering (Commander's Cross)
- Mirosław Vitali — Polish prosthetics pioneer
- Kazimierz Żorawski — Polish mathematician (Commander's Cross)
- Halina Leszczynska— Professor of Chemistry (Officer's Cross)
- Czeslaw Olech — Polish mathematician (Commander's Cross)
- Aniela Chałubińska — Polish geographer and geologist
- Andrzej Chmielewski — Professor of Chemistry (Officer's Cross)
- Marek Jan Sadowski — Professor of Physics (Officer's Cross)
- Zdzisław Skupień — Polish mathematician (Knight's Cross)
- Roman Antoszewski — Polish plant physiologist (Knight's Cross)
- Witold Abramowicz — Polish scientist, professor of economics (Knight's Cross)
- Marcin Kacprzak — Polish doctor, educator, pedagogue, publicist, pioneer of social medicine
- Władysław Tryliński — Polish engineer and inventor (Officer's Cross, 1923)
- Michał Gryziński — Polish nuclear physicist (Chevalier's Cross)
- Andrzej Zakrzewski - Polish historian, lawyer, politician (Grand Cross)
- Marian Zembala - Polish cardiac surgeon (Commander's Cross)

== Sport ==
- Leo Beenhakker — Dutch football trainer — Poland national football team coach (Officer's Cross)
- Jakub Błaszczykowski — Polish football player (Commander's Cross)
- Zbigniew Boniek — Polish football player
- Marek Cieślak — Polish speedway rider (Knight's Cross)
- Gerard Cieślik - Polish football player (Commander's Cross)
- Czesław Cybulski — Polish athletics coach (Commander's Cross)
- Mariusz Czerkawski — Polish ice hockey player
- Adela Dankowska — Polish glider pilot
- Kazimierz Deyna — Polish football player
- Małgorzata Dydek — Polish basketball player
- Wojciech Fortuna — Polish ski jumper
- Kazimierz Górski — Polish football coach (Grand Cross, posthumous; Commander's Cross with Star; Commander's Cross)
- Marek Karbarz – Polish volleyball player (Knight's Cross)
- Marian Kasprzyk - Polish boxer (Commander's Cross)
- Ewa Kłobukowska - Polish athletic (Commander's Cross)
- Robert Korzeniowski - Polish racewalker (Commander's Cross)
- Justyna Kowalczyk - Polish cross-country skier (Commander's Cross with Star)
- Jerzy Kulej - Polish boxer (Commander's Cross)
- Bartosz Kurek – Polish volleyball player (Commander's Cross)
- Wacław Kuźmicki — Polish decathlete (Knight's Cross)
- Czesław Lang — Polish cyclist
- Grzegorz Lato — Polish football player
- Waldemar Legień — Polish judoka (Officer's Cross)
- Maciej Lepiato – Polish wheelchair fencer (Officer's Cross)
- Robert Lewandowski — Polish football player (Commander's Cross)
- Włodzimierz Lubański — Polish football player
- Agata Mróz-Olszewska — Polish volleyball player (posthumous, not accepted by her husband)
- Pelagia Majewska — Polish glider pilot
- Adam Małysz — Polish ski jumper (Officer's Cross; Commander's Cross, Commander's Cross with Star)
- Natalia Partyka — Polish table tennis player (Commander's Cross with Star, Knight's Cross; Officer's Cross)
- Wiesław Radomski – Polish volleyball player (Knight's Cross)
- Katarzyna Rogowiec — Polish paralympian
- Edward Skorek – Polish volleyball player (Officer's Cross)
- Alfred Smoczyk — Polish speedway rider (Officer's Cross)
- Włodzimierz Smolarek — Polish football player (Officer's Cross posthumous)
- Kamil Stoch — Polish ski jumper (Officer's Cross)
- Irena Szewińska — Polish athletic (Grand Cross, Commander's Cross with Star)
- Ryszard Szurkowski — Polish cyclist (Grand Cross, posthumous, Commander's Cross with Star)
- Antoni Szymanowski — Polish football player
- Tomasz Świątek — Polish rower (Officer's Cross)
- Denis Urubko — Russian-Polish alpinist
- Bogdan Wenta — Polish handball player
- Rafał Wilk – Polish Paralympic handcyclist, speedway rider (Officer's Cross)
- Anita Włodarczyk — Polish athletic (Commander's Cross with Star)
- Adam Wójcik — Polish basketball player
- Tomasz Wójtowicz – Polish volleyball player (Commander's Cross)
- Teresa Zarzeczańska-Różańska - Polish swimmer
- Piotr Żyła - Polish ski jumper

== Other ==
- Fernand Auberjonois — Swiss-American journalist
- Irena Anders — Polish actress, widow of General Władysław Anders (Commander's Cross)
- Jerzy Bahr — Polish diplomat
- Edmund Baranowski — Warsaw insurgent (Commander's Cross with Star)
- Stanisław Bednarek — RAF aircraft engineer, "for his work dedicated to end the war and contribution to democracy" (2022)
- Zygmunt Broniarek - Polish journalist (Commander's Cross with Star)
- Helena Cehak-Holubowiczowa – Polish archaeologist
- Olga Drahonowska-Małkowska — Founder of scouting in Poland
- Jadwiga Falkowska — Activist
- Stefan Franczak (pl:Stefan Franczak) — Jesuit monk, clematis breeder (Commander's Cross, 2009)
- Zbigniew Galperyn — Warsaw insurgent
- Mirosław Hermaszewski — Polish cosmonaut, fighter plane pilot, and Polish Air Force officer (Commander's Cross)
- Mieczysław Hertz — Polish merchant, historian, writer
- Jerzy Jachowicz — Polish journalist (Commander's Cross)
- Anna Jakubowska — Warsaw insurgent
- Karolina Kaczorowska — Widow of Ryszard Kaczorowski, the last President of the Republic of Poland in exile (Commander's Cross)
- Andrzej Tadeusz Kijowski — Journalist and writer (Commander's Cross)
- Anna Kurek — Member of the Polish resistance during the Warsaw Uprising
- Lucjan Kydryński — Journalist and writer
- Tomasz Lis - Polish journalist
- Eugeniusz Lokajski — Warsaw insurgent
- Franciszek Malinowski — Journalist (Officer's Cross)
- Jacek Maziarski — Polish journalist and politician (Commander's Cross)
- Marie Mattingly Meloney — U.S. journalist who raised $1 million to buy radium for Marie Curie's laboratory
- Edward Miszczak - Polish journalist
- Maciej Orłoś — Polish journalist
- Edwin B. Parker – American diplomat and arbiter
- Simcha Rotem — Fighter in the 1943 Warsaw Ghetto Uprising (Grand Cross)
- Maciej Rybiński — Polish publicist
- Irena Sendler — Polish humanitarian who saved the lives of 2,500 Jewish children in the Warsaw Ghetto during World War II (Commander's Cross with Star)
- Ryszard Siwiec — Protester
- Krzysztof Skowroński - Polish journalist
- Reinhold Smyczek — Polish émigré activist, "for the work dedicated to independence and national treasure"
- Damian Soból - Polish volunteer
- Włodzimierz Szaranowicz — Polish sport commentator
- Zbigniew Ścibor-Rylski — Warsaw insurgent (Grand Cross, Commander's Cross with Star)
- Ludwika Wawrzyńska — Hero (Commander's Cross)
- Simon Wiesenthal — Austrian Jewish "Nazi-hunter"
- Tadeusz Wrona — Pilot
- Sugihara Chiune — Japanese vice consul in Lithuania during World War II
- Foster Furcolo — American politician involved in international investigation of Katyn massacre
- Emilia Napieralska, president of the Polish Women's Alliance of America
- Anna Sabbat — Widow of Kazimierz Sabbat, President of the Republic of Poland in exile (Commander's Cross)
- Adam Strzembosz - Polish lawyer (Grand Cross)
- Anna Stupnicka-Bando — Helped Jews in World War II (2008)
- Dariusz Szpakowski — Polish sport commentator
- Eugeniusz Szyfner — Helped Jews in World War II (2016)
- Bohdan Tomaszewski — Polish sport commentator (Commander's Cross)
- Anna Walentynowicz - Polish social activist
- Bogusław Wołoszański — Polish journalist, politician, member of the Sejm
- Paweł Zarzeczny - Polish journalist
- Wiesław Józef Sporyszkiewicz — Polish trade unionist and political activist affiliated with the Solidarity movement
