= Franczak =

Franczak is a Polish surname. Notable people include:

- Fran Franczak (born 2007), Polish footballer
- Józef Franczak (1918–1963), Polish Army and resistance soldier
- Liz Franczak, co-host of the TrueAnon podcast
- Paweł Franczak (born 1991), Polish cyclist
- Stefan Franczak (1917–2009), Polish horticulturist
