= Radio Wnet =

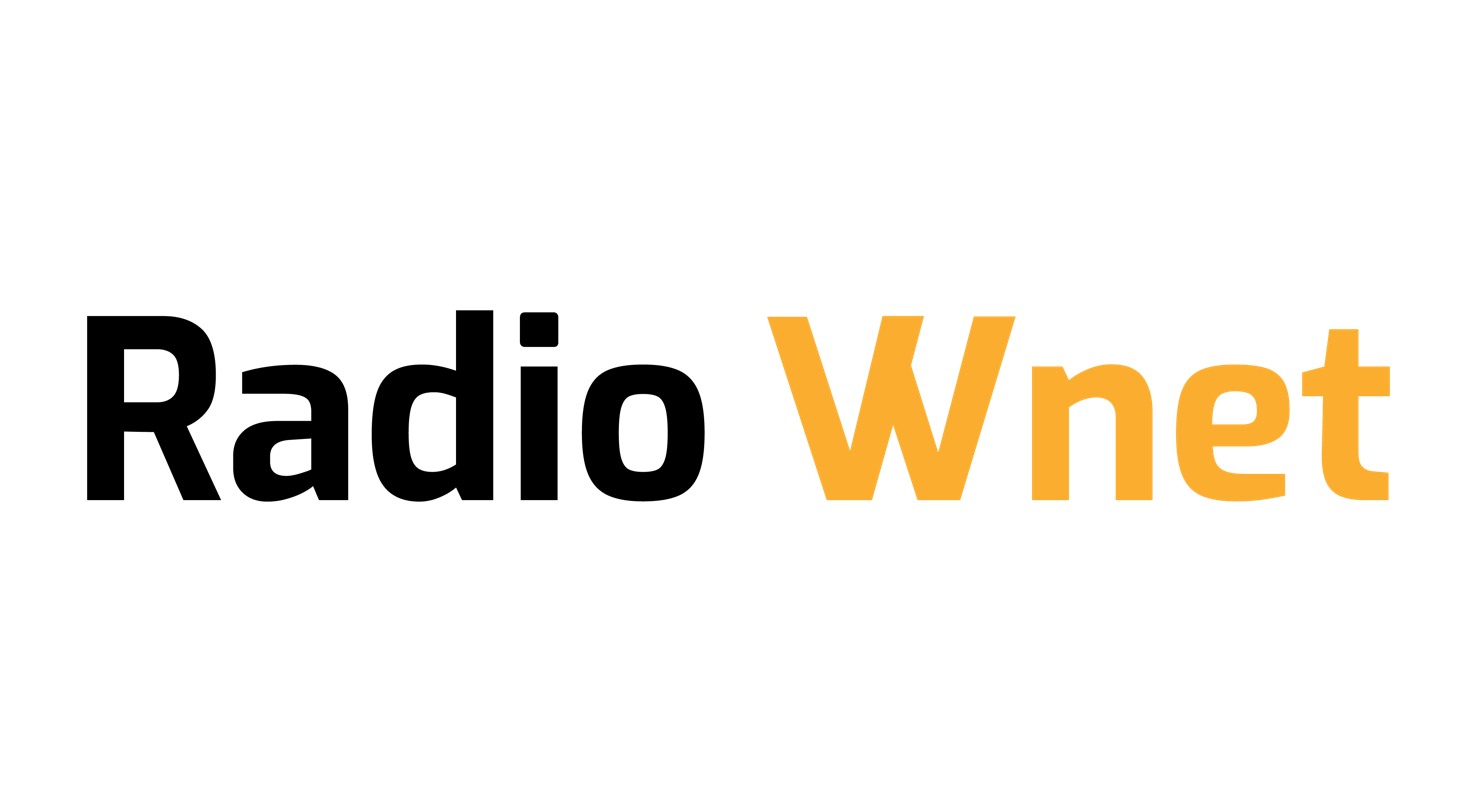
- Warsaw; Poland
- Broadcast area: Poland, broadcasts nationally
- Frequencies: 87.8 MHz (Warsaw); 95.2 MHz (Krakow); 96.8 MHz (Wroclaw)

Programming
- Language: Polish

Ownership
- Owner: Radio Wnet Sp. z.o.o.

History
- First air date: May 20, 2009 (on internet); October 16, 2018 (on FM frequency)

Links
- Website: www.wnet.fm(Polish redaction) www.radiounet.fm(Belarusian redaction)

Radio Wnet is a Polish radio station and online social networking site, founded in 2009 by Krzysztof Skowroński, Grzegorz Wasowski, Katarzyna Adamiak-Sroczyńska, Monika Makowska-Wasowska, Wojciech Cejrowski and Jerzy Jachowicz.

== Authors ==
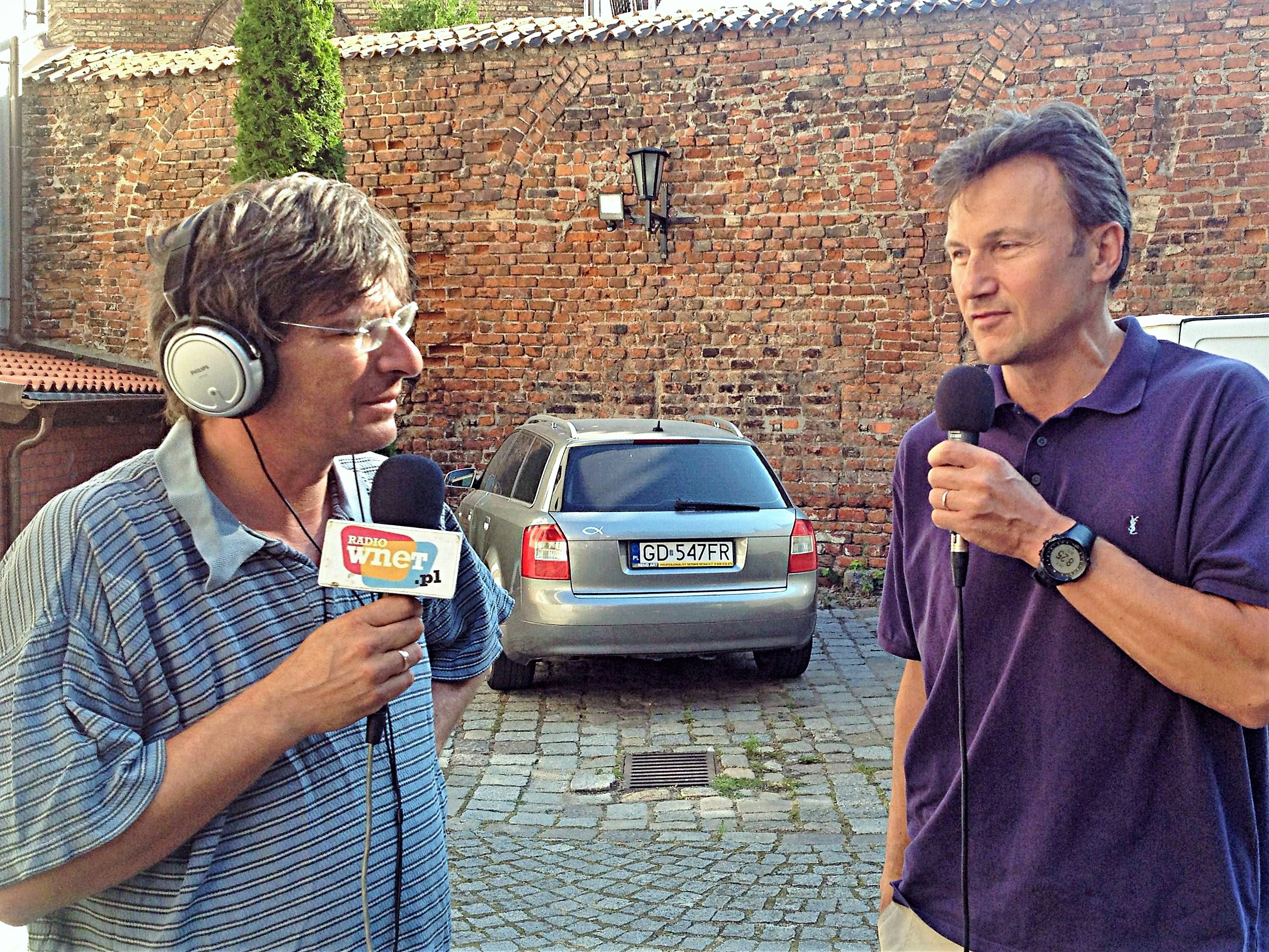
Radio Wnet in Gdańsk.

The author of the name "Radio Wnet" is Grzegorz Wasowski. All the jingles were prepared by Monika and Grzegorz Wasowski. Additional early collaborators of Radio Wnet were Marek Jurek, Janusz Korwin-Mikke, Marek Kamiński, Ludwik Dorn, Ewa Cybulska and Jerzy Kordowicz.

== History ==
- The first broadcast of Radio Wnet was broadcast on May 25, 2009 from Hotel Europejski in Warsaw, where the studio was located until February 15, 2013. The next studio addresses are ul. Koszykowa 8, where Radio Wnet broadcast until September 29, 2014, and then the PAST building at ul. Zielna 39.
- In November 2012, Radio Wnet released the album of rapper Tadek, Inconvenient Truth (Niewygodna prawda)
- In June 2013, Gazeta Wyborcza wrote that the station received PLN 140,000 from Law and Justice. Referring to this situation, Krzysztof Skowroński issued a statement on the website of the Association of Polish Journalists, of which he is the president. He stated that the values of the radio are: "freedom, openness and solidarity", and that the radio can work with those who share these values.
- On September 26, 2018, the Polish Broadcasting Council granted Radio Wnet frequencies to broadcast in Warsaw (87.8 MHz) and Krakow (95.2 MHz). The broadcast began in mid-October.
- On September 13, 2019, the radio was granted a frequency for broadcasting in Wroclaw (96.8 MHz), on October 11, 2019, was granted a frequency of 103.9 MHz for broadcasting in Bialystok, on September 24, 2019 the frequency for broadcasting in Szczecin (98.9 MHz) and on February 4, 2020 the frequency for broadcast in Bydgoszcz (104.4 MHz), Lublin (101.1 MHz) and Lodz (106.1 MHz)
- In connection with the COVID-19 Pandemic in Poland, Radio Wnet on May 3, 2020 inaugurated a special action "Solidarity Radio Action" ("Solidarna Akcja Radiowa) consisting in supporting Polish companies and its entrepreneurs through a social campaign and advertising. The promotional campaign includes broadcasting of advertising spots on FM waves in Warsaw and Krakow and on www.wnet.fm. As part of this special charity action, every entrepreneur can receive a weekly campaign worth PLN 3,000. Currently, Radio WNET accepts applications for advertising campaigns that will be broadcast on June in the air. Two weeks after the start of Solidarity Radio Action received support from LOTOS Group. As part of the Radio Wnet campaign, it provides advertising time to Polish entrepreneurs worth over PLN 250,000. The action is extremely popular, already in the first days more than fifty entities came to it, filling up the May advertising blocks. This fact confirms that the action met with great interest
- Since November 11, 2020, Radio Wnet also includes a Belarusian editorial office which was formed by journalists who were forced to escape the country. The Belarusian edition of "Radio Unet" is a part of Radio Wnet and is broadcast every weekday morning and evening. On 4 July 2023, a Belarusian Court declared the Belarusian edition of Radio Wnet to be ‘extremist organisations’. The status implies that journalists who work for such organisations incur criminal liability and heavy fines or prison terms. The Association of Polish Journalists has denounced the labelling of Radio Unet as an ‘extremist organisation’. On March 14, 2024, Radio Wnet declared that it timely suspends the broadcasting of programs in the Belarusian language.
