= Katarzyna Śliżewska =

- Title: Professor of Agricultural Sciences

Academic background
- Education: PhD: 2002 – Chemical Technology, Łódź University of Technology Habilitation: 2015 – Biotechnology, Łódź University of Technology Professorship: 2022

Academic work
- Discipline: Biotechnology
- Institutions: Łódź University of Technology

Katarzyna Śliżewska – is a Professor and Doctor of Science (habilitation) in engineering, specializing in Food Technology and Nutrition. She is affiliated with the Łódź University of Technology, where she works at the Institute of Fermentation Technology and Microbiology within the Faculty of Biotechnology and Food Sciences. Her scientific activity focuses on probiotics, prebiotics, synbiotics, and food microbiology.

== Education ==
Katarzyna Śliżewska graduated from the Faculty of Food Chemistry and Biotechnology at the Łódź University of Technology (currently the Faculty of Biotechnology and Food Sciences). Following graduation, she joined the Institute of Fermentation and Microbiology in the Department of Technical Microbiology. In 2002, she obtained a PhD degree in Chemical Technology, and in 2015 she earned a habilitation degree in the field of Technical Sciences, discipline: Biotechnology. In 2022, she was awarded the title of Professor of Agricultural Sciences in the discipline of Food Technology and Nutrition.

== Scientific and academic activity ==
Śliżewska's research interests include probiotics of human and animal origin, prebiotics, and synbiotics. She conducts research on the selection of probiotic strains in accordance with FAO/WHO and European Food Safety Authority (EFSA) guidelines, the characterization of prebiotic substances and health-promoting preparations, and the evaluation of their effectiveness in clinical studies involving humans, laboratory animals, and livestock. She also investigates issues related to the detoxification of harmful substances. Her implementation-oriented achievements include the development and commercialization of the probiotic preparations LATOPIC for human use and LAVIPAN for animal nutrition.

Her scientific achievements include 9 monographs, 22 book chapters, more than 120 scientific publications, 26 patents, 220 conference papers and presentations, and participation in 16 research projects. She has also prepared expert opinions, reviews, and assessments for research funding institutions, universities, and industry partners.

She has developed 23 educational curricula, including 10 original academic programmes, and has taught and coordinated courses in 36 subjects. She co-authored a chapter in the academic textbook Technical Microbiology (2007) and authored six teaching manuals. She also supervises doctoral, master's, and engineering theses. Professor Śliżewska has led research projects funded by the State Committee for Scientific Research, the Ministry of Science and Higher Education, and the National Centre for Research and Development. She has undertaken scientific and industrial internships both in Poland and abroad and has actively participated in the organization of national and international scientific conferences. Her research achievements have been recognized with numerous awards, including gold medals at international invention exhibitions in Korea, Belgium, Ukraine, Switzerland, Croatia, and Romania. In 2025, she participated in the Top 1000 Innovators of Poland in Silicon Valley programme, conducted at Stanford University, the University of California, Berkeley, and the Triple Ring Innovation Center in Palo Alto, collaborating on advanced technologies related to microbiome analysis, probiotics, and functional foods. She has received three awards from the Ministry of Science and Higher Education, including the National Education Commission Medal, as well as several distinctions from the Łódź University of Technology, including the “Meritorious for the Łódź University of Technology” badge and the Bronze Medal for Long Service. She is a member of the Federation of European Microbiological Societies (FEMS), the Polish Society of Microbiologists, the Polish Society of Food Technologists, and serves on the editorial boards of the journals Nutrients and International Journal of Agriculture Sciences.

She has also held numerous positions within the collegiate bodies and committees of the Łódź University of Technology. Since 2015, she has been a member of the Faculty Council of Biotechnology and Food Sciences, and since 2019 a member of the Council of the Discipline of Food Technology and Nutrition and several programme councils, including Food and Nutrition Manager, Cosmetic Technology, and Food Technology and Human Nutrition. She has participated in the development and evaluation of academic programmes, diploma examinations, competency assessments, and doctoral education initiatives.
