= Smyczek =

Smyczek (Polish pronunciation: [ˈsmɨ.tʂɛk]) is a Polish surname. Notable people with the surname include:

- Karel Smyczek (born 1950), Czech film director, actor and screenwriter
- Reinhold Smyczek (1918–1994), Polish military officer and emigrant activist
- Tim Smyczek (born 1987), American tennis player
