= Józef Hozer =

Polish economist and professor

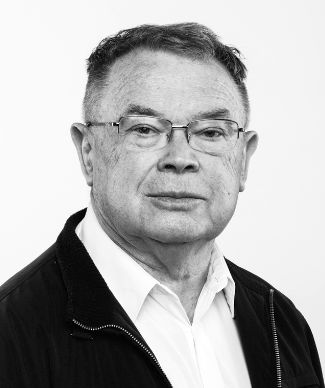
- Born: 19 March 1948; Zielonka
- Died: 18 December 2023 (aged 75); Szczecin
- Education: Szczecin University of Technology
- Known for: Hozer algorithm for mass land valuation
- Awards: Knight's Cross of the Order of Polonia Restituta
- Scientific career
- Fields: econometrics, statistics, real estate appraisal
- Workplaces: University of Szczecin, Szczecin University of Technology

Józef Hozer (19 March 1948 – 18 December 2023) was a Polish professor of economics, specialising in econometrics, statistics, and real estate appraisal. He was an academic teacher and a prominent researcher at the University of Szczecin.

== Biography ==
Józef Hozer graduated from the Faculty of Engineering and Transport Economics at the Szczecin University of Technology (1965–1969), where he subsequently worked as an assistant professor. In 1973, he earned his PhD in economics with a dissertation titled Determining the Optimal Size of a Road Transport Company, which received an award from the Minister of Science and Higher Education. In 1981, he obtained his habilitation and was appointed associate professor at the Szczecin University of Technology. In 1987, the State Council of Poland granted him the title of professor. From 1991, he served as a full professor at the University of Szczecin. Hozer undertook numerous research internships, including at the Institute of Econometrics in Katowice under Prof. Zbigniew Pawłowski (1974), Sorbonne Nouvelle University in Paris (1975), Loyola University Chicago (1988), the University of Pennsylvania under Prof. Lawrence Klein (1990), Lumière University Lyon 2 (1990), and University of Manchester (1998).

He was married to Ewa (PhD in economics) and had two daughters: Marta (PhD in economics) and Hanna (graduate of the Academy of Music in opera singing).

Józef Hozer was buried at the Central Cemetery in Szczecin, plot 20C-6-2.

== Academic career ==
Professor Hozer's broad research interests led him to lead and participate in numerous research grants, including those funded by the State Committee for Scientific Research and central research projects. Notable projects included: Econometric Modelling of Enterprises and Their Environment (1988–1990), Econometric Algorithm for Mass Land Valuation (1998–1999), Analysis of Capital and Real Estate Markets as Competitive Investment Areas (1998–2000), Impact of Information Asymmetry on the Risk of Polish Insurance Institutions (1999–2000), Analysis of Disabled Persons' Participation in the Labour Market in Western Pomerania (2000–2001), Econometric Analysis of Micro- and Macro-Structural Proportions in the Polish Economy (1997–1998), and Use of Event History Analysis and Firm Demography to Study Firm Longevity (2006–2009). A key contribution was his observation of a "mysterious" relationship between the number of households and firms, expressed as a ratio of 5 (Quantum satis). Another significant achievement was the development of a computer algorithm for mass land valuation (cadastral and market value), known as the Hozer algorithm, which was applied multiple times in practice.

Hozer participated in over 30 international conferences and was a beneficiary of an Individual Mobility Grant (Tempus, Brussels). From 1983, under the auspices of the Polish Academy of Sciences, he organised the National Conference on Microeconometrics in Theory and Practice. The 14th edition of this conference, held in September 2009 on the ferry Pomerania during a voyage from Świnoujście to Copenhagen, attracted over 100 researchers from major Polish academic centres.

In 1994, he was appointed to the Editorial Board of the Polish Academy of Sciences' Przegląd Statystyczny. He was also a member of the Committee of Statistics and Econometrics of the Polish Academy of Sciences and the World Econometric Society.

== Selected publications ==
=== Journal articles ===
- "Analiza kształtowania się współczynnika wykorzystania taboru w przedsiębiorstwie transportu samochodowego" [Analysis of the Utilisation Rate of Vehicle Fleets in Road Transport Companies]. Przegląd Komunikacyjny (in Polish). 10. 1972.
- "Ekonometryczna analiza kosztów w przedsiębiorstwie transportu samochodowego" [Econometric Analysis of Costs in a Road Transport Enterprise]. Zesz. Nauk. Polit. Szczec. (in Polish). 137. 1972.
- "Wykorzystanie pojęcia środka ciężkości przy agregacji w zagadnieniu transportowym" [Use of the Centre of Gravity Concept in Aggregation for Transport Problems]. Przegląd Statystyczny (in Polish). 3. 1972.
- "Uwagi o wykorzystaniu statystyki φ2 oraz F w modelowaniu zmiennych dla danych sezonowych" [Notes on the Use of φ² and F Statistics in Modelling Seasonal Data Variables]. Przegląd Statystyczny (in Polish). 2. 1977.
- "Na marginesie badania regresji i korelacji między zmiennymi ekonomicznymi dla danych w postaci szeregów czasowych" [On the Study of Regression and Correlation Between Economic Variables in Time Series Data]. Wiadomości Statystyczne (in Polish). 10. 1983.
- "Application des méthodes économétriques dans le domain des transports" [Application of Econometric Methods in the Field of Transport]. Université des Sciences Sociales de Toulouse (in French). 158. 1984.
- "Zastosowanie taksonomii wrocławskiej w badaniu gospodarności przedsiębiorstwa" [Application of Wrocław Taxonomy in Studying Enterprise Efficiency]. Prace Naukowe Akademii Ekonomicznej (in Polish). 262. 1984.
- "Struktura podmiotowa i rzeczowa a dynamika systemów gospodarczych" [Subjective and Material Structure vs. the Dynamics of Economic Systems]. Wiadomości Statystyczne (in Polish). 2. 1987.
- "Równanie końcowe modelu ekonometrycznego w świetle wniosków płynących z twierdzenia Frischa-Waugha-Stone'a" [Final Equation of an Econometric Model in Light of the Frisch-Waugh-Stone Theorem]. Przegląd Statystyczny (in Polish). 3–4. 1989.
- "O współczynniku łącznego dyskonta, czyli o współczynniku wartości zaktualizowanej renty rocznej (annuity)" [On the Total Discount Factor, or the Coefficient of the Present Value of an Annual Annuity]. Giełda Nieruchomości (in Polish). 11. 1993.
- "Zastosowanie równania logistycznego w modelu ekonometrycznym" [Application of the Logistic Equation in an Econometric Model]. Przegląd Statystyczny (in Polish). 3. 1998.
- "Regresja wieloraka a wycena nieruchomości" [Multiple Regression and Real Estate Valuation]. Rzeczoznawca Majątkowy (in Polish). 2001.
- "Ekonometryczna interpretacja skłonności w ekonomii" [Econometric Interpretation of Propensities in Economics]. Przegląd Statystyczny (in Polish). 3. 2002.
- "Quantum satis dla ilości firm i gospodarstw domowych w województwie zachodniopomorskim" [Quantum satis for the Number of Firms and Households in Western Pomerania]. Przegląd Statystyczny Województwa Zachodniopomorskiego (in Polish). 2. 2002.
- "W sprawie zasadniczej proporcji gospodarczej" [On the Fundamental Economic Proportion]. Metody Ilościowe w Badaniach Ekonomicznych (in Polish). 13 (1): 127–130. 2012.

=== Book monographs ===
- Ekonometryczna analiza kosztów w przedsiębiorstwie transportu samochodowego jako element usprawnienia zarządzania [Econometric Analysis of Costs in Road Transport Companies as a Tool for Improving Management] (in Polish). Szczecin: Wyd. Uczelniane Polit. Szczec. 1972.
- Ekonometria stosowana [Applied Econometrics] (in Polish). Szczecin: Wyd. Nauk. Uniw. Szczec. 1985.
- Zastosowanie ekonometrii w transporcie [Applications of Econometrics in Transport] (in Polish). Warsaw: WKiŁ. 1986.
- Sfery zastosowań ekonometrii w przedsiębiorstwie handlowym [Applications of Econometrics in Commercial Enterprises] (in Polish). Szczecin: Wyd. Nauk. Uniw. Szczec. 1992.
- Zmienna czasowa i jej rola w badaniach ekonometrycznych [The Time Variable and Its Role in Econometric Research] (in Polish). Warsaw: PWN. 1999. ISBN 83-01-09405-2.
- Mikroekonometria – analizy, diagnozy, prognozy [Microeconometrics – Analyses, Diagnoses, Forecasts] (in Polish). Warsaw: PWE. 1993. ISBN 83-208-0911-8.
- Ekonometria skłonności [Econometrics of Propensities] (in Polish). Warsaw: PWE. 2004. ISBN 83-208-1522-3.
- Matematyczno-ekonomiczne modele funkcjonowania gospodarki [Mathematical-Economic Models of Economic Functioning] (in Polish). Szczecin: Wyd. Nauk. Uniw. Szczec. 2004. ISBN 83-7241-420-3.
- Metody ilościowe na rynku nieruchomości i rynku pracy [Quantitative Methods in Real Estate and Labour Markets] (in Polish). Szczecin: Wyd. Nauk. Uniw. Szczec. 2012. ISBN 97-883-7241-891-3.
- Wiedza ekspercka a ekonometryczne modelowanie cen gruntów w aglomeracji szczecińskiej [Expert Knowledge and Econometric Modelling of Land Prices in the Szczecin Agglomeration] (in Polish). Szczecin: Wyd. Nauk. Uniw. Szczec. 2023. ISBN 97-883-7972-574-8.

== Awards and honours ==
- Knight's Cross of the Order of Polonia Restituta (1995).
- General Józef Haller Medal (2009).
- Five awards from the Minister of Science and Higher Education.
- Multiple awards from the Rector of the University of Szczecin.
