= Czesław Strumiłło =

Chemical Engineer

Czeslaw Strumillo
- Czesław Strumiłło
- Born: 17 February 1930; Vilnius, Lithuania
- Died: 30 September 2018 (aged 88)
- Education: Lodz University of Technology
- Known for: Heat and mass transfer processes
- Awards: Order of Polonia Restituta: Knight's Cross(1969)
- Scientific career
- Fields: Chemistry
- Workplaces: Lodz University of Technology

Czesław Strumiłło (17 February 1930 – 30 September 2018) was a Polish chemical engineer, a founder of a scientific theory in the field of drying processes and a former rector of the Lodz University of Technology.

In 1952 he graduated from the Faculty of Chemistry, Lodz University of Technology. In 1960 he obtained the Doctor of Science degree, in 1966 his postdoctoral scientific qualifications and associate professor and professor degrees in 1974, and 1981, respectively.

He is an honoris causa doctor of the Strathclyde University in Great Britain, Lodz University of Technology and University of West Hungary. He is an ordinary member of the Polish Academy of Sciences. He was twice selected a member of the State Committee for Scientific Research, in 1993–96 he was the Vice Chairperson of this Committee. He is the Vice President of the Lodz Institute of the Polish Academy of Sciences, a vice chairperson of the Committee on Chemical and Process Engineering of the Polish Academy of Sciences, a Polish representative in Drying Working Party and Science Advisory Committee European Federation of Chemical Engineering. In 1995 he received the title of the Honorary Professor of the Tianjin University in China. From 1984 to 1987 he was a Vice Rector, and from 1987 to 1990 the Rector of the Lodz University of Technology. From 1993 to 1999 he was the Dean of the Faculty of Process and Environmental Engineering.

== Scientific activity ==
His scientific activity is connected with heat and mass transfer in the processes of distillation, evaporation, drying and fluidization. He is an author of the first Polish monograph in the field of drying. His scientific achievements include 250 publications, 7 handbooks and monographs related to chemical engineering and process engineering. He has promoted 15 doctors of science.
