= Anna Sitarska =

Polish librarian and university teacher(1937–2023)

- Born: June 29, 1938; Baranowo, Poland
- Died: April 21, 2023; Warsaw
- Occupation(s): Library and information science
- Awards: Order of Polonia Restituto

Anna Sitarska (June 29, 1938 in Baranowo – April 21, 2023) was a Polish librarian and university teacher with a PhD in humanities. In 2013, she was awarded the Commander's Cross of the Order of Polonia Restituta by President Bronisław Komorowski for her outstanding contribution to scientific and research work in the field of library and information sciences for the protection of national heritage.

== Life ==
She studied librarianship at the University of Warsaw in 1961, where she defended her master's thesis. In 1961–1963, she was employed as an assistant in the library science department of the University of Warsaw, in 1969-63 as a senior assistant, in 1969-1970 as an assistant professor, and in 1970.

Sitarska defended her doctorate at the University of Warsaw in 1969 based on a thesis on organizational and methodological issues of bibliographic automation written under the supervision of Krystyna Rimerova. In her scientific work, she specialized in librarianship and scientific and technical information.

She was the secretary of the library science education team of the Ministry of Science, Higher Education and Technology in 1972–1975.
