= Maria Dobrowolska =

Polish geographer (1895-1984)

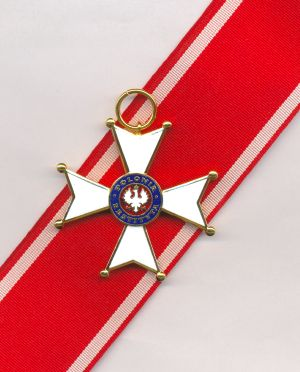
- Commander's Cross
- Born: Maria Mrazkówna; 26 May 1895; Ropice
- Died: 22 October 1984 (aged 89); Kraków, Poland
- Burial place: Salwatorski Cemetery
- Education: Jagiellonian University
- Occupations: Geographer, professor
- Spouse: Kazimierz Dobrowolski

Maria Dobrowolska née Mrazkówna (born 26 May 1895 in Ropice, died 22 October 1984 in Kraków) was a Polish geographer and professor who set up and taught at a secret school in her home during World War II during the German occupation of Poland.

== Biography ==
She was born Maria Mrazkówna in 1895 in Ropice and attended high school in Kraków. In the years 1915–1919 she studied geography at the Jagiellonian University in Kraków. During World War I, she was an activist of the Women's League of Galicia and Silesia. In 1921, she defended her doctoral thesis, supervised by Ludomir Sawicki. A long-time teacher in Krakow secondary schools. During German occupation of Poland during World War II, she participated in secret teaching, managing teaching center No. 6 in Kraków-Dębniki, with a school located in the apartment she shared with her husband Kazimierz Dobrowolski, a cultural historian and sociologist, who was one of 183 Krakow scientists arrested on 6 November 1939. He was held in Germany for several months at the Sachsenhausen concentration camp.

With the end of the War, Maria helped Rodion Mochnacki and Jan Flis organize a master's studies program in geography. From 1949 on, she worked at the Higher Pedagogical School (now the Pedagogical University) in Krakow. She was the first head of the Department of Geography at the Academy of Fine Arts, and from 1951, was head of the Department of Social and Economic Geography. Their work which formed the basis for geography-related departments established in 1952, and became the foundation of the Institute of Geography of the Pedagogical University of Krakow, established in 1971.

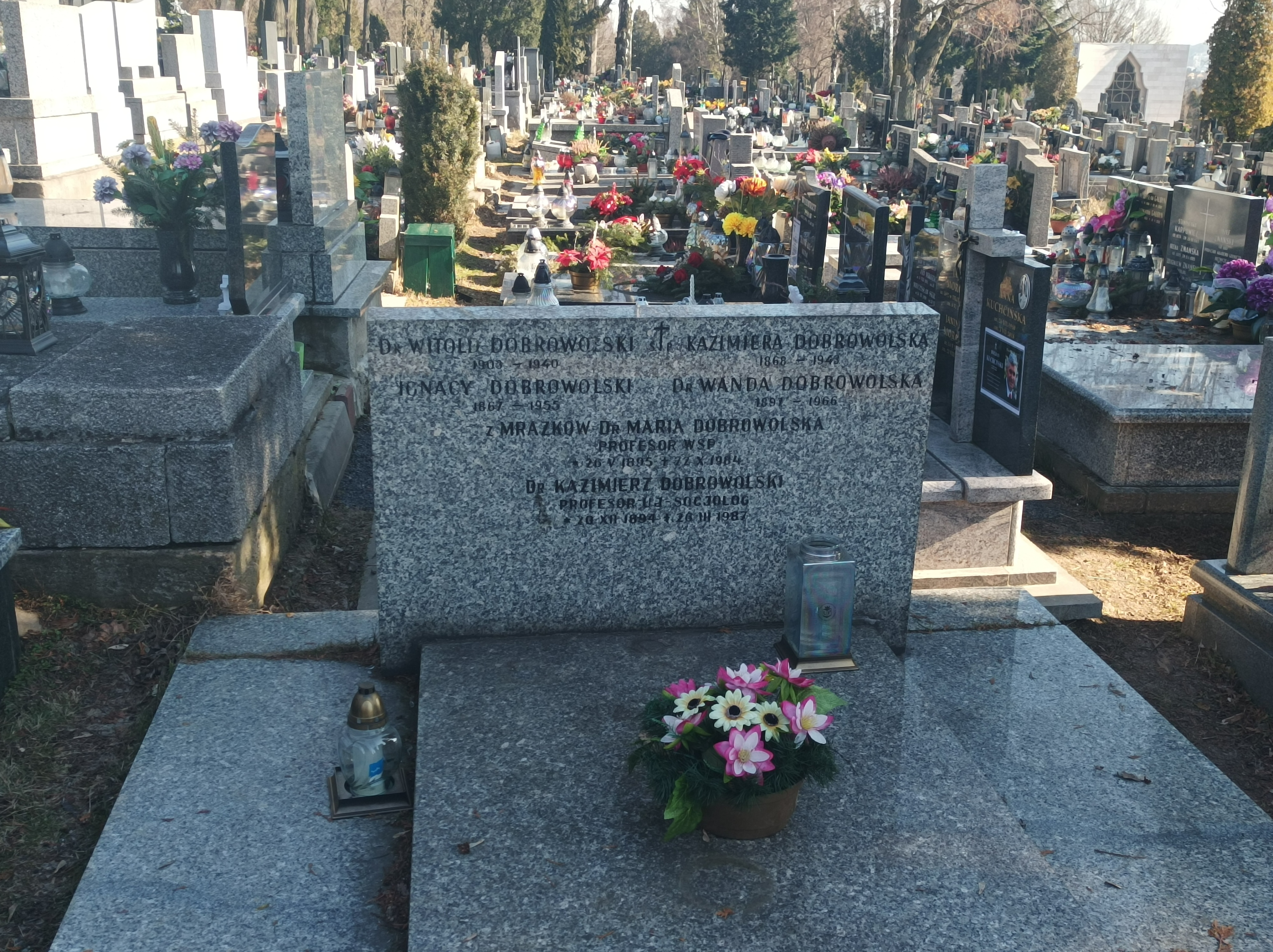
Gravesite of Maria Dobrowolska and husband Kazimierz Dobrowolski in Salwatorski cemetery.

Dobrowolska wrote works on settlement geography, regionalization and methodology and authored the work: Dynamics of the cultural landscape. In 1967 she retired.

She died in 1984 was buried beside her husband at the Salwatorski Cemetery (sector SC 12, row C, grave 6).

== Selected honors ==
For her work, she was awarded the Commander's Cross of the Order of Polonia Restituta, the Medal of the National Education Commission and the title of "Distinguished Teacher of the Polish People's Republic".
