= Jan Wróblewski =

Jan Wróblewski may refer to:

- Jan Ptaszyn Wróblewski (born 1936), Polish jazz musician, composer and arranger
- Jan Wróblewski (glider pilot) (born 1940)
