= Lucjan Kydryński =

Polish journalist (1929–2006)

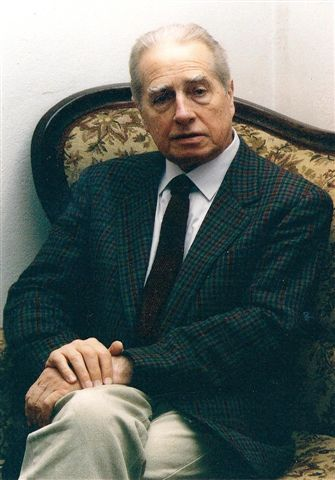
Lucjan Kydryński

Lucjan Kydryński (6 January 1929 in Grudziądz – 9 September 2006 in Warsaw) was a Polish journalist and writer, radio and TV program host.

His activities include writing satire for Przekrój, being the host of the National Festival of Polish Song in Opole and Sopot Festival.

On 14 September 2006, Polish President Lech Kaczyński posthumously awarded Lucjan Kydryński with the Officer's Cross of the Order of Polonia Restituta for his contributions to Polish culture.

== Family ==
Wife: Halina Kunicka, singer, son: Marcin Kydryński, music journalist, producer, composer, songwriter, Anna Maria Jopek, musician and singer, wife of Marcin Kydryński.

== Bibliography ==
- Przejazdem przez życie...: kroniki rodzinne, Kraków, 2005, Wydawnictwo Literackie, ISBN 8308037801
- Przewodnik operetkowy: wodewil, operetka, musical
- Marek i Wacek – historia prawdziwa, 1990, ISBN 83-7003-635-X
- Przewodnik po filmach muzycznych, 2000, Polskie Wydawnictwo Muzyczne,ISBN 83-224-0514-6
- Gershwin, 1998, Polskie Wydawnictwo Muzyczne, ISBN 83-224-0510-3
- Jan Strauss, Polskie Wydawnictwa Muzyczne, 1979
- Opera na cały rok, Kraków, 1989
