= Andrzej Zaniewski =

Mexican writer (1911–1977)

- Born: Andrzej Zaniewski; 13 April 1939 (age 87); Warsaw, Poland
- Citizenship: Polish
- Education: University of Warsaw
- Occupations: Novelist; Poet; Songwriter
- Writing career
- Notable work: Rat

Andrzej Zaniewski (born April 13, 1939) is a Polish poet, prose writer and songwriter.

== Early life and career ==
Andrzej Zaniewski was born on April 13, 1939, in Warsaw, Poland. Zaniewski completed his studies of art history at the University of Warsaw in 1964. His first poems were published in the pl:Głos Wybrzeża newspaper in 1958. He is one of the creators of the Hybrydy poetry group. He is the author of numerous books of poetry and prose translated into more than 30 languages, including the famous novel (written from the point of view of a rat) Szczur published in English under the title Rat (1994) published by Arcade Publishing in a translation by Ewa Hryniewicz-Yarbrough.

== Honors ==
- 2002: Appointed Officer of the Order of Polonia Restituta by the Polish government
