= Ludwika Wawrzyńska =

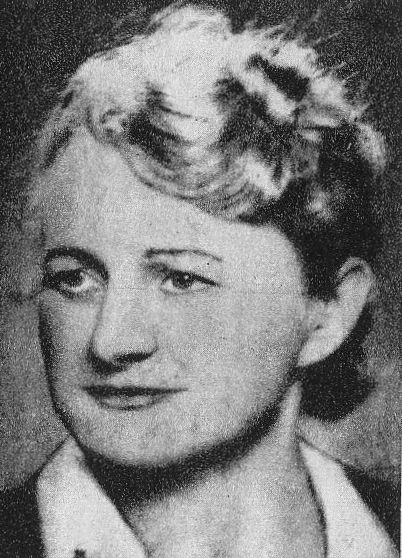
Ludwika Wawrzyńska

Ludwika Wawrzyńska (Polish pronunciation: [luˈdvika vaˈvʐɨj̃ska]; 1908–1955) was a Polish teacher who worked at an elementary school in Warsaw. On February 8, 1955 she rescued four children from a burning house where they had been locked by their parents as they were leaving for work. She died ten days later, on February 18, from severe burns.

Wawrzyńska acquired a hero status in Poland and became a symbol of selfless sacrifice. She was awarded the Commander's Cross of the Order of Polonia Restituta. Wisława Szymborska and Leopold Staff wrote poems in her praise. Several schools in Poland are named after her.
