= Leon Starkiewicz =

Polish teacher

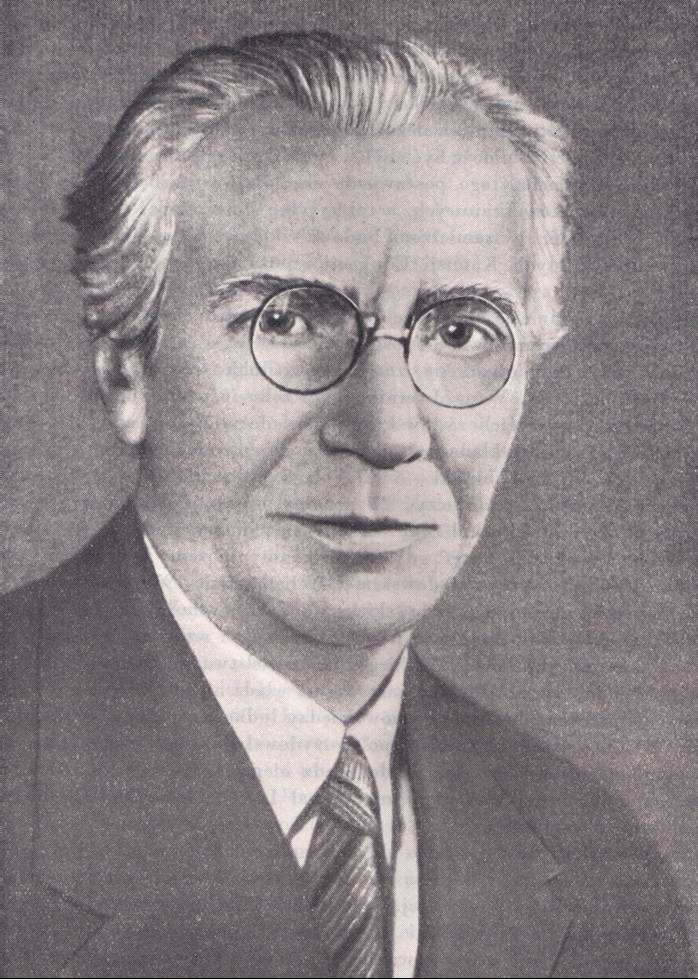
- Born: 1878 or May 24, 1881; Będzin
- Died: September 16, 1953 (aged 72); Busko-Zdrój
- Burial place: parish cemetery in Busko-Zdrój
- Education: University of Warsaw
- Occupations: principal, teacher of natural sciences
- Employer: Municipal Gymnasium in Łódź
- Parent(s): Antoni Starkiewicz, Leonia Jundziłło
- Honours: Order of Polonia Restituta

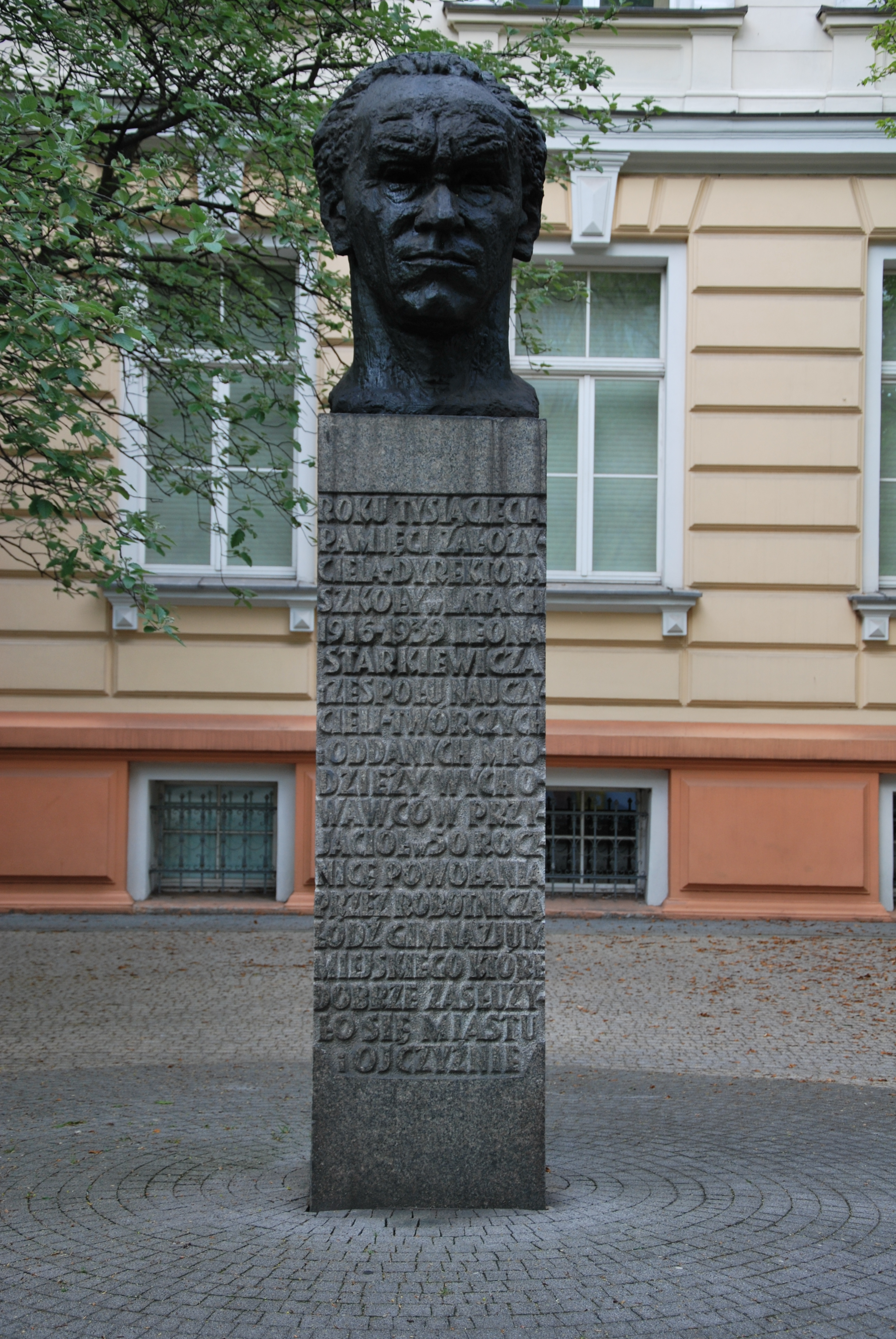
Bust of Leon Starkiewicz in front of the building of the Third High School in Łódź

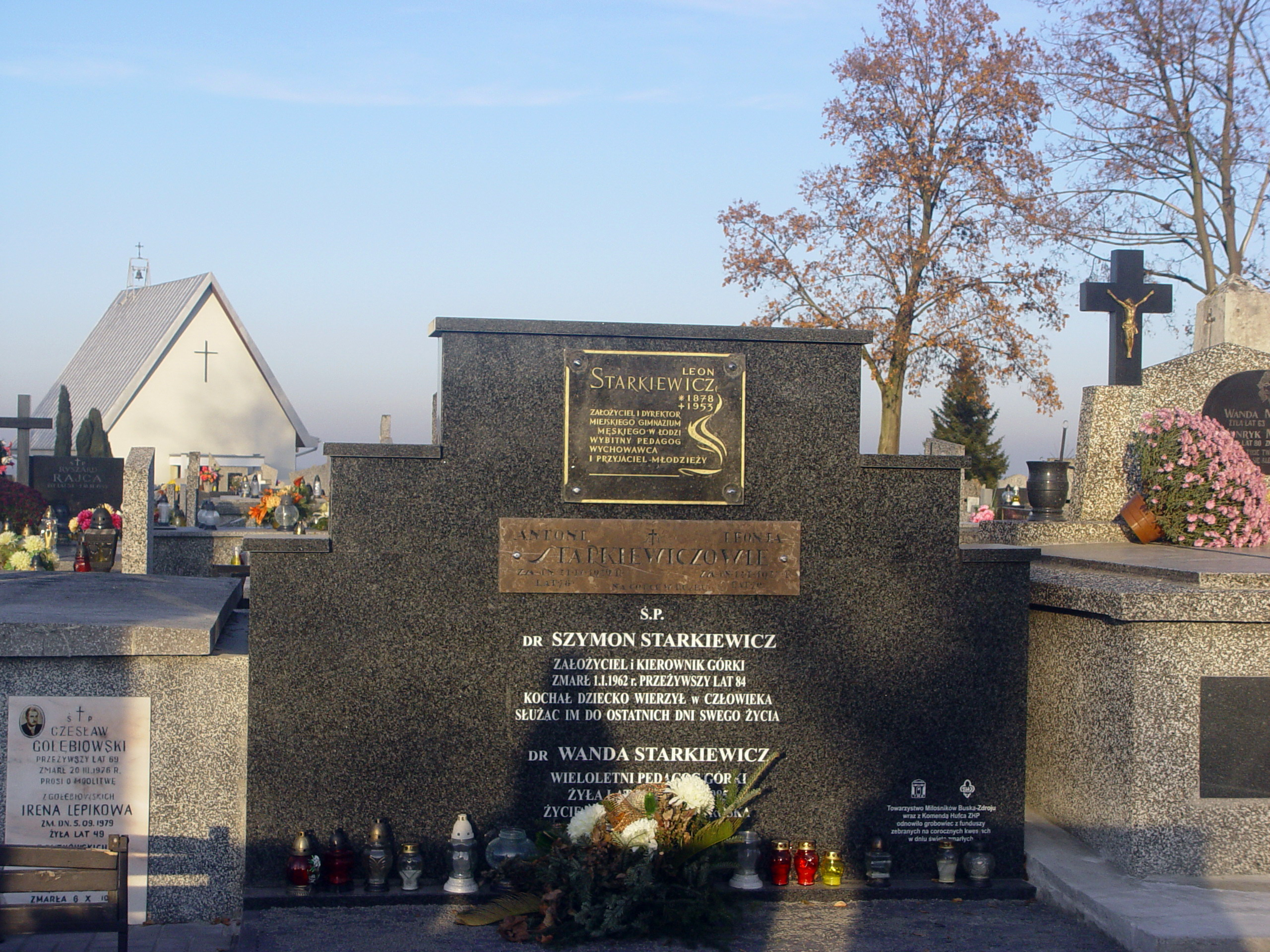
Starkiewicz family tomb in Busko-Zdrój with the inscription: "Leon Starkiewicz – founder and director of the Municipal Gymnasium in Łódź, an outstanding educator, mentor, and friend of youth"

Leon Starkiewicz (born in 1878 or on 24 May 1881 in Będzin, died on 16 September 1953 in Busko-Zdrój) was a Polish teacher, founder, and long-time principal of the Municipal Gymnasium in Łódź. (Note: At the same time, another Leon Starkiewicz (died in 1941 in Lviv) lived – a nobleman, son of a Greek Catholic priest, landowner in places such as Trostianets, Litiatyn, and Łuka, educated as a farmer, a longtime collaborator of the magazine Łowca Polski and author of numerous articles on fishing and hunting, father-in-law of the painter Kazimierz Sichulski.)

He came from a family of teachers. Starkiewicz began his natural science studies at the University of Warsaw, but after being expelled in 1905 for participating in a school strike, he continued his education independently. After passing his diploma exam, he became a teacher of natural sciences. From 1910 to 1916, he taught at the Polish Gymnasium. He was ideologically connected to the Warsaw Organization of Independence Teachers, organizing activities aimed at removing the Russian language from schools and commemorating the January Uprising anniversary in schools.

From 1916 to 1939, he worked as a teacher and director at a new school he established for boys from less affluent families. During World War II, he stayed in Busko-Zdrój and its surroundings, where he participated in clandestine teaching. After the war, he did not return to Łódź. His legacy was carried on by his successors, including his former students, who managed the Tadeusz Kościuszko Third General High School in post-war Poland.

== Biography ==
=== Childhood and youth ===
He was the son of Antoni Starkiewicz and Leonia Jundziłło. His father was Lithuanian, and the family communicated in Lithuanian at his grandparents' house, using the language for their correspondence as well. His mother was from Kresy and was a Uniate. Both parents were teachers in the primary schools of Congress Poland (Piotrków Voivodeship). The birth of their first son, Szymon, was kept hidden for over a year to avoid the compulsory Orthodox faith, which Russian law required for children of mixed marriages (this would have led to the child being recognized as Russian). To be certain, the family moved to Będzin, where the child was registered in the civil records. Leon was one of three younger brothers of Szymon. The brothers attended the primary school in Będzin, run by their father.

In later years, their paths diverged: Szymon became a pediatrician and founder of the Górka Sanatorium in Busko-Zdrój, another brother became a mining engineer and director of a mine in Dąbrowa Górnicza, and Leon, continuing the family tradition, became a teacher.

He studied natural sciences at the University of Warsaw. During his studies, he actively participated in the student organization Spójnia. After being expelled from the university for participating in the school strike of 1905, he continued his education independently while working as a teacher in Olkusz and Piotrków Trybunalski. In 1908, he was granted permission to continue his studies externally and passed an exam before the state commission in Odesa, earning the title of candidate of natural sciences.

=== Teaching career in Łódź ===
Leon Starkiewicz was a teacher, principal, and education organizer in Łódź during the struggle for independence and the interwar period.

From 1910 to 1916, he taught natural sciences at the 8-grade Boys' Polish Gymnasium, where Jan Czeraszkiewicz served as principal starting in 1911. During World War I, he and a group of progressive educators campaigned to remove the Russian language from schools. On 15 March 1915, they co-organized a rally where a resolution was passed: "We demand Polish as the language of instruction for all subjects, the introduction of Polish history and geography into schools, and the conduct of all administrative activities in Polish".

Permission to introduce Polish as the language of instruction was granted. In August that same year, Starkiewicz and other educators actively opposed the subordination of Łódź schools to German police. Meetings with the chief of police and written protests resulted in the schools retaining considerable autonomy.

In early 1916, a major conflict arose between a group of teachers and the principal over how to commemorate the 53rd anniversary of the January Uprising. Teachers Julian Brona, Stanisław Garlicki, Leon Starkiewicz, Konstanty Wysznacki, and Wacław Zawadzki – aligned ideologically with the Warsaw Organization of Independence Teachers – proposed holding a patriotic demonstration on school grounds during a day off. The proposal was categorically rejected by the principal. In protest, the proponents deliberately did not report to work on the anniversary. Shortly after, they were dismissed.

Starkiewicz then became involved in establishing a new boys' school for children from underprivileged families, the traditions of which are continued today by the Tadeusz Kościuszko General High School in Łódź. He also contributed to the newly formed Łódź School District Board, collaborating with figures like Tadeusz Łopuszański and Jan Jarosz. He served as the principal of the new school from 2 October 1916 to December 1939.

As a teacher, Starkiewicz taught geology, biology, mineralogy, and petrography. As a principal, he sought to provide students with diverse areas of activity, from technical projects to philosophy and cooperative ventures to preparing a horse skeleton for study. He also vigorously campaigned for funds to support disadvantaged students, enabling them to pursue higher education.

He maintained close ties with the Piotrków branch of the Polish Sightseeing Society, co-organizing a museum section with Michał Rawita-Witanowski, Józef Karczewski, and others. Onufry Krajewski became the first curator of the museum collections. Starkiewicz also served as a school inspector for the Łódź School District Board and worked with the Department of Culture and Education in the Łódź City Council.

=== World War II period ===
During the German occupation, the school building in Łódź housed a German girls' school. Many members of the teaching staff, Leon Starkiewicz's closest colleagues and friends, did not survive the war. Among them were Zygmunt Hajkowski, a Polish language teacher, who died in Auschwitz concentration camp, and historian Zygmunt Lorentz, who was tortured to death by the Gestapo at Sterling Street (then Robert-Koch-Straße) in Łódź in 1943.

Leon Starkiewicz was expelled from Łódź and, with the help of former students, particularly Mieczysław Stawski, relocated to Busko-Zdrój, where his brother Szymon resided. Initially, he worked in the office of a brickyard owned by the Górka Sanatorium. Later, he moved to the small village of Tuczępy, where he taught at an agricultural school until August 1944 and conducted secret teaching sessions in a rural hut. Tuczępy was part of a clandestine education network, with its hub at the Gymnasium and High School in Busko-Zdrój.

When the Busko area became part of the frontline, Starkiewicz was evacuated by Soviet forces to Sandomierz. His health deteriorated, and he declined an invitation to Lublin to work in the newly established education department of the Polish Committee of National Liberation. He instead contributed in Rytwiany as a Russian language translator, supporting the creation of the new Polish administration. After the 1945 Soviet offensive, he returned to Górka in Busko-Zdrój.

=== Post-war period ===
After the war, Leon Starkiewicz decided not to return to Łódź. He resumed administrative duties at the Górka Sanatorium in Busko-Zdrój. Upon retiring, he remained in Busko, dedicating his time to fishing, one of his passions, and translating books on fishing techniques.

He died in 1953 and was buried in the family tomb at the parish cemetery in Busko-Zdrój, located on Langiewicz Street. The tomb also holds the remains of his parents.

== Orders and decorations ==
- Knight's Cross of the Order of Polonia Restituta (9 November 1932)

== Commemoration ==
On 20 November 1966, during the school's 50th anniversary celebrations, a monument to Principal Leon Starkiewicz was unveiled in front of the school's façade. The monument was created by Marian Wnuk, with architectural design by Marian Spychalski, Marshal of Poland and a former student of the school. (Note: In the 1966 commemorative book of the school's anniversary reunion, the following was written: "On the morning of 20 November 1966, a monument to Principal Leon Starkiewicz was unveiled in front of the school building. The initiative for the monument's construction came from the Alumni Association, and it was realized thanks to the efforts and financial support of the Łódź National Council. The unveiling ceremony was the central event of the Teacher's Day celebrations in Łódź. The ceremony was attended by Marshal Marian Spychalski, representatives of municipal authorities, President of the Main Board of the Polish Teachers' Union M. Walczak, Curator M. Woźniakowski, the school's Pedagogical Council, a large gathering of Łódź teachers, members of the Alumni Association, and students. After the reading of the monument's erection act by the Chairman of the Alumni Association, the monument was unveiled by the First Secretary of the Łódź Provincial Committee of the Polish United Workers' Party, Józef Spychalski". The anniversary reunion and the unveiling ceremony were attended by the director's daughter, Eugenia Starkiewicz-Chłapowska, who was living in Warsaw at the time.)

== Opinions and memories ==
Witold Dembowski, author of the biographical sketch in Dzieje szkoły. 50-lecie Gimnazjum Miejskiego w Łodzi (1968), wrote in his conclusion:

During his twenty years at the head of the Gymnasium, Principal Leon Starkiewicz proved not only to be an outstanding educator, but also made great contributions as a social and educational activist. He created a school that, through its practical achievements, paved the way for new forms of social education.

Mieczysław Woźniakowski, the first post-war principal of the gymnasium and one of Starkiewicz's alumni, reflected on the respect Starkiewicz earned from his students in his 1982 book Było i tak i siak. Woźniakowski believed that Starkiewicz's deep inner culture, tact (he never used harsh words against either teachers or students), extensive knowledge in his fields of expertise (geology, mineralogy, petrology), broad general knowledge, scientific interests, respect for individuality, liberal worldview, and tolerance were the main reasons for his profound respect among students. He also noted Starkiewicz's unyielding opposition to all forms of obscurantism, nationalism, anti-Semitism, and reactionism. The image of the pre-war school Starkiewicz built became an obsession for Woźniakowski. He also mentioned that a portrait of Starkiewicz, painted by one of his students, Feliks Paszkowski, was displayed in the school's auditorium. Other alumni, members of the Alumni Association, have expressed similar opinions.
