= Andrzej Chmielewski =

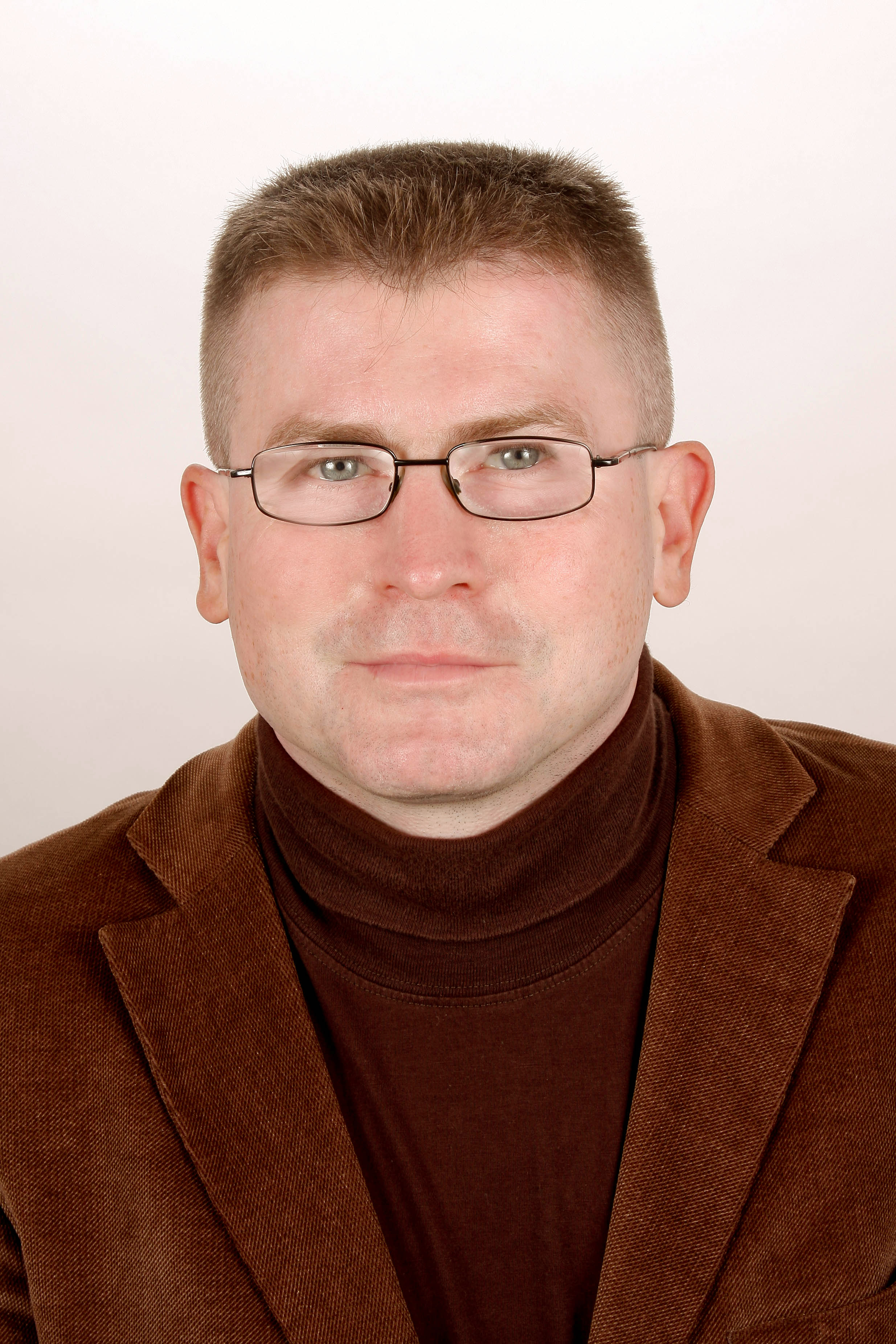
Andrzej Chmielewski

Andrzej Chmielewski (born in 1971 in Międzyrzecz) – Polish regionalist and local government official, author of books and publications on the Międzyrzecz land and the Lubuskie region.

Andrzej Chmielewski specializes in collecting memories of witnesses of the Second World War and pioneers of the Western Territories. Since 2007, he is the owner of the Literat Publishing House, he writes and publishes books on regional topics (also in German and English). Since 2014, he has been a councilor of the City Council in Międzyrzecz (7th and 8th terms of office), and since 2018, the vice-president of the Council. He was the originator of the erection of the Monument to the Pioneers of the Międzyrzecz Land, the estab-lishment of the Pioneer Day and the foundation of the Międzyrzecz Senior Card and the Veteran Card.

He is also a member of the Eagle Protection Committee, the Lubuski Natural-ists' Club (Klub Przyrodników) in Świebodzin and the Historical Society of the Międzyrzecz Land. He was a long-time member of the editorial staff of the magazine Kurier Międzyrzecki, currently he collaborates with the editorial of-fice of the Powiatowa monthly magazine and with the association of former German residents of Międzyrzecz Heimatkreis Meseritz e.V. and the Italian newspaper Report Difesa.

He has published, amongst many others, in the magazines Gazeta Lubuska, Głos Międzyrzecza i Skwierzyny, in the regional fishing magazine - Na Ryby, in magazines Praca i Nauka za Granicą, II Swiatowa, Revue Wojna. His articles have also appeared in the Bulletin of the Lubuskie Naturalists Club as well as in the following books as Küstrin-Kostrzyn in the past (2008), Ziemia Międzyrzecka w Przeszłości (since 2009), Forty - Jeńcy - Monety Pasjonaci o Twierdzy Kostrzyn (2011), Miasto i Twierdza Kostrzyn nad Odrą, wykopaliska, cmentarze, świątynie (2012), Międzyrzecki Rejon Umocniony 80 lat zabytku architektury obronnej (2013), annual Ziemia Lubuska (2015), Militarne Dziedzictwo Świebodzina i okolic (2016), Militarne Dziedzictwo Świebodzina i okolic. Ochrona i Badania (2018), ADHIBENDA Rocznik Archiwum Diecezjalnego w Zielonej Górze (2021). Nowa Marchia - prowincja zapomniana - wspólne korzenie (2022).

== Awards ==
- In 2018, the Award Nagroda Starosty Międzyrzeckiego for promoting the Międzyrzecki District,
- Personality of the Year Osobowosc Roku 2019 of the Międzyrzecz poviat of Gazeta Lubuska in the category: politics, local government and local community,
- Personality of the Year Osobowosc Roku 2019 of the Lubuskie Voivodeship (second place in the category: politics, local government and local communi-ty),
- Złoty Dukat Lubuski 2020 za wspieranie i promowanie życia kulturalnego regionu.

== Publications ==
=== Books ===
- Przyroda Gminy Międzyrzecz (2006), UMiG Międzyrzecz sin ISBN
- Zespół Przyrodniczo-Krajobrazowy Uroczyska MRU i Rezerwat Nietoperek MRU (2007), publishing house Wydawnictwo Klub Przewodników Świebodzin, ISBN 978-83-878469-23
- Na ryby w okolice Międzyrzecza (2007), publishing house Wydawnictwo Lite-rat Andrzej Chmielewski Międzyrzecz, ISBN 978-83-925864-0-1
- Rowerem wokół Międzyrzecza (2008), publishing house Wydawnictwo Literat Andrzej Chmielewski Międzyrzecz, ISBN 978-83-925864-2-5
- Przyroda Gminy Trzciel (2009), publishing house Wydawnictwo Literat An-drzej Chmielewski Międzyrzecz, ISBN 978-83-925864-3-2
- Oni odbudowali tu Polskę. Wspomnienia Pionierów Ziemi Międzyrzeckiej (2010), publishing house Wydawnictwo Literat Andrzej Chmielewski Między-rzecz, ISBN 978-83-925864-4-9
- Widziałem Gomorę w Rokitnie – wkroczenie Armii Czerwonej do Rokitna, seria Germania, część 1 (2012), publishing house Wydawnictwo Literat Andrzej Chmielewski Międzyrzecz, ISBN 978-83-925864-8-7
- 1945 Policko – krwawa pułapka, seria Germania, część 2 (2013), publishing house Wydawnictwo Literat Andrzej Chmielewski Międzyrzecz, ISBN 978-83-933003-3-4
- MRU Historia i Współczesność (2013), publishing house Wydawnictwo Literat Andrzej Chmielewski Międzyrzecz, ISBN 978-83-933003-6-5
- 1945 Bledzew – zapomniana bitwa, seria Germania, część 3 (2014), publishing house Wydawnictwo Literat Andrzej Chmielewski Międzyrzecz, ISBN 978-83-933003-7-2
- 1945 Przełamanie MRU, seria Germania, część 4 (2014), publishing house Wydawnictwo Literat Andrzej Chmielewski Międzyrzecz, ISBN 978-83-933003-8-9
- Jeziora i lasy powiatu Międzyrzeckiego (2015), publishing house Wydawnictwo Literat Andrzej Chmielewski Międzyrzecz, ISBN 978-83-936645-1-1
- Między Lagow a Łagowem, seria Germania, część 6 (2016), publishing house Wydawnictwo Literat Andrzej Chmielewski Międzyrzecz, ISBN 978-83-936645-2-8
- 1945 Politzig blutige Falle (translation W. Gladisch), series Germania (2015), Kraków, ISBN 978-83-936645-3-5
- 600 lat Wierzbna (2016), publishing house Wydawnictwo Literat Andrzej Chmielewski Międzyrzecz, ISBN 978-83-936645-7-3
- Przyroda okolic Międzyrzecza (2016), publishing house Wydawnictwo Literat Andrzej Chmielewski Międzyrzecz, ISBN 978-83-936645-9-7
- Z Polską w sercu - wspomnienia skwierzyńskich pionierów, seria Germania część 7 (2018), publishing house Wydawnictwo Literat Andrzej Chmielewski Międzyrzecz, ISBN 978-83-946875-3-3
- Przyroda i turystyka Gminy Przytoczna (2018), publishing house Wydawnictwo Literat Andrzej Chmielewski Międzyrzecz, ISBN 978-83-946875-0-2
- Wspomnienia z ziemi bledzewskiej, seria Germania, część 7 (2020), publishing house Wydawnictwo Literat Andrzej Chmielewski Międzyrzecz, ISBN 978-83-946875-9-5:
- 1944 Przytoczna powietrzne starcie/1944 Przytoczna Air Battle/1944 Przytoczna Luftkampf (translation K. Sztuba-Frąckowiak) (2021), Kraków ISBN 978-83-66527-24-9
- Gdy przybyli Rosjanie/Der Einmarsch der Russen (traducción K. Sztuba-Frąckowiak), seria Germania, część 8 (2022), publishing house Wydawnictwo Literat Andrzej Chmielewski Międzyrzecz, ISBN 978-83-946875-6-4 (co author: K. Sztuba-Frąckowiak)

=== Albums ===
- Album Międzyrzecz na dawnych pocztówkach/Meseritz auf alten Postkarten I. (2011), publishing house Wydawnictwo Literat Andrzej Chmielewski Między-rzecz, ISBN 978-83-925864-6-3
- Album Międzyrzecz na dawnych pocztówkach wydanie II (2011), publishing house Wydawnictwo Literat Andrzej Chmielewski Międzyrzecz, ISBN 978-83-925864-7-0
- Album Międzyrzecz na starych pocztówkach/Meseritz auf alten Ansichtskarten II. (2011), publishing house Wydawnictwo Literat Andrzej Chmielewski Mię-dzyrzecz, ISBN 978-83-925864-9-4
- Album Kostrzyn na dawnych pocztówkach/Küstrin auf alten Ansichtskarten (2012), publishing house Wydawnictwo Literat Andrzej Chmielewski Między-rzecz, ISBN 978-83-933003-0-3
- Świętoszów na starych pocztówkach/Neuhammer am Queis auf alten Ansichts-karten (2014), publishing house Wydawnictwo Literat Andrzej Chmielewski Międzyrzecz, ISBN 978-83-933003-9-6
- Album Międzyrzecz na starych pocztówkach/Meseritz auf alten Ansichtskarten II. (2011), publishing house Wydawnictwo Literat Andrzej Chmielewski Mię-dzyrzecz, ISBN 978-83-925864-9-4
- Album Kostrzyn na dawnych pocztówkach/Küstrin auf alten Ansichtskarten (2012), publishing house Wydawnictwo Literat Andrzej Chmielewski Między-rzecz, ISBN 978-83-933003-0-3
- Dawny Międzyrzecz na kolorowych pocztówkach/Meseritz auf alten farbigen Postkarten (2012), ISBN 978-83-933003-2-7
- Gmina Międzyrzecz na dawnych widokówkach/Gemeinde Meseritz auf alten Postkarten (2013), publishing house Wydawnictwo Literat Andrzej Chmielew-ski Międzyrzecz, ISBN 978-83-933003-4-1
- Witnica na starych pocztówkach/Vietz a. Ostbahn auf alten Ansichtskarten (2013), publishing house Wydawnictwo Literat Andrzej Chmielewski Między-rzecz, ISBN 978-83-933003-5-8
- Skwierzyna na dawnych pocztówkach/Skwierzyna auf den alten Postkarten/Skwierzyna in Old Postcards (2017), publishing house Wydawnic-two Literat Andrzej Chmielewski Międzyrzecz, ISBN 978-83-946875-1-9
- Gmina Bledzew na dawnych pocztówkach (2019), publishing house Wydawnic-two Literat Andrzej Chmielewski Międzyrzecz, ISBN 978-83-946875-7-1
