= Stefan Franczak =

Stefan Franczak (August 3, 1917, in Jeziorna, Łódź Voivodeship, Poland – 2009) was a Polish Jesuit and horticulturist, famous as a clematis breeder.

In 2009, President of Poland awarded Franczak with Commander's Cross of the order Polonia Restituta for his "outstanding achievements in the field of breeding of ornamental plants and of his contribution to international horticultural advancement".
