= Reinhold Smyczek =

Polish military officer and activist (1918–1994)

Reinhold W. Smyczek (August 18, 1918 – May 18, 1994) was a Polish military officer and an émigré political activist.

== Decorations ==
- 1945 : Silver Cross of the Order Virtuti Militari by the Polish Government in Exile
- 1981: Knight's Cross of the Order of Polonia Restituta
- 1986: Officer's Cross of the Order of Polonia Restituta "for the work dedicated to independence and national treasure"
- 1994 Commander's Cross of the Order of Merit of the Republic of Poland (posthumously)
