= Krzysztof Skowroński =

Polish journalist

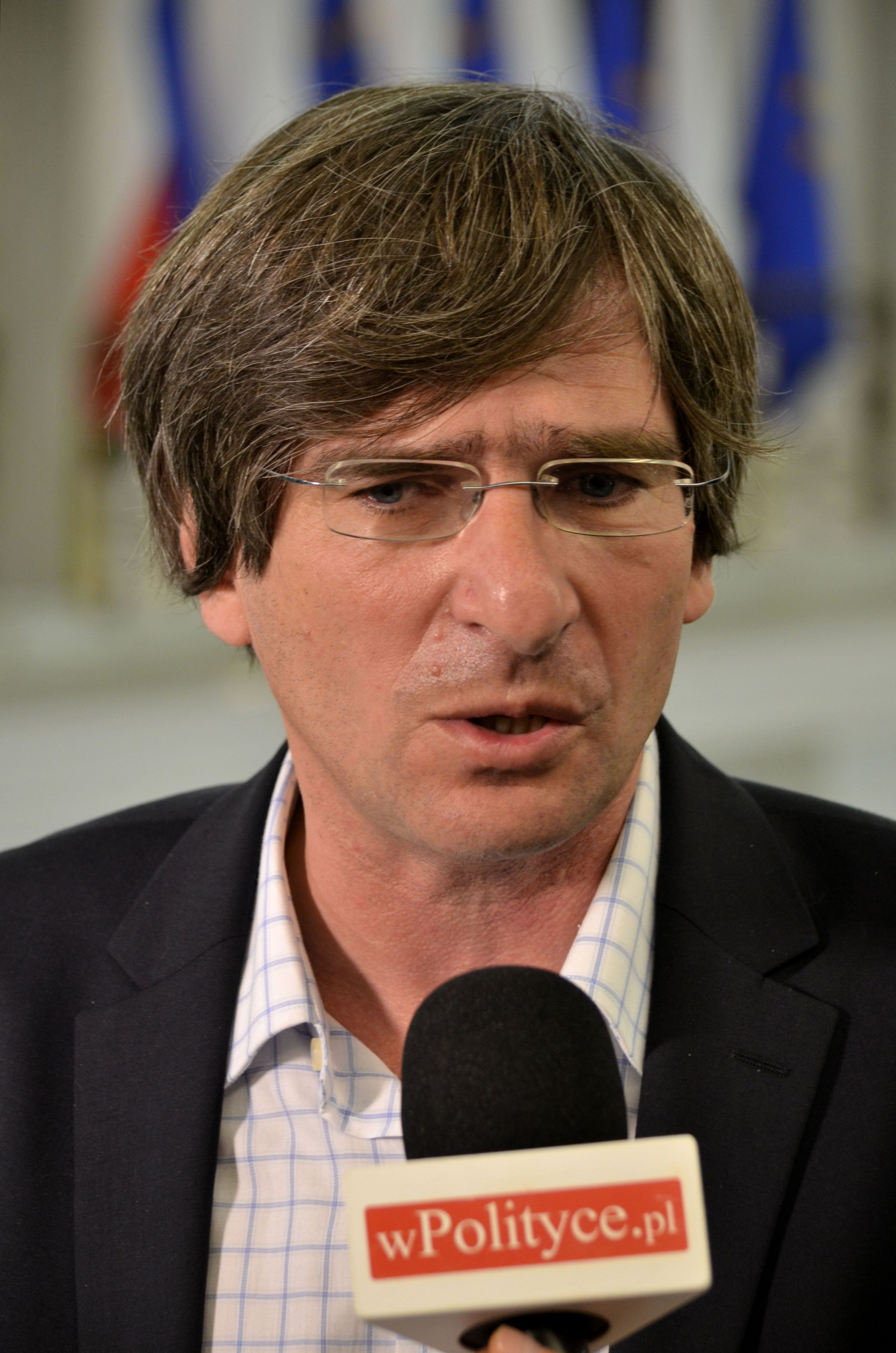
Krzysztof Skowroński

Krzysztof Konrad Skowroński is a Polish journalist and the former director of Program 3 in Polish Radio.
