= State Committee for Scientific Research =

State Committee for Scientific Research in Poland (Polish: Komitet Badań Naukowych - KBN) was an organisational unit operating 1991 to 2005 as the supreme authority within the Ministry of Science and Higher Education regarding State policy in the field of science and technology.

The idea of creating the Committee was born in the academic democratic opposition circles associated with the Solidarity trade union, notably professors Stefan Amsterdamski, Witold Karczewski and Klemens Szaniawski. The institution was created as a successor to the dissolved Bureau of Scientific and Technical Progress and Implementation, which existed between 1984 and 1991. Two main goals for the reform were stated by Amsterdamski, who was tasked with the formation of the Committee as part of Tadeusz Mazowiecki's cabinet: restructuring the existing socialist system of research organization (based around universities, the Polish Academy of Sciences and independent R&D units) and funding (abandoning widespread public funding of applied research and limiting it to basic research). The underlying aim was the adjustment of the science sector to ongoing market reforms through shock therapy. In 1991 the share of government expenditure on research was 2.5%, which fell to a historically low 1.6% in just four years after the reform.

One of its major tasks was distribution of funds for scientific research among Polish universities, research institutes and other scientific institutions.

In 2005, it was closed and replaced by the Science Council, and in 2010 by National Centre for Research and Development.
