= Orders, decorations, and medals of Poland =

The following is a list of medals, awards and decorations in use in Poland. Most of them are awarded by the Polish Army, but some are civilian decorations that may be worn by the military personnel.

Most of these decorations ceased to be awarded; some were awarded before World War II only, and some in the People's Republic of Poland only; order of some of them was changed by law.

The state awards may be awarded only by the President of Poland. The order of precedence was last reformed in 2007. The order of precedence is: 6 orders (order) in specific order of precedence (see table below); other orders in order they were received; 12 crosses (krzyż), 3 medals (medal) and 6 stars (gwiazda) in specific order of precedence; other crosses and awards in order they were received.

== National orders ==
Order of the White Eagle	Order of Polonia Restituta	Order of the Cross of Independence	Order of Merit of the Republic of Poland

== Military orders ==
Order Virtuti Militari	Order of the Military Cross

== Currently recognized state awards subject to order of precedence ==
Award	I class	II class	III class	IV class	V class	Description	Established in
Order of the White Eagle; Order Orła Białego						Poland's highest decoration awarded to both civilians and the military for their merits.	1705
Virtuti Militari						Poland's highest military decoration for valor in the face of the enemy	1792
Order of Polonia Restituta; Order Odrodzenia Polski; Order of Poland Reborn						Awarded to both civilians and the military for their merits.	1921
Order of Military Cross; Order Krzyża Wojskowego						Awarded to military personnel for actions in peacetime.	2006
Order of the Cross of Independence; Order Krzyża Niepodległości						Awarded for struggle for independence in 1939-1956 period.	2010
Order of Merit of the Republic of Poland; Order Zasługi Rzeczypospolitej Polskiej						Awarded to foreigners for contributing to good foreign relations.	1990
Other orders in the order they were received.							
Cross of Valour; Krzyż Walecznych						Polish military decoration awarded to a person who "has demonstrated deeds of valor and courage on the battlefield."	1920
Military Cross; Krzyż Wojskowy						Combat decoration, conferred to a military, irrespective of rank and service for combat valor against an act of terror in the territory of Poland or while on a mission of the Armed Forces overseas.	2007
Cross of Merit for Bravery; Krzyż Zasługi za Dzielność						For recognition of military or police personnel.	1928
Gold Cross of Merit with Swords; Złoty Krzyż Zasługi z Mieczami						Awarded for deeds of bravery and valor not connected with direct fight, as well as for merit rendered in perilous circumstances.	1942
Cross of Freedom and Solidarity; Krzyż Wolności i Solidarności						Awarded to members of anti-communist opposition movement in PRL.	2010
Virtus et Fraternitas Medal; Medal Virtus et Fraternitas						For those who keep remembrance about people of Polish nationality or Polish citizens of other nationalities who are victims of Soviet crimes, Nazi German crimes, nationalist crimes or other crimes against peace, humanity or war crimes, in the period from November 8, 1917, until July 31, 1990.	2017
Gold Cross of Merit; Złoty Krzyż Zasługi						Civil state award established to recognize services to the state.	1923
Silver Cross of Merit with Swords; Srebrny Krzyż Zasługi z Mieczami						Awarded for deeds of bravery and valor not connected with direct fight, as well as for merit rendered in perilous circumstances.	1942
Silver Cross of Merit; Srebrny Krzyż Zasługi						Civil state award established to recognize services to the state.	1923
Bronze Cross of Merit with Swords; Brązowy Krzyż Zasługi z Mieczami						Awarded for deeds of bravery and valor not connected with direct fight, as well as for merit rendered in perilous circumstances.	1942
Bronze Cross of Merit; Brązowy Krzyż Zasługi						Civil state award established to recognize services to the state.	1923
Military Cross of Merit with Swords; Air Force Cross of Merit with Swords; Navy Cross of Merit with Swords; Wojskowy Krzyż Zasługi z Mieczami; Lotniczy Krzyż Zasługi z Mieczami; Morski Krzyż Zasługi z Mieczami						Conferred for meritorious service in combat operations against acts of terrorism at home or during military missions overseas.	2007
Military Cross of Merit; Air Force Cross of Merit; Navy Cross of Merit; Wojskowy Krzyż Zasługi; Lotniczy Krzyż Zasługi; Morski Krzyż Zasługi						Bestowed for outstanding non-combat meritorious achievement or service.	2007
Saint Florian's Cross; Krzyż Świętego Floriana						Awarded to outstanding and distinguished members of the Voluntary Fire Service.	2021
Medal for Sacrifice and Courage; Medal za Ofiarność i Odwagę						Civil award for risking one's life to save another's.	1960
Medal for Long Service; Medal za Długoletnią Służbę						Conferred for long service in the armed forces, police, fire service, education, justice, central or local administration; awarded for 30, 20 and 10 years of service respectively	1938, reactivated in 2007
Medal for Long Marital Life; Medal Za Długoletnie Pożycie Małżeńskie						For a marriage lasting 50 years or more.	1960
Stars; Gwiazdy						Afghanistan Star (for service in Afghanistan; since 2002) Iraq Star (for service in Iraq; 2003–2008) Chad Star (for service in EUFOR Tchad/RCA and MINURCAT; 2008–2009) Congo Star (for service in EUFOR RD Congo; 2006) Mediterranean Sea Star (for service in Active Endeavour; since 2005) Air Crew Star (for service, inter alia, in Baltic Air Policing; since 2005)	2008 (2); 2010 (3); 2012 (1)
Decoration of Honour for Officers and Other Ranks for Wounds and Injuries Odznaka honorowa dla Oficerów i Szeregowych za Rany i Kontuzje						Awarded to any military, irrespective of rank or branch of service for a wound or injury sustained in action against an enemy in defense of the country.	1920
Other crosses and awards in the order they were received.							

== Presidential awards ==
Award	I class	II class	III class	Description	Established in
Siberian Exiles Cross; Krzyż Zesłańców Sybiru				For deported to Siberia, Kazakhstan and northern Russia by the Soviet regime after September 17, 1939, as well to their children who were born there	2003
Eastern Cross; Krzyż Wschodni				For foreigners who helped and saved Polish citizens in 1917-1991 period in former Polish territory and Soviet Union	2016
Western Cross; Krzyż Zachodni				For foreigners who helped and saved Polish citizens in 1939-1989 period in opposition to German occupants (during World War II) and Polish communist government (after war)	2017
Medal of the Centenary of Regained Independence; Medal Stulecia Odzyskanej Niepodległości				For Polish citizens who contributed to the regaining or strengthening of the sovereignty of the Republic of Poland, including, in particular, the building of a Polish citizens' community and a sense of national identity, development of science, praising the good name of Poland through culture and art, social development and strengthening ties with Poles abroad and building the economic prosperity of the state.	2018

== Ministerial awards ==
Award	I class	II class	III class	IV class	Description	Established in
Medal of the Armed Forces in the Service of the Fatherland; Medal Siły Zbrojne w Służbie Ojczyzny					For Polish military personnel awarded for long service in the Polish armed forces	1951. Ministry of Defence award since 2008.
Medal of Merit for National Defence; Medal Za Zaslugi dla Obronnosci Kraju					Presented to Polish military personnel and civilian employees for meritorious activities to strengthen military power of the country.	1966 and revised 1991
Polish Army Medal; Medal Wojska Polskiego					Services to the Polish armed forces by foreign civilian and military personnel	1999
Medal of Merit for Firefighting Medal Za Zasługi dla Pożarnictwa					For outstanding achievements in the fire brigade	1952
Medal of Merit for Police; Medal za Zasługi dla Policji					For outstanding achievements	2001
Medal of Merit for the Border Guard; Medal za Zasługi dla Straży Granicznej						2004
Medal of the National Education Commission; Medal Komisji Edukacji Narodowej					Outstanding contribution to education	1967
Medal for Merit to Culture; Medal Zasłużony Kulturze Gloria Artis					Distinguished contributions to the Polish culture and heritage.	2006
Decoration of Honor "Meritorious for Polish Culture"; Odznaka honorowa Zasłużony dla Kultury Polskiej					Distinguished contributions to the Polish culture and heritage.	1969
Decoration of Honor "Bene Merito"; Odznaka Honorowa "Bene Merito"					For activities aiming at strengthening of the position of Poland on the international arena.	2009
Decoration of Honor "For Merit In Actions Outside the Republic of Poland"; Odznaka Honorowa "Za zasługi w działaniach poza granicami RP"					For merits of personnel of Police, Firefighters, BOR and Border Guard during service abroad.	2011 (in general); 2013 (detailed)
Badge of Honour of the Polish Red Cross Odznaka Honorowa Polskiego Czerwonego Krzyża					for merits in the implementation of the humanitarian goals of the Polish Red Cross	1927
Pro Patria Medal; Medal Pro Patria					For special merits in cultivating the memory of the struggle for the independence of the Polish	2011
Pro Memoria Medal; Medal Pro Memoria					For outstanding contributions in perpetuating the memory of the people and deeds in the struggle for Polish independence during World War II	2005
Decoration of Honor "For Merit To Human Rights Protection"; Odznaka honorowa "Za Zasługi dla Ochrony Praw Człowieka"					For extraordinary achievements in defense of human rights.	2009
Decoration of Honor "For Merits to the Rights of the Child Protection"; Odznaka Honorowa za Zasługi dla Ochrony Praw Dziecka					For extraordinary achievements in defense of the Rights of the Child.	2013
Guardian Medal of the Places of National Remembrance; Medal Opiekuna Miejsc Pamięci Narodowej					Special merits in promoting the idea of national memory and the distinctive activities of the commemoration of struggle and martyrdom of the Polish Nation	1976

== Former awards ==
Award	I class	II class	III class	IV class	V class	Description	Established in
Order of Saint Stanislaus Order Św. Stanisława Biskupa i Męczennika Орден Святого Станислава							1765
Cross of Independence with Swords; Krzyż Niepodległości z Mieczmi							1930
Cross of Independence; Krzyż Niepodległości							1930
Medal of Independence; Medal Niepodległości							1930
Krzyż Ochotniczy za Wojnę 1918-1921; Volunteer Cross for War 1918-1921							1939
Krzyż na Śląskiej Wstędze Waleczności i Zasługi; Cross on Silesian Ribbon of Valour and Merit							1921
Cross of Military Merits of Central Lithuania							1922
Medal za Ratowanie Ginących; Life Saving Medal							1928
Army Medal for War 1939-45; Medal Wojska za Wojnę 1939-45							1945
Air Force Medal for War 1939-45; Medal Lotniczy za Wojnę 1939-45							1945
Navy Medal for War 1939-45; Medal Morski za Wojnę 1939-45							1945
Merchant Marine Medal for War 1939-45; Medal Morski PMH za Wojnę 1939-45							1945
Krzyż Monte Cassino; Cross of Monte Cassino							1944
Krzyż Armii Krajowej; Home Army Cross							1966
Medal Pamiątkowy za Wojnę 1918-1921 Commemorative Medal for War of 1918-1921							1928
Medal 10-lecia Niepodległości Medal of the 10th Anniversary of Independence							1928
Medal of 3rd of May Medal 3 maja							1925
Order of the Builders of People's Poland; Order Budowniczych Polski Ludowej						Highest civil decoration of the People's Republic of Poland.	1949-1992
Order of the Cross of Grunwald; Order Krzyża Grunwaldu						Awarded by the Gwardia Ludowa for acts of heroism in armed combat with the German occupiers for fighting for freedom and Polish Independence.	1943-1992
Order of the Banner of Work; Order Sztandaru Pracy						Awarded for unique achievements for the Nation and the Country.	1949-1992
Zasłużonym na Polu Chwały; For Merits in Field of Glory							1943-1992
Odznaka „Za Zasługi dla Obrony Cywilnej” Medal "Merit for the Civil Defence"							1976
Odznaka „Za zasługi w ochronie porządku publicznego” Medal for "Merit in defending public							1971
Medal „Za udział w walkach w obronie władzy ludowej” “For combat in defense of the Peoples Power”							1983
Krzyż Kampanii Wrześniowej Cross of the September Campaign							1984-1992
Partisan Cross; Krzyż Partyzancki							1945
Krzyż Oświęcimski; Auschwitz Cross							1985
Za waszą wolność i naszą For our freedom and yours							1956
Za Udział w Wojnie Obronnej 1939; For Defence War 1939							1981
Za Udział w Walkach w Obronie Władzy Ludowej; For Fighting in defence of People's Rule							1983
Śląski Krzyż Powstańczy; Cross for Silesian Uprisings							1946
Wielkopolski Krzyż Powstańczy; Cross for Great Poland Uprising							1957
Warszawski Krzyż Powstańczy; Cross for the Warsaw Uprising							1981
Medal Za Warszawę 1939-1945; For Warsaw 1939-1945							1945
Medal za Odrę, Nysę i Bałtyk; For Odra, Nysa and Baltic							1945
Medal Zwycięstwa i Wolności; For Victory and Freedom							1945
Medal Za Udział w Walkach o Berlin; For Battle of Berlin							1966
Medal of the 10th Anniversary of People's Poland							1954
Medal of the 30th Anniversary of People's Poland							1974
Medal of the 40th Anniversary of People's Poland							1984
General Bułak-Bałachowicz's Army Cross of Valor							1917
Civil awards that can be worn on a military uniform without requiring the approval of one's superiors.
Krzyż harcerski Scouting cross	None miniature worn instead						

== See also ==
- List of military decorations
- Krzyż Powstania Warszawskiego
- Polish Armed Forces
- History of Poland
