= Grzegorz Kaliciak (officer) =

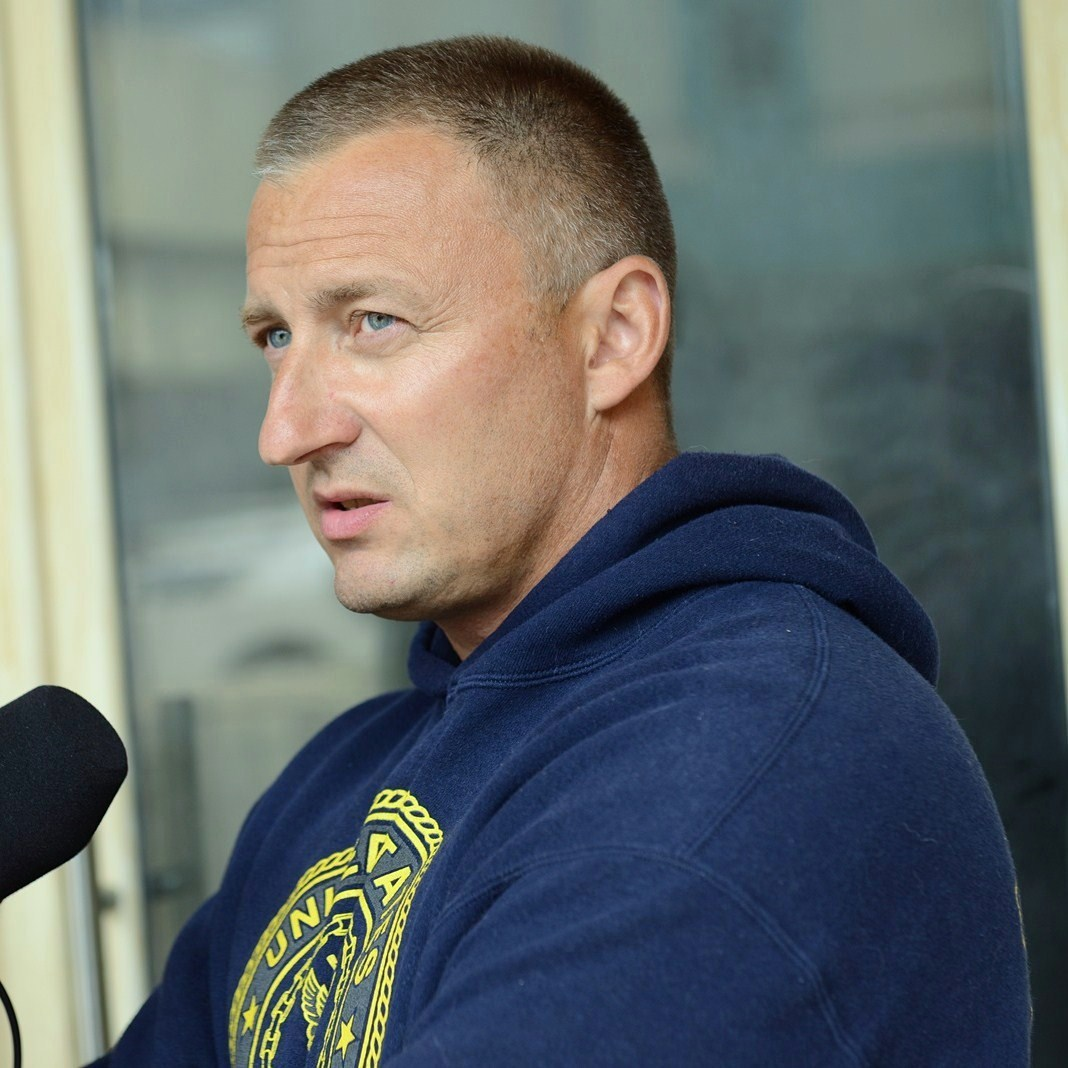
- Born: Grzegorz Seweryn Kaliciak; 23 March 1973 (age 53); Prudnik
- Allegiance: Poland
- Branch: Polish Armed Forces
- Service years: 1993–2025
- Rank: General
- Conflicts: 2003 invasion of Iraq: Defense of Karbala City Hall; Battle of Najaf (2004); War in Afghanistan
- Awards: List of awards: Order of the Military Cross; Military Cross (Poland); Cross of Merit for Bravery (Poland); Iraq Star; Afghanistan Star; Medal of the Armed Forces in the Service of the Fatherland; Medal of the Centenary of Regained Independence; Odznaka Skoczka Spadochronowego Wojsk Powietrznodesantowych; Wojskowa Odznaka Sprawności Fizycznej; Odznaka Honorowa Wojsk Lądowych; Złota odznaka tytułu honorowego "Zasłużony Żołnierz RP"; Odznaka pamiątkowa 17 WBZ; Medal Pamiątkowy Wielonarodowej Dywizji Centrum-Południe w Iraku; Nagroda "Buzdygan" – Żołnierz Roku 2009; NATO Medal

Grzegorz Seweryn Kaliciak (born 23 March 1973) is a General of Polish Armed Forces.

== Life ==
Grzegorz Kaliciak was born in Prudnik as a son of Franciszek Kaliciak and his wife Władysława, worker of ZPB "Frotex". He was raised by his mother and his grandmother. He attended Zespół Szkół Rolniczych in Prudnik and Tadeusz Kościuszko Land Forces Military Academy in Wrocław.

He started his military service in 4 Battalion Rozpoznawczy in Wędrzyn. He was promoted to the rank of captain in 1999. During the invasion of Iraq he served in PKW Irak. He was a commander of Polish forces during the defense of City Hall in Karbala. He also served in Task Force White Eagle in Afghanistan.

He's an author of a book "Karbala. Raport z obrony City Hall", which was published in 2015. The character Kalicki from the film Karbala is based on him.

== Awards ==
- Order of the Military Cross (2009)
- Military Cross (2015)
- Cross of Merit for Bravery
- Iraq Star
- Afghanistan Star
- Medal of the Armed Forces in the Service of the Fatherland
- Bronze Medal of Merit for National Defence
- Medal of the Centenary of Regained Independence (2019)
- Odznaka Skoczka Spadochronowego Wojsk Powietrznodesantowych
- Wojskowa Odznaka Sprawności Fizycznej
- Odznaka Honorowa Wojsk Lądowych
- Złota odznaka tytułu honorowego "Zasłużony Żołnierz RP" I stopnia (2017)
- Odznaka pamiątkowa 17 WBZ
- Medal Pamiątkowy Wielonarodowej Dywizji Centrum-Południe w Iraku
- Nagroda "Buzdygan" – Żołnierz Roku 2009
- NATO Medal
