= Jacek Siewiera =

Polish politician, officer and medical doctor

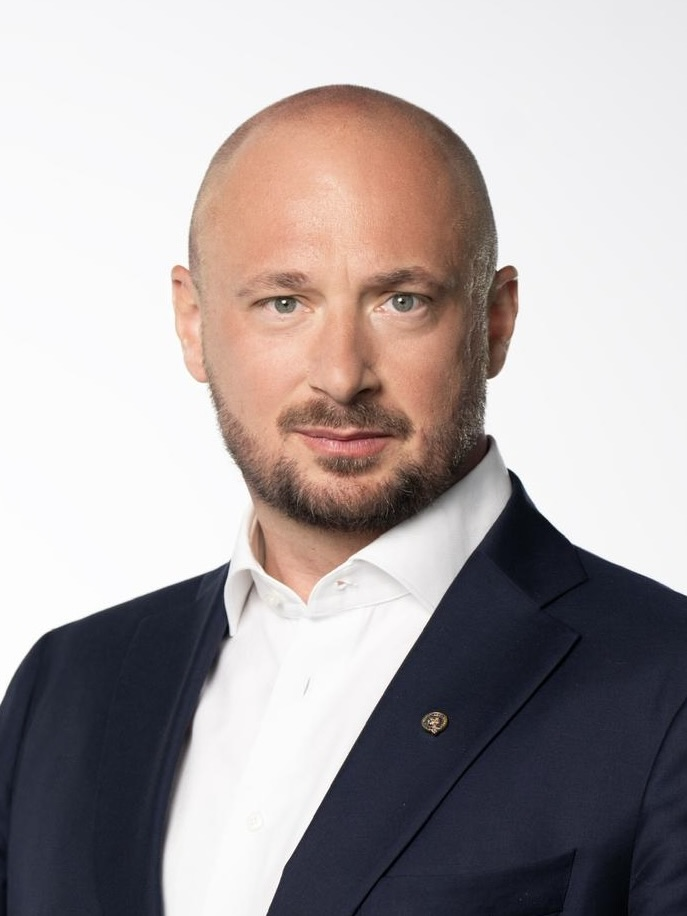
- Born: 27 April 1984 (age 42); Wrocław, Poland
- Allegiance: Poland
- Branch: Polish Land Forces
- Rank: Podpułkownik
- Awards: Medal for Sacrifice and Courage; Cross of Merit for Bravery (Poland); Illinois Military Medal of Merit; Community Service Medal (United Arab Emirates)
- Education: Wrocław Medical University; University of Wrocław; University of Oxford

Jacek Zdzisław Siewiera (born April 27, 1984 in Wrocław) is a Polish army officer, medical doctor and a lawyer. He is an expert in anaesthesiology and intensive therapy and a University of Oxford alumnus, was the organizer and first head of the Hyperbaric Medicine Clinic of the Military Medical Institute, the founder of the Rescue Center, head of the National Security Bureau of Poland from 2022 to 2025. He is currently a senior fellow at the Atlantic Council and a member of the REDI Task Force - Reimagining European Defense Initiative.

== Education and career ==
He completed full-time studies at the faculty of medicine of the Piastów Śląskich Medical University in Wrocław and five-year part-time studies in law at the Faculty of Law and Economics of the University of Wrocław and doctoral studies at the Forensic Medicine Chair of the Medical University in Wrocław. After defense of doctoral dissertation at the Forensic Medicine Chair of the Piastów Śląskich Medical University in Wrocław he started military service. He is the author of the first textbook in Poland dedicated to limitations of life support technologies, titled Futile treatment: for medical doctors and lawyers. Then he commenced studies in the area of strategy and innovation at the University of Oxford and graduated with distinction.

In 2012 he was awarded the Medal for Sacrifice and Courage by the President of the Republic of Poland Bronisław Komorowski upon request of the Voivode of Lower Silesia Region for merit in saving human lives (for actions undertaken during the disaster within the premises of the Katowice International Fair in 2006).

In 2017 in the Clinical Ward of Hyperbaric Medicine of the Military Medical Institute, which he established, he undertook a rescue hyperbaric treatment of a pilot of a MIG29 fighter jet, which failed during flight. This was the world's first publicized case of successful recovery from high-altitude decompression sickness owing to hyperbaric treatment and cardiopulmonary bypass. The treatment procedure entailed a risk to the medical doctor's life and health, for which in 2018 he was awarded with the Cross of Merit for Bravery by the President of the Republic of Poland, Andrzej Duda, and also with the "Portrait of Polish Medicine”. As a result of actions aimed to combat the SARS CoV2 epidemic in the period of peak incidence of COVID-19 infections in the United States, he was awarded with the Illinois Military Medal of Merit.

On October 11, 2022 President Andrzej Duda appointed him to the position of Head of the National Security Bureau. In January 2025 he resigned from this position to accept the prestigious Clarendon Fund Scholarship at the University of Oxford.

In May 2025, Jacek Siewiera, who had previously served as head of President Andrzej Duda’s National Security Bureau, joined the presidential campaign of Rafał Trzaskowski, the pro‑European centrist mayor of Warsaw and leading opponent of Duda’s conservative camp, as a social advisor.<cite:1>

== Missions ==
- In 2020, during the COVID-19 pandemic he was the Commander of the Polish Military and Civilian Mission to Lombardy from March 30 to April 9, 2020, in the period of peak incidence of SARS-CoV-2 infections in Northern Italy.
- In April 2020 he was the Commander of the Polish Military Medical Mission to the United States deployed after a telephone conversation between President of Poland and President of the United States.

== Awards and distinctions ==
=== Orders and decorations ===
- Medal for Sacrifice and Courage (Poland, 2012)
- Cross of Merit for Bravery (Poland, 2019 and 2020)
- Bene Merito honorary distinction (Poland, 2020)
- Illinois Military Medal of Merit (USA, 2020)
- Commander's Grand Cross of the Order "For Merit to Lithuania" (Lithuania, 2023)
- First Class Commander of the White Rose of Finland (Finland, 2023)
- Community Service Medal (United Arab Emirates, 2023)
- Commander's Crossof the Order of Polonia Restituta (Poland, 2025)

=== Awards ===
- WIM Commemorative Badge
- WSOWL Graduate Badge
- Portrait of Polish Medicine (2019)
- Clarendon Scholarship oraz Lincoln College Award (2022)
- Organ Donor Badge (2023)
- Waterfalls Global Award (2023)
