= Military Cross (disambiguation) =

The Military Cross is a British military decoration for gallantry.

Military Cross may also refer to one of the following awards.

- Military Cross (Belgium), established 1885, awarded by the Belgian Armed Forces
- Military Cross (Poland), established 2007, a Polish decoration for soldiers and civilians

== See also ==
- Order of the Military Cross, Polish order established 2006
