= Navy Cross (disambiguation) =

The Navy Cross is the award granted by the United States Navy for valor starting in 1917.

Navy Cross may also refer to:

- Navy Cross (South Africa), the award granted by the South African Navy for valor between 1991 and 2003
- Navy Cross of Merit (Poland), the award granted by the Polish Navy for valor starting in 2007
