= Tadeusz Buk =

Polish military commander (1960-2010)

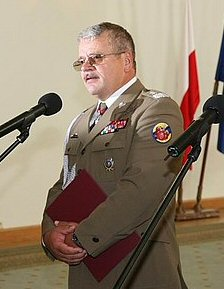
Tadeusz Buk

Tadeusz Buk (15 December 1960 – 10 April 2010) was a Polish military figure. He received numerous military and civil awards, including the Order of Polonia Restituta.

Buk was born at Mójcza. He served as commander of the Polish Land Forces until his death in the 2010 Polish Air Force Tu-154 crash near Smolensk.

== Education ==
Buk graduated from Juliusz Słowacki high school in Kielce. In 1984, he graduated from the Academy of Armed Forces Officers in Poznań.

== Military service ==
- In 1984, he joined the 29th Medium Tank Regiment in Żagań and served in this unit until 1991.
- In 1991, he enrolled at the Faculty of Land Forces of the National Defence Academy in Warsaw.
- Between 1993 and 1995, he served, inter alia, in the 18th Battalion Airborne assault and 6 Air Assault Brigade.
- From 1995 to 1998, he served in the 25th Air Cavalry Brigade in Tomaszów Mazowiecki.
- In 1999, after completing the annual post-graduate command post in the USA, he was appointed deputy commander of his unit.
- From 2002 to 2005, he served as commander of the 34th Armoured Cavalry Brigade in Zagan.
- In 2004 and 2005, he was deputy commander of Multinational Division Central-South in Iraq.
- Between 2005 and 2006, he was deputy director of the NATO Joint Force Training Centre in Bydgoszcz.
- From 2006 to 2007, he was Deputy Commanding General of the Combined Security Transition Command-Afghanistan.
- On 15 June 2007, Buk was appointed commander of 1st Mechanised Division of Warsaw.
- On 25 July 2007, he took command of the IX amendment NEC and Multinational Division Center-South in Iraq
- On 15 September 2009, he was appointed by President Lech Kaczyński to commander of the Army.
- On 10 April 2010, he died in the presidential plane crash near Smolensk.

== Awards and decorations ==
- Commander's Cross of the Order of Polonia Restituta (2010, posthumously)
- Knight's Cross of the Order of Polonia Restituta (2005)
- Commander's Cross of the Order of the Military Cross (2008)
- Silver Cross of Merit
- Bronze Cross of Merit
- Iraq Star
- Silver Medal in the Service of the Armed Forces of the Fatherland
- Silver Medal of Merit for National Defense
- Legion of Merit, Commander Degree (2008)
- Commemorative medal of the Multinational Division Central-South
- Badge of Merit for the Polish Veterans' Association and Former Political Prisoners (2008)

=== Military promotions ===
- 15 August 2004: promoted to the rank of brigadier general.
- 10 July 2007: promoted to the rank of major general.
