= Wound Decoration =

Decoration of Honour for Officers and Other Ranks for Wounds and Injuries
- Decoration for 3 wounds
- Awarded for: wound or injury in action against an enemy in defence of the country
- Presented by: Republic of Poland
- Eligibility: military
- Campaigns: Polish struggle for independence (1914–1921); Polish–Soviet War (1918–1921); II World War
- Established: July 14, 1920

The Decoration of Honour for Officers and Other Ranks for Wounds and Injuries (Polish: Odznaka honorowa dla Oficerów i Szeregowych za Rany i Kontuzje) – a Polish military award, established by the Council of National Defense on July 14, 1920, at the peak of the Polish–Soviet War and awarded to any military, irrespective of rank or branch of service for a wound or injury sustained in action against an enemy in defence of the country.

Eligible were all Polish military wounded or injured after November 1, 1918 or before that date, provided that the wound or injury had taken place while serving in the Polish Legions, 1st, 2nd or 3rd Polish Corps in Russia, Polish Army in France or in another Polish military formation recognized by the Republic. It was chronologically the second military honour of independent Poland, after the Order Virtuti Militari and before the Cross of Valour, which would be established a month later.

== Description ==
The decoration had the form of a blue ribbon bar with two narrow horizontal black stripes (the colours of Virtuti Militari). Each wound or injury was denoted by a five-pointed silver star on the ribbon. Up to three stars were worn on a single ribbon; if the number exceeded three, the remaining stars were placed on a second ribbon bar, worn above the first one. The ribbon bar was 1.5 – 1.8 cm high and 4 – 7 cm wide, depending on the number of stars. All wounds or injuries sustained in the same action counted as one. The badge was worn centrally above the upper left pocket of the tunic, above the first row of recipient's orders and medals or of their ribbon bars.

== World War II ==
The conferment and wearing of the decoration continued in the Polish Armed Forces in the West. The manner of wearing was slightly adjusted, so if a recipient had more than three stars, all were worn on a single, extended bar. Gen. Zygmunt Bohusz-Szyszko proudly wore the badge with six, and Gen. Władysław Anders with as many as eight stars. The badge continued to be worn also in the 1st and 2nd Polish Army in the Soviet Union. The decoration was worn by members of the Polish resistance in the occupied country and by soldiers during the Warsaw Uprising when conditions and security reasons allowed that.

== After World War II ==
Military Decoration for Wounds and Injuries – 1 wound (2012)

After the war the decoration was still worn by combatants, yet the tradition of wearing it began gradually to disappear, although it was never officially forbidden. An attempt to extend awarding to Polish servicemen and women wounded or injured while on an overseas mission (especially in Afghanistan and Iraq) was first made in the Polish Parliament in 2007 but failed then. Eventually, the badge for wounds during missions, named officially the Military Decoration for Wounds and Injuries (Wojskowa odznaka Za Rany i Kontuzje), was established as part of an Act on Military Veterans of August 19, 2011 and by Executive Order of March 15, 2012. The new badge has the same form as the original one, but the ribbon has been altered to dark blue with two horizontal crimson stripes (the colours of the Order of the Military Cross).
