= Cross of Freedom and Solidarity =

Cross of Freedom and Solidarity Krzyż Wolności i Solidarności
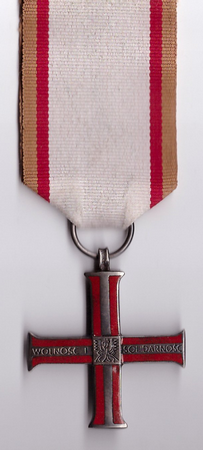
- Obverse
- Type: Commemorative decoration of merit
- Country: Poland
- Presented by: the President of Poland
- Status: Currently awarded
- Established: 5 August 2010
- Ribbon of the cross

Precedence
- Next (higher): Gold Cross of Merit with Swords
- Next (lower): Virtus et Fraternitas Medal
- Related: Order of the Cross of Independence; Cross of Independence

The Cross of Freedom and Solidarity (Krzyż Wolności i Solidarności) was established on 5 August 2010, to honor members of the democratic opposition in Poland who between the years 1956 and 1989 were killed, seriously wounded or injured, arrested, imprisoned or interned for at least 30 days, who lost jobs or were expelled from school or university for at least 6 months as a result of their activities for the benefit of a free and democratic Poland. Individuals who are found having collaborated with the communist regime may not be awarded.

== Design ==
The cross is a silver, red enameled Greek cross, similar to that of the Order of the Cross of Independence and the Cross of Independence of 1930. It is inscribed "WOLNOŚĆ I SOLIDARNOŚĆ" (freedom and solidarity) across the horizontal arms. In the center of the cross carved stylized image of the White Eagle. The reverse side of the cross is smooth. The cross is 42 mm in diameter.

The Cross of Freedom and Solidarity is suspended from a white ribbon, 38 mm wide. Symmetrically arranged along the edges of the ribbon are gold and crimson stripes each 3 mm wide.

== See also ==
- Polish awards and decorations
- Order of the Cross of Independence
- Cross of Independence
