= Army Medal for War (Poland) =

Army Medal for War Medal Wojska za Wojne
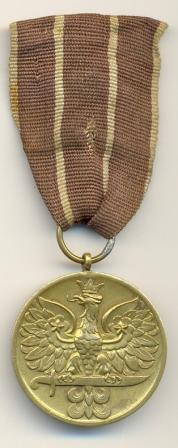
- Vintage Medal Wojska
- Type: Campaign medal
- Awarded for: 6 months of meritorious service with a unit engaged in military operations against an enemy, or a year service with another unit.
- Country: Poland
- Presented by: Polish Government in Exile
- Eligibility: All members of the Polish Ground Forces
- Campaign: World War II
- Established: 3 July 1945
- Ribbon bar of the medal showing first, second, third, and fourth awards.

Precedence
- Next (higher): Volunteer Cross for War
- Next (lower): Air Force Medal for War

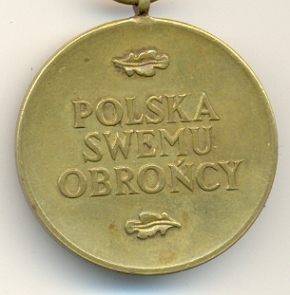
Reverse of the medal

The Army Medal for War (Polish: Medal Wojska za Wojne) was created in 1945 by the Polish government in Exile (in London) to reward members of the Polish ground forces for service during World War II. The eligibility criteria were: six months of operational service during World War II, or 12 months in a non-operational role. The medal could be conferred up to four times, although for a subsequent award the period of service was doubled.
