= Order of the Cross of Independence =

Cross of Independence Order of the Cross of Independence Order Krzyża Niepodległości
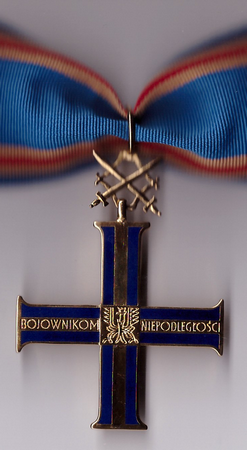
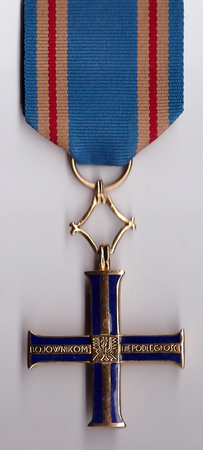
- Order 1st Class (top), and 2nd Class
- Type: Order with 2 classes
- Country: Poland
- Presented by: the President of Poland
- Status: Currently awarded
- Established: 5 August 2010
- Ribbon of the cross, 1st Class Ribbon of the cross, 2nd Class

Precedence
- Next (higher): Order of Military Cross
- Next (lower): Order of Merit of the Republic of Poland
- Related: Cross of Independence; Cross of Freedom and Solidarity

The Order of the Cross of Independence (Order Krzyża Niepodległości) was established on 5 August 2010, to honor those who between the years of 1939-1956 voluntarily served with merit in defending the independence of the Polish State. At its establishment it was declared to be a continuation of Cross of Independence which was established on 29 October 1930. It is fifth in the order of precedence of Polish awards and decorations.

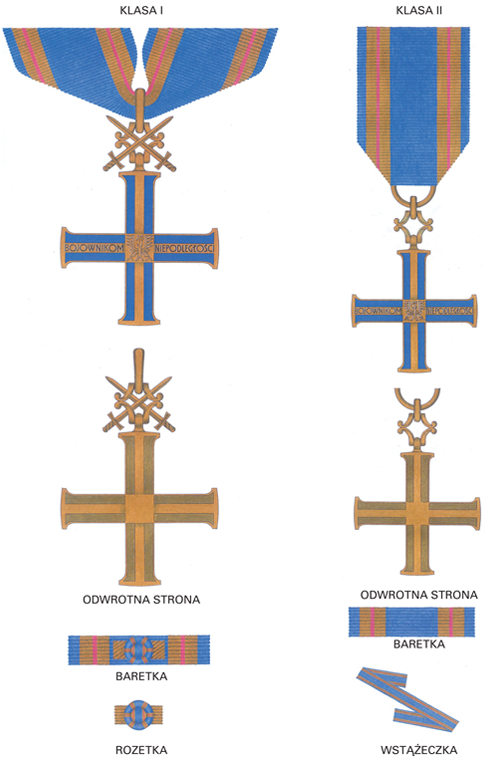
Drawing of the order 1st and 2nd class.

== Classes ==
The Order is divided into two classes. The first class cross of the Order of Independence is suspended by swords attached to a ribbon with a width of 45mm which is worn around the neck. The ribbon is blue with stripes of gold and red at the edges. The ribbon bar of the first class is denoted by a rosette at the center. The first class is awarded to those who guided the struggle or fought with arms for independence and sovereignty of the motherland with an extraordinary sacrifice. The second class cross of the Order of the Cross of Independence is worn on the left breast suspended from a ribbon with a width of 40 mm, with colors identical to that of the first class. The ribbon bar of the second class is unadorned by any clasp or attachment. The second class is awarded to those who for a significant period of time or in circumstances of extreme danger defended the independence and sovereignty of the homeland, fighting for her recovery, or maintaining the functioning of institutions and traditions of the Polish Republic.

== Recipients ==
On 28 February 2013 the first investiture of the order took place. Eight persons were awarded the order with swords and nineteen the order without swords.

== See also ==
- Polish awards and decorations
- Cross of Independence
- Cross of Freedom and Solidarity
