= Battle of Najaf (2004) =

2004 battle during the Iraq War

Coordinates: 31°59′45″N 44°18′52″E

- Part of the Iraq War
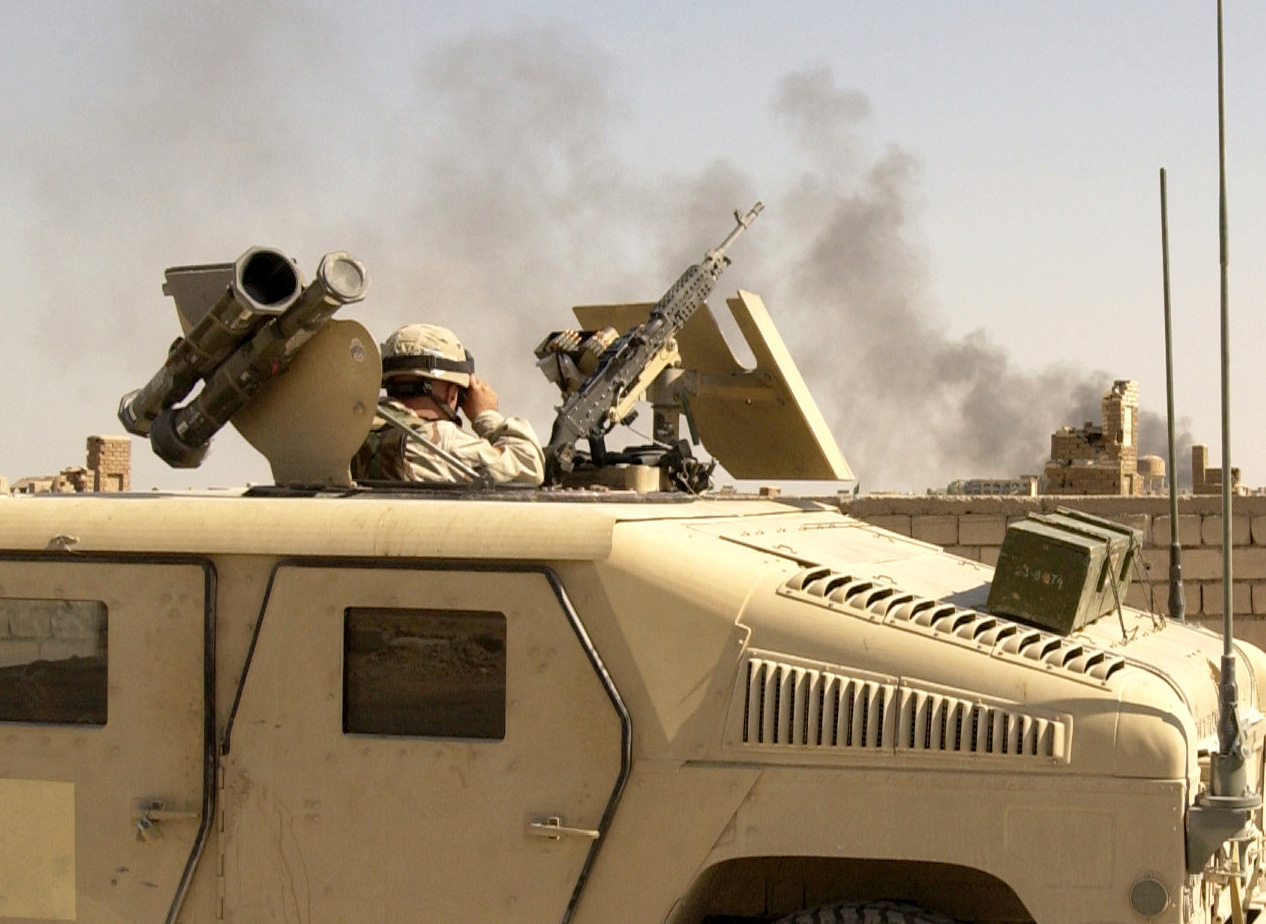
- U.S. Army soldier looks towards the sprawling An Najaf cemetery during the battle
Date	5–27 August 2004 (3 weeks and 1 day)
Location	Najaf, Iraq
Result	Coalition victory
Territorial changes	Iraqi forces control the city

Belligerents
United States; Iraq; United Kingdom; Australia; Poland; Spain retired later	Mahdi Army; 1920 Revolution Brigades

Commanders and leaders
Col. Anthony Haslam; Jim Dutton; Grzegorz Kaliciak	Muqtada al-Sadr

Units involved
United States Army; 1st Battalion, 4th Marine Regiment; British Army; Iraqi Ground Forces	No specific units

Strength
2,000 troops (Iraq) 1,800 security forces (United Kingdom) 1,000 troops (Australia) 100 troops (Poland) 90 troops	est. 1,400–1,500 militiamen

Casualties and losses
9 killed 100+ wounded 6 armoured vehicles damaged (Iraq) 40 killed 46 wounded (United Kingdom); 19 wounded (Poland) 5 killed 3 wounded	300 killed, 70 wounded (Mahdi Army claim); 1500+killed, 300 captured (coalition claim)

The Battle of Najaf a battle during the Iraq War between United States-Iraqi government forces and the Shia insurgent Mahdi Army led by Muqtada al-Sadr in the Iraqi city of Najaf in April 2004 and conflict began again in August 2004.

== Background ==
In April 2004, Blackwater private security contractors and elements of Air Naval Gunfire Liaison Company (ANGLICO) were involved in a pivotal battle against the Mahdi Army in Najaf, Iraq. The fighting on 4 April was part of a larger Shiite uprising and saw a small contingent of coalition forces repulse an attack by hundreds of militia members on the Coalition Provisional Authority (CPA) headquarters.

On 31 July 2004, the 11th Marine Expeditionary Unit, under the Polish-led Multinational Division Central-South (MND-CS), assumed operational control of An Najaf and Al-Qadisiyyah provinces from Task Force Dragon, which was composed of elements of the 1st Infantry Division. Task Force Dragon had earlier (June 2004) relieved the 2nd Armored Cavalry Regiment who had been extended twice in Iraq.

A platoon from the 66th Military Police company had been in Najaf since March and was one of the only American units in Najaf before this time. The platoon was working with the Iraqi Police to rebuild and train the police force in this area and was under siege along with soldiers from the El Salvadorian Army until the 2nd Armored Cavalry Regiment arrived.

On 2 August, the MEU and the Mahdi Army first exchanged fire. A patrol by Combined Anti-Armor Team (CAAT) Alpha, Weapons Company, 1st Battalion, 4th Marines (1/4) approached a maternity clinic located directly across the street from the home of Muqtada al-Sadr on the outskirts of the city. The clinic was in an area authorized for U.S. presence under a June cease-fire agreement brokered between coalition forces and Muqtada Sadr by the governor of Najaf, other local civic leaders, and the Bayt al-Shia, the informal council of senior Shia clerics.

The Marines reported over 70 enemy dead after nearly an hour of fighting. The Mahdi Army kept a steady resupply of men and weapons coming out of the Wadi-us-Salaam cemetery. CAAT Alpha faced mortars, rocket-propelled grenades (RPGs) and small arms fire with one Marine wounded until the unit ran low on ammunition. 1/4's Bravo Company was sent in on 7-ton trucks to provide covering fire for CAAT Alpha. Both sides withdrew to their respective strongholds soon afterwards.

Akram al-Kaabi, the founder and leader of Harakat Hezbollah al-Nujaba, said that the IRGC and Lebanese Hezbollah helped the militant forces of the Mahdi Army in this battle. He said that IRGC and Hezbollah officers were present on the ground and helped during the battle.

== Battle ==
Detachment Bravo played a pivotal combat role. Entering Iraq from Kuwait in late 2003, Bravo's Lightning One-Zero, Two-Zero, and Three-Zero teams undertook fire support missions in southern Iraq throughout 2003–2004. These teams engaged the Al-Mehdi Army, earning combat commendations and valor awards for their actions.

The Al-Mehdi uprising of 4 April 2004 provided the unit with its first major combat test. In An-Najaf, Lightning Two-Zero, consisting of seven Marines, was tasked as a Quick Reaction Force. During the defense of a Spanish garrison abandoned under militia assault, Captain Matthew Brannen and Staff Sergeant Derrick Leath coordinated the resistance. Over a three-week period, the team repelled repeated attacks and directed approximately twenty airstrikes, ensuring the compound's survival.

Recognition for heroism followed, with Bronze Stars with Combat "V" awarded to Major James R. Purmort II, Staff Sergeant Andre Rivera, Captain Brannen, and Staff Sergeant Leath. This engagement foreshadowed the larger-scale fighting in Najaf during the summer of 2004.

Throughout the Iraq conflict, detachments Alpha through Fox of 4th ANGLICO would serve in various combat capacities, while parallel deployments supported operations in Afghanistan. By 2007, ANGLICO had established itself as a specialized and indispensable combat asset, uniquely combining independence, coalition integration, and precision fire support for distributed operations.

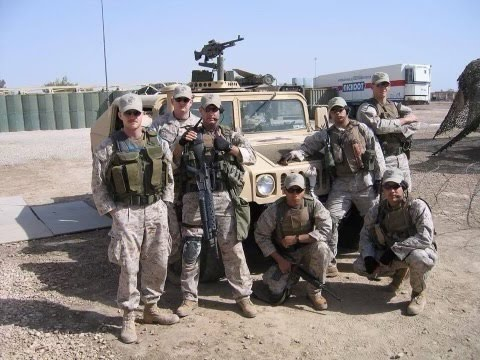
Det. Bravo Lightning 20 4th ANGLICO April 2004

On 5 August major conflict began again when the Mahdi Army attacked an Iraqi Police Station at 1 am. Their first attack was repelled but the Mahdi Army regrouped and attacked again at 3 am. Soon afterward, a quick reaction force from the Marine Expeditionary Unit was dispatched at the request of the governor of An Najaf.

Around 11 am the quick reaction force came under heavy machine gun and mortar fire from the Mahdi Army within the Wadi-us-Salaam, the largest cemetery in the Muslim world, approximately 7 miles squared. The cemetery has been layered over the centuries resulting in large underground tombs, tunnels and surface monuments, many reaching two stories tall. The combined U.S. Marine forces fought across this inhospitable terrain and under it in some of the first tunnel fighting seen since Vietnam.

A U.S. Marine UH-1N helicopter was shot down by small-arms fire on the second day of the fighting while conducting a close air support mission over enemy positions, the crew survived. Four U.S. military personnel were killed during the heavy street battles fought between the Mahdi Army and U.S. and Iraqi forces, until the MEU withdrew temporarily on 7 August. During the fighting, half a dozen U.S. Abrams tanks and Bradley fighting vehicles were damaged or disabled by insurgent RPG fire in the narrow streets.

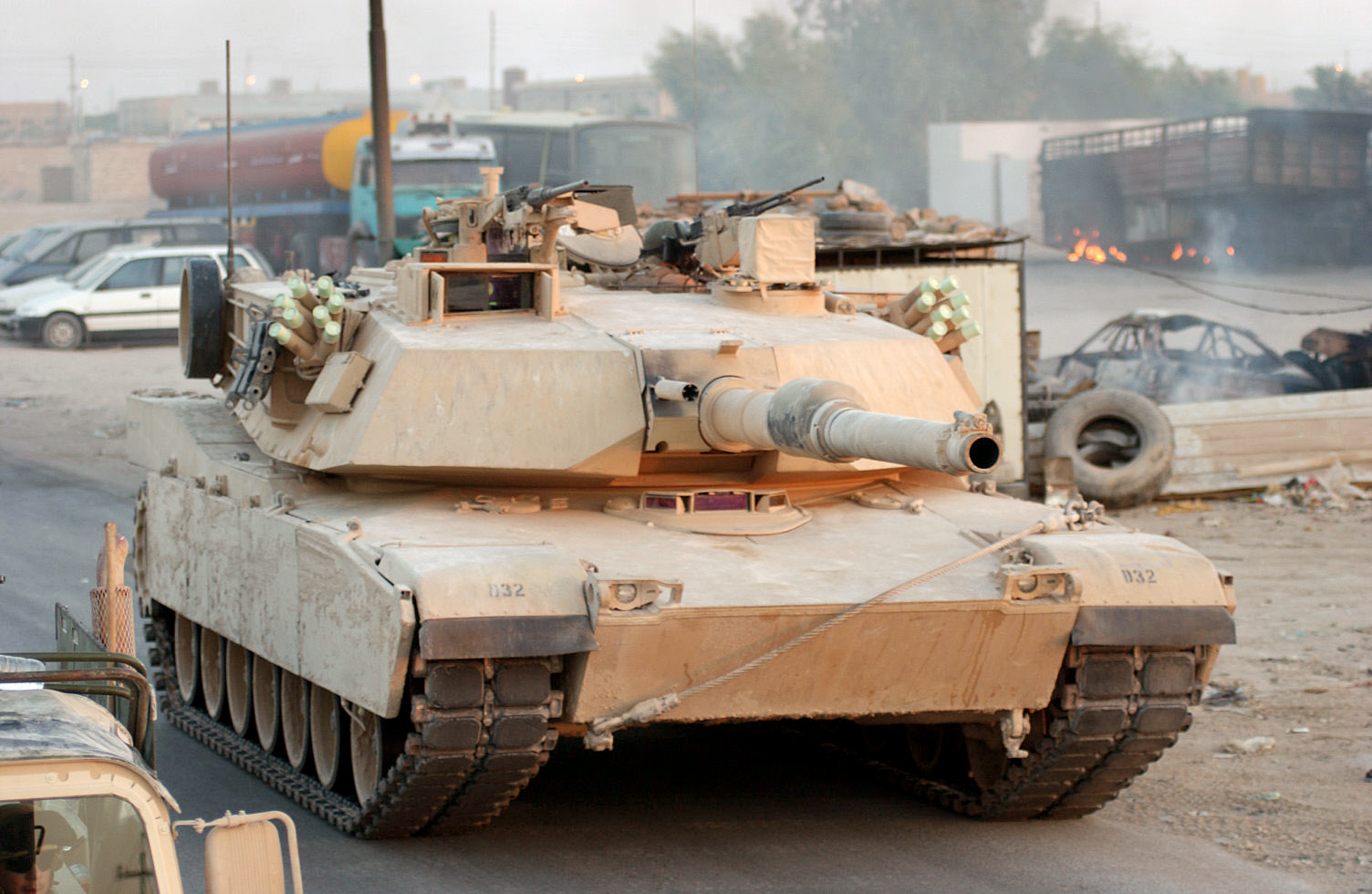
A United States 1st Marine Division M1 Abrams tank during a raid on the Muqtada Militia strong points in Najaf on 12 August

Fighting began in the city centre and then moved through the cemetery. After several days the fighting shifted to the environs of the Imam Ali Mosque when the Mahdi Army withdrew and took refuge there. 1st Blt 4th Marines encircled the complex after fighting through the Old City and began a siege. The Mahdi Army utilized large hotels that overlook the cemetery as overwatch machine gun positions.

U.S. Marines from Alpha and Bravo Co. 1/4 assaulted several of these hotels. After heavy hand to hand and room to room fighting the hotels were secured. The fighting damaged two of the minarets of the mosque, one of the holiest of all Shiite shrines. (Although neighboring buildings suffered considerable damage, the mosque itself suffered only superficial damage from stray bullets and shrapnel).

On 23 August, at least 15 explosions, many sounding like artillery shells, rocked the area, as shrapnel fell in the courtyard of the gold-domed mosque and gunfire echoed through the alleyways. On 26 August 2004, two F-16s flying out of Balad dropped four 2000 pound JDAMs (Joint Direct Attack Munitions) on two hotels near the shrine which were being used by the insurgents. The successful airstrike dealt a devastating blow to Sadr and led to a hasty settlement with Grand Ayatollah Sistani the following morning which allowed Al-Sadr and the remnants of his militia to leave Najaf. This arrangement was favorable to the Americans because it relieved them of the need to enter the Imam Ali Mosque. Marines from 1st Blt, 4th Marines lined the street watching Sadr's Mahdi Army leave the mosque.

== Aftermath ==
The battle ended on 27 August 2004 with a negotiated ceasefire: Mahdi army fighters left the Imam Ali shrine among the Pilgrim crowd and none of them were detained; The Iraqi police took control of the security in the city. Sporadic fighting continued for some months. Some Mahdi Army fighters from Najaf went to Sadr City in Baghdad, where there had also been heavy fighting, to help the Mahdi Army in their guerrilla activities against U.S. and Iraqi forces.

A final agreement between the U.S. and Muqtada al-Sadr was reached by the end of September. Fighting ceased in early October. Fighting spread to Najaf province and lasted for several more months before finally winding down.
