= State Protection Service =

Polish government security service

State Protection Service Służba Ochrony Państwa
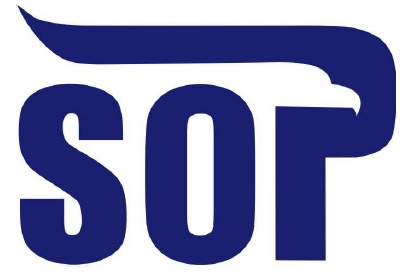
- Abbreviation: SOP

Agency overview
- Formed: 2018
- Preceding agency: Government Protection Bureau

Jurisdictional structure
- Operations jurisdiction: Poland and abroad on official state visits of VIPs

Website
- https://www.sop.gov.pl/pl/

The State Protection Service (Polish: Służba Ochrony Państwa [ˈswuʐ.ba ɔˈxrɔ.nɘ ˈpaɲ.stfa]) is a Polish uniformed service which provides VIP security for the Polish government. It was formed on 1 February 2018 as a successor to the Government Protection Bureau.

== History ==
On 8 December 2017, the Parliament passed the Law on the State Protection Service, the Senate approved it without amendments on 21 December, and on 11 January 2018, the President signed it.

== Subjects of protection ==
- President of the Republic of Poland and his family
- Prime Minister of the Republic of Poland and his family
- First Lady of Poland
- Marshal of the Sejm
- Marshal of the Senate
- Deputy Prime Ministers
- Minister of Foreign Affairs
- Minister of Interior and Administration
- Minister of National Defence
- Former Presidents
- Former Prime Ministers
- Other individuals by decree of the Minister of Interior
- Foreign heads of state, governments, representatives, and diplomats while on Polish soil

== Gallery ==
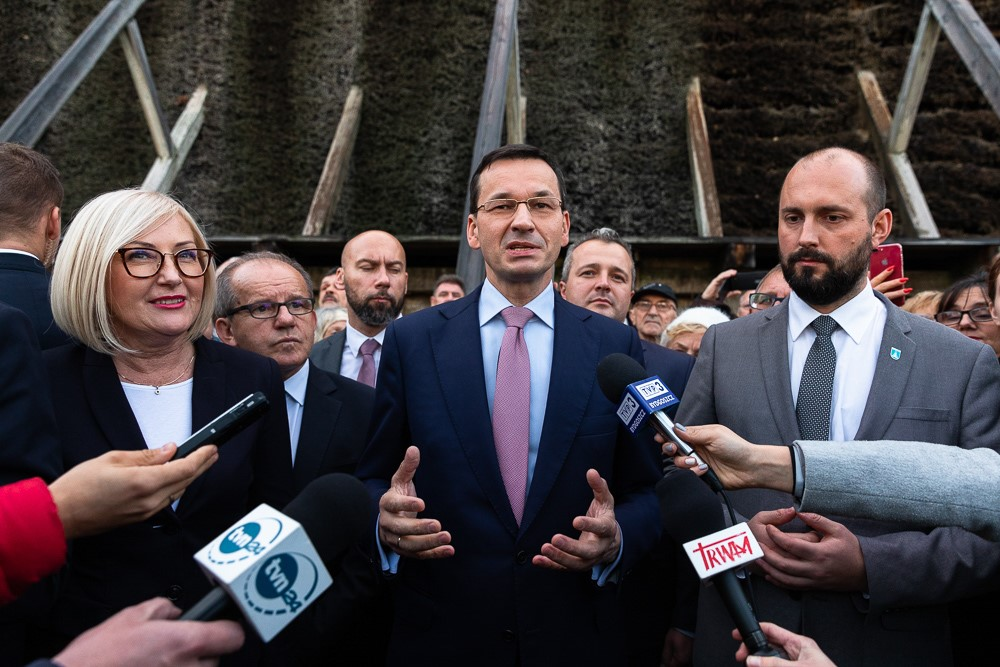
Prime Minister Mateusz Morawiecki surrounded in the back by SOP officers

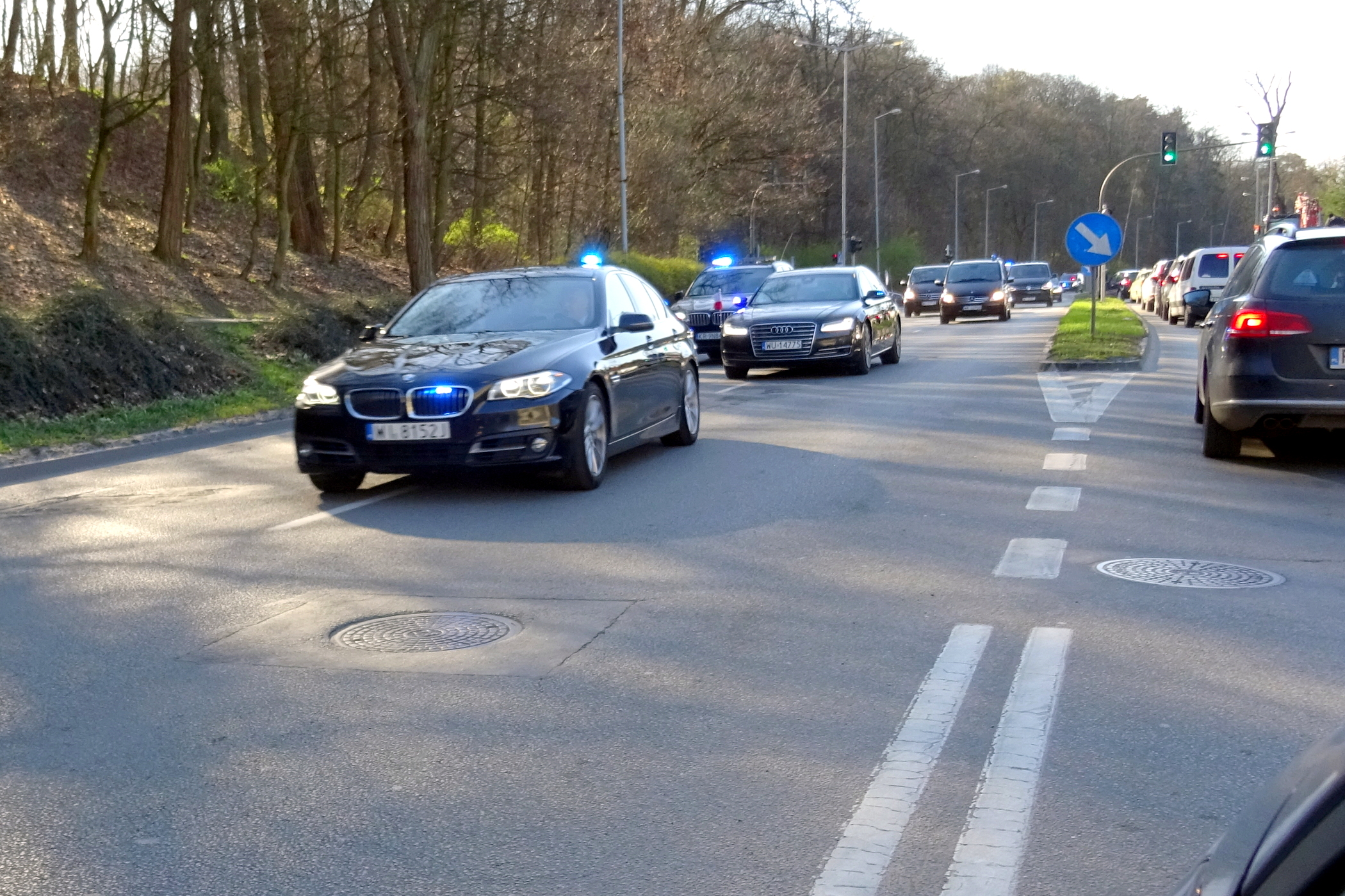
SOP motorcade

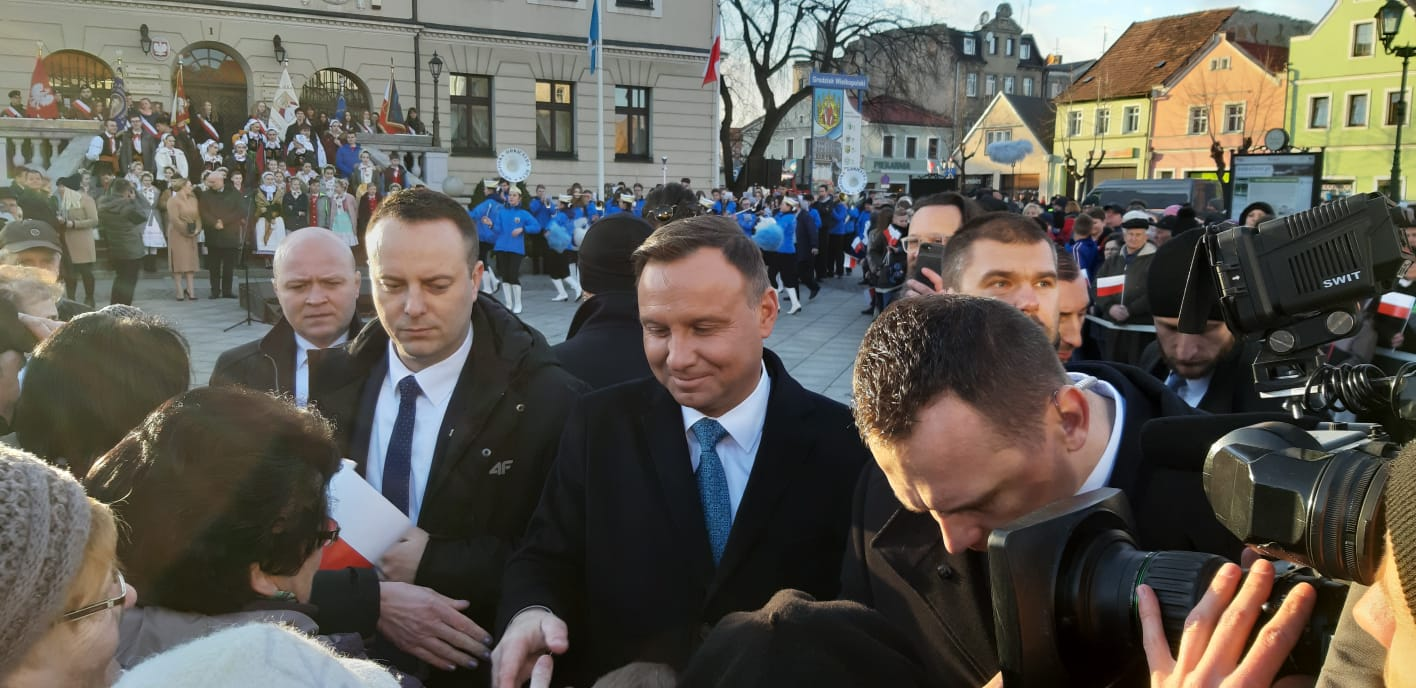
President Andrzej Duda surrounded by SOP officers.
