= Order of Merit of the Republic of Poland =

Order of Merit of the Republic of Poland; Order Zasługi Rzeczypospolitej Polskiej
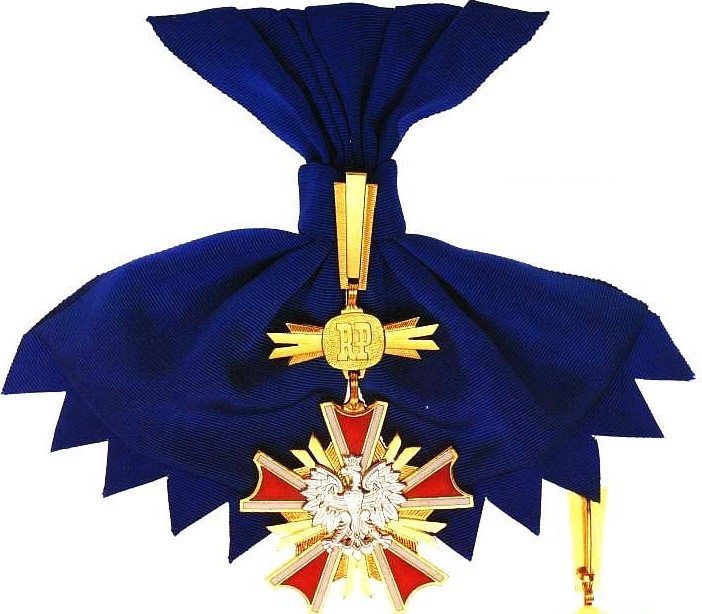
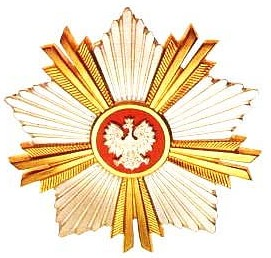
- The Grand Cross of Order of Merit of the Republic of Poland
- Type: Five grade order
- Awarded for: Service in improving relations between nations
- Country: Poland
- Presented by: the President of Poland
- Status: Currently awarded
- Established: 10 April 1974 (Revised 16 October 1992)
- Order of Merit of the Republic of Poland ribbon

Precedence
- Next (higher): Order of the Cross of Independence
- Next (lower): Cross of Valour

The Order of Merit of the Republic of Poland (Polish: Order Zasługi Rzeczypospolitej Polskiej) is a Polish order of merit created in 1974, awarded to persons who have rendered great service to Poland. It is granted to foreigners or Poles resident abroad. As such, it is sometimes referred to as a traditional "diplomatic order".

== History ==
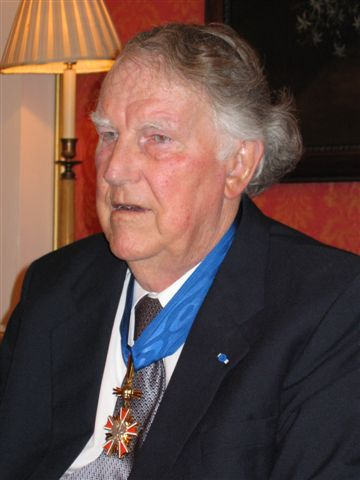
Sir Edmund Hillary wearing the Commander's Cross in 2004

The order was established by an act of 10 April 1974, as the Order of Merit of the Polish People's Republic (Order Zasługi Polskiej Rzeczypospolitej Ludowej). The need for the new order had arisen since the Order of the White Eagle had fallen into disuse after the foundation of the People's Republic. Reflecting this history, the two orders utilized similar colors and designs. The Order of Merit of the Polish People's Republic was awarded in five classes: Grand Cordon of the Order, Commandery with Star, Commandery, Gold Badge of the Order, and Silver Badge of the Order. It was awarded by the Polish Council of State.

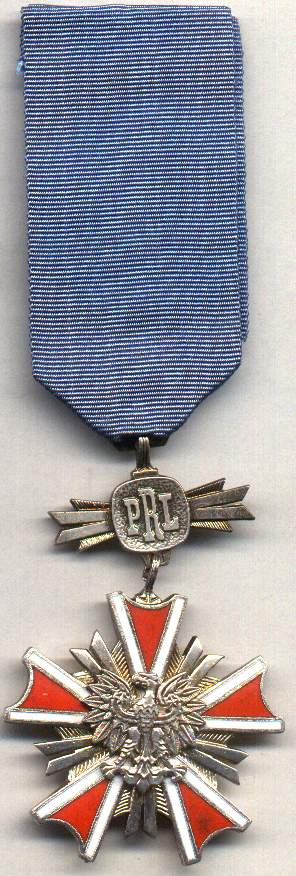
The People's Republic of Poland version of the order (5th class)

After the fall of communism in Poland in 1989, it was decided to retain the order, with necessary changes. Without a formal change of the 1974 act or the name of the order, the insignia were changed to the present ones by a presidential decree of 16 April 1991. The abbreviation "PRL" was changed to "RP," the Eagle was given a crown in accordance with Poland's original coat of arms, the date "1974" was removed from the reverse, and the color of the ribbon was changed from light cobalt blue to dark cobalt.

Under an act of 16 October 1992, the order was reestablished under the name Order of Merit of the Republic of Poland (Order Zasługi Rzeczypospolitej Polskiej).

Under the 1992 act, the order is awarded to foreigners or Poles resident abroad for distinguished contributions to international cooperation or cooperation between Poland and other countries. It is awarded by the President of Poland. Unlike the other national orders of Poland, it does not have a chapter.

Recipients of the Grand Cross of the Order of Merit of the Republic of Poland, the highest award of the class, have included Queen Elizabeth II, Henry Kissinger, and Edward Mosberg.

== Degrees ==
From 1974 to 1991 the Order was awarded in the following classes:

- 1st class – Grand Cordon of the Order of Merit of the People's Republic of Poland
- 2nd class – Commandery with Star of the Order of Merit of the People's Republic of Poland
- 3rd class – Commandery of the Order of Merit of the People's Republic of Poland
- 4th class – Gold Badge of the Order of Merit of the People's Republic of Poland
- 5th class – Silver Badge of the Order of Merit of the People's Republic of Poland

Since 1992 the Order is awarded in the following classes: (Note: In 1991–1992 period the names of the classes were: 1st class – Grand Cordon of the Order of Merit of the Republic of Poland; 2nd class – Commandery with Star of the Order of Merit of the Republic of Poland; 3rd class – Commandery of the Order of Merit of the Republic of Poland; 4th class – Gold Badge of the Order of Merit of the Republic of Poland; 5th class – Silver Badge of the Order of Merit of the Republic of Poland)

- 1st class – Grand Cross of the Order of Merit of the Republic of Poland
- 2nd class – Commander's Cross with Star of the Order of Merit of the Republic of Poland
- 3rd class – Commander's Cross of the Order of Merit of the Republic of Poland
- 4th class – Officer's Cross of the Order of Merit of the Republic of Poland
- 5th class – Knight's Cross of the Order of Merit of the Republic of Poland

== See also ==
- Orders, decorations, and medals of Poland
