= Medal for Long Marital Life =

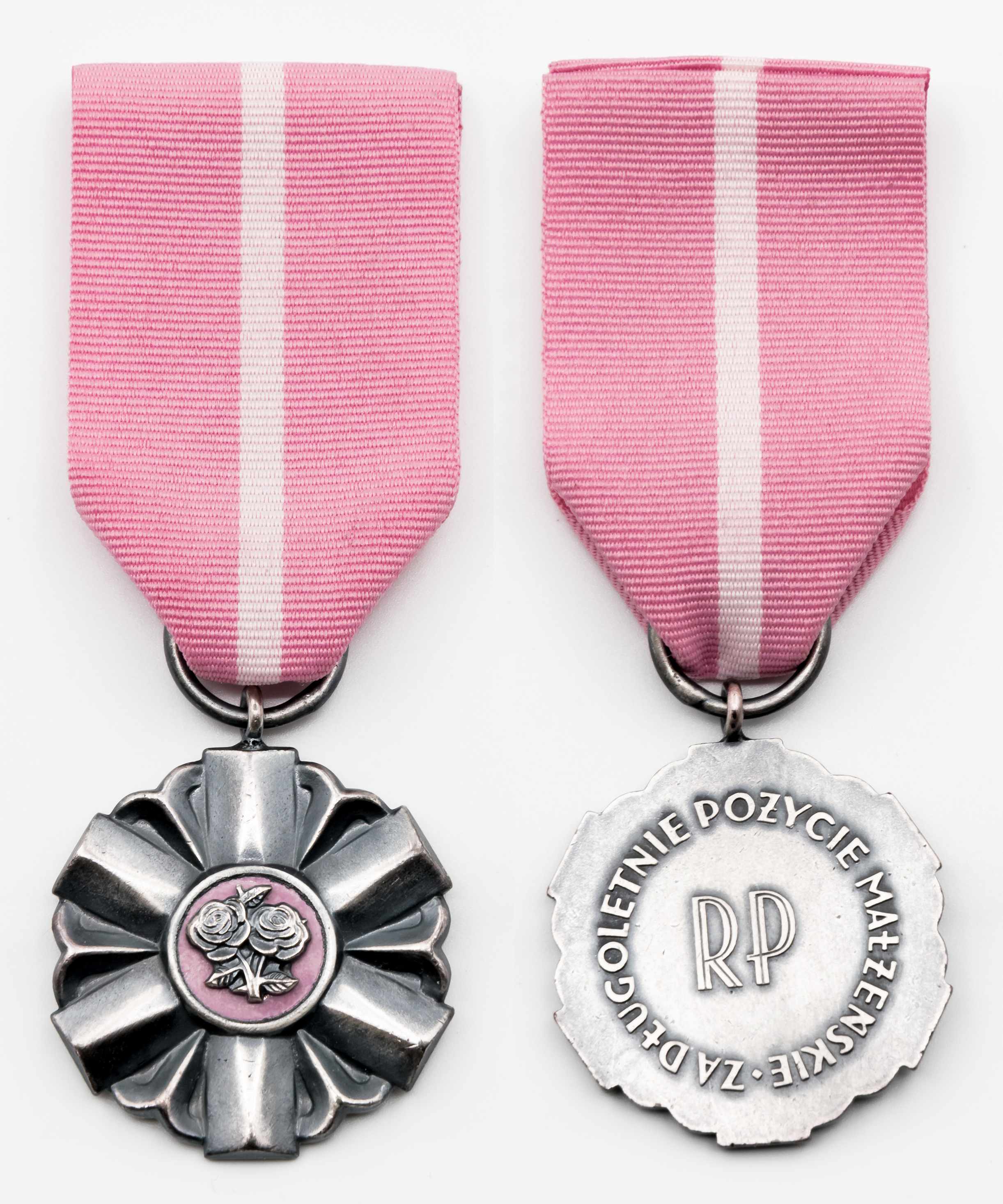
- 2023 version of the medal
- Type: single grade medal
- Awarded for: 50 years of marriage
- Country: Poland
- Presented by: the President of Poland
- Status: currently awarded
- Established: 17 February 1960
- The medal's ribbon

Precedence
- Next (higher): Medal for Long Service
- Next (lower): Stars

The Medal for Long Marital Life (Polish: Medal Za Długoletnie Pożycie Małżeńskie) is a Polish medal established on 17 February 1960. It is awarded to couples who have been married for at least 50 years. It is a round, silver medal with six rays. The obverse has a pink enameled center with two roses with intertwined stems superimposed. The reverse has the letters RP in the center. Surrounding this are the words: ZA DŁUGOLETNIE POŻYCIE MAŁŻEŃSKIE in a circle. The medal is 35mm in diameter. The ribbon is 37mm wide with a 4mm wide white stripe in the center of the ribbon.
