= Medal for Long Service =

Medal for Long Service Medal za Długoletnią Służbę
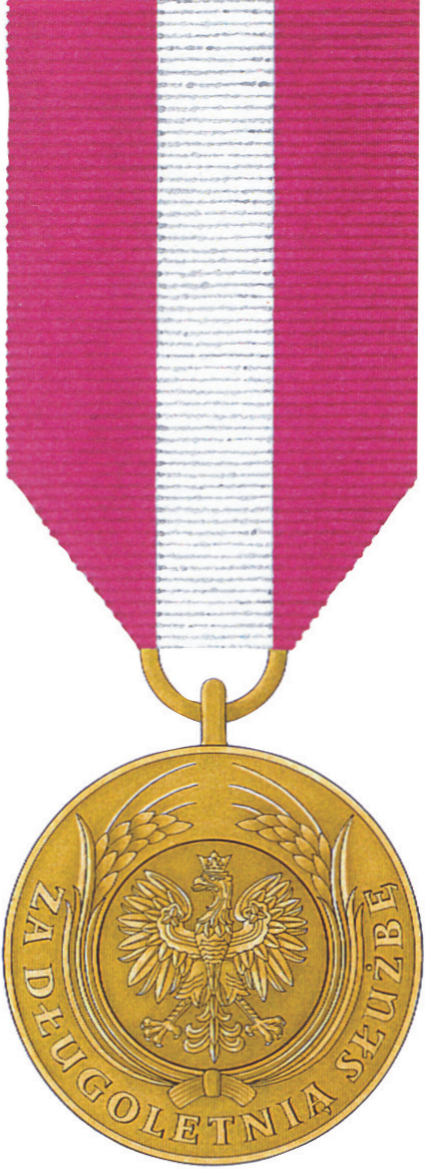
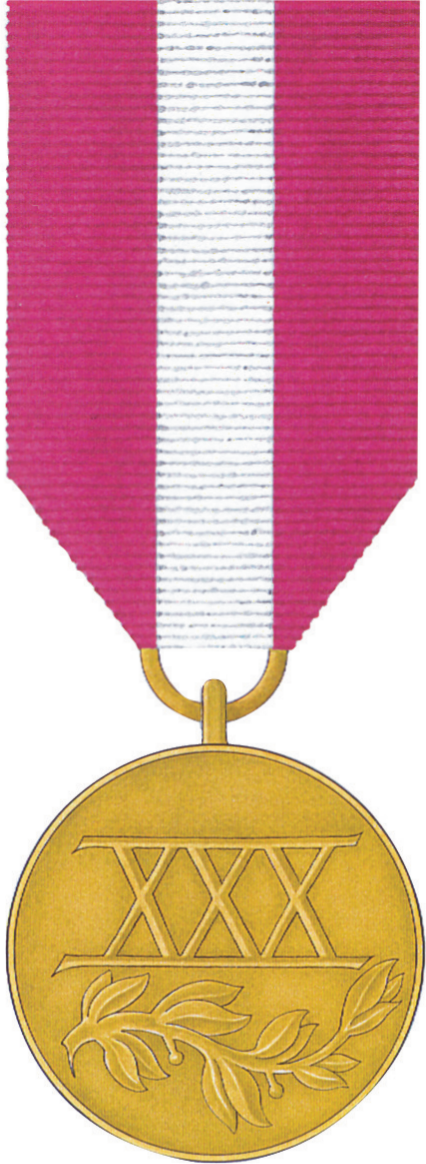
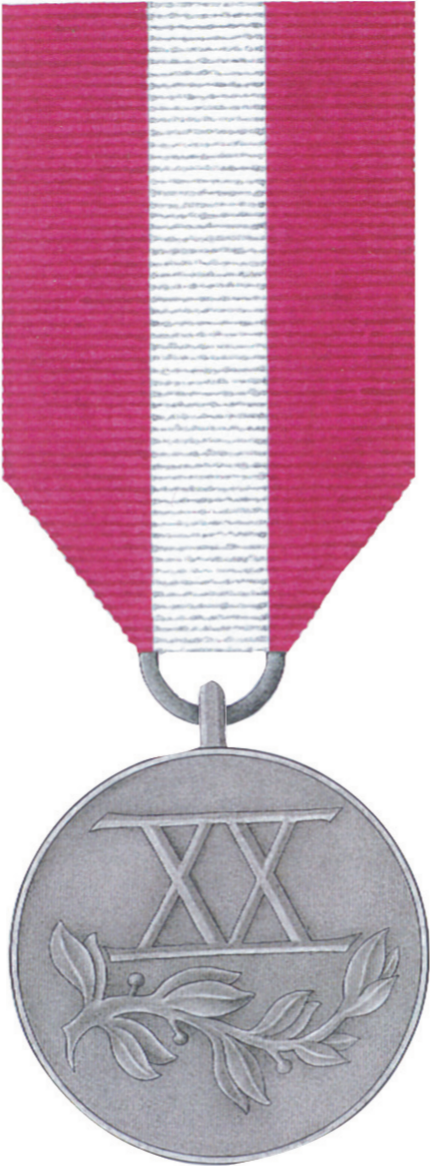
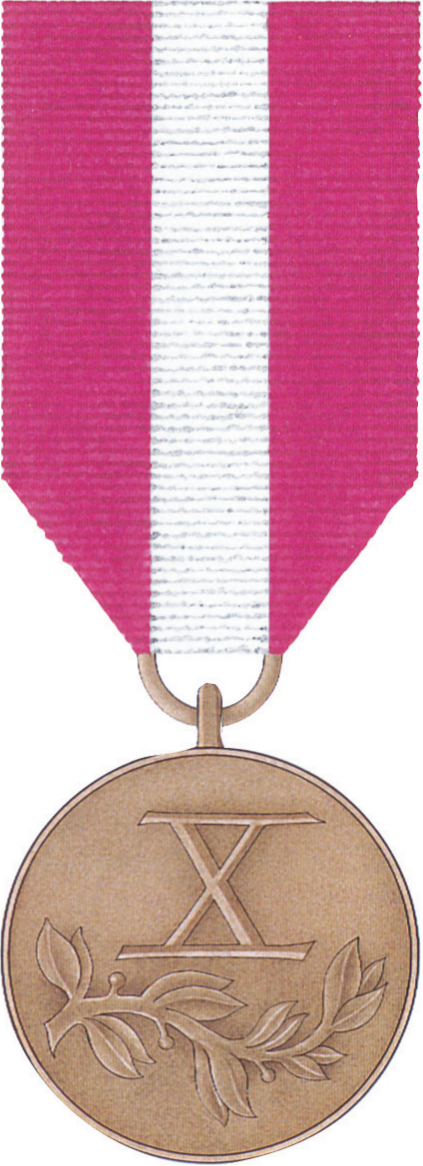
- Obverse and reverse for 30 years Reverse for 20 and 10 years
- Awarded for: 30, 20 and 10 years of honorable military or civilian service
- Country: Poland
- Presented by: the President of Poland
- Eligibility: Military and civilian
- Status: Currently awarded
- Established: 8 January 1938; 14 June 2007 (renewal)
- Ribbon bars for 30, 20 and 10 years of service

Precedence
- Next (higher): Medal for Sacrifice and Courage
- Next (lower): Medal for Long Marital Life
- Related: Medal of the Armed Forces in the Service of the Fatherland

The Medal for Long Service (Polish: Medal za Długoletnią Służbę) is a Polish decoration awarded in three classes (gold, silver and bronze) to members of the Polish Armed Forces and other uniformed services, and to civil servants who have honorably completed 30, 20 or 10 years of service to the State.

== History ==
The medal was established by the Law of January 8, 1938. After the outbreak of the Second World War the conferment was suspended, and after the war the medal was eventually discontinued. In 1951, it was replaced by the Medal of the Armed Forces in the Service of the Fatherland for members of the armed forces.

The Medal for Long Service was revived by the Law of 14 June 2007, which amended the Act of 16 October 1992, concerning medals and decorations, along with the Military Cross and the Military, Air Force and Navy Cross of Merit. The change came into force on October 9, 2007. In the hierarchy of Polish medals, it ranks between the Medal for Sacrifice and Courage and the Medal for Long Marital Life.

== Eligibility ==
The original medal of 1938 was awarded by the appointed minister to any member of the armed forces or other uniformed services, or to civilian employees of the government or local government following 30 (gold medal), 20 (silver medal) or 10 years (bronze medal) of continuous or cumulative service. As only service after November 18, 1918, counted, only the silver and bronze medals were awarded; the first gold medals would only be awarded in 1948. The recipients of the medal were required to make monetary payment for it.

Since 2007 the medal has been conferred by the President of Poland. It has replaced the Cross of Merit as a state-conferred award for long and honorable service. Unlike its pre-World War II counterpart, the conferment is not automatic, but is decided on an individual basis.

== Design ==
The medal is circular, 35 mm in diameter, and is made from gilded, silver-plated or bronze-patined metal. (The original medals were silver or bronze.) The obverse depicts a Polish crowned eagle surrounded by rye ears and circumscribed "ZA DŁUGOLETNIĄ SŁUŻBĘ" ("FOR LONG SERVICE"). On the reverse are the Roman numerals "XXX", "XX" or "X", with a laurel spray below. The same numeral in gold, silver or bronze is attached to the ribbon bar.
