= Cross of Valour (Poland) =

Cross of Valour Krzyż Walecznych
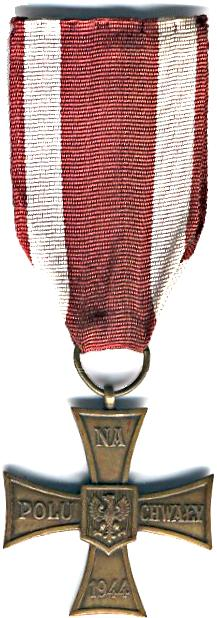
- The People's Republic of Poland version of the medal and ribbon.
- Type: Single-grade medal.
- Awarded for: Deeds of valour and courage on the field of battle.
- Description: Obverse bears the words, "NA POLU CHWAŁY" ("ON THE FIELD OF GLORY"), while the reverse bears the word, "WALECZNYM" ("TO THE VALIANT"), and the date "1920" or "1944," depending on date of institution.
- Country: Poland
- Presented by: the President of Poland
- Clasps: denotes subsequent awards
- Status: In the award system but a wartime decoration only
- Established: 11 August 1920.
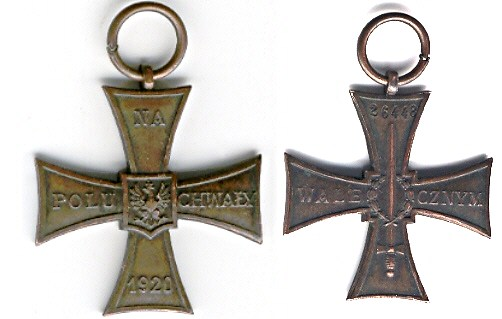
- Polish-Soviet War period medal

Precedence
- Next (higher): Order of Merit of the Republic of Poland.
- Next (lower): Military Cross.

The Cross of Valour (Polish: Krzyż Walecznych) is a Polish military decoration. It was introduced by the Council of National Defense on 11 August 1920. It is awarded to an individual who "has demonstrated deeds of valour and courage on the field of battle." It may be awarded to the same person up to four times. The medal is given only in wartime or shortly after.

== History ==
=== Polish-Soviet War ===
The medal was introduced in 1920 at the height of the Polish-Soviet War, shortly before the climactic Battle of Warsaw. Initially it had no Order Council and was awarded personally by the Commander-in-Chief of the Polish Army. Later the option was added of delegating the medal's granting to front and division commanders.

Through 29 May 1923, when the last medal for the Polish-Soviet War was awarded, the Cross of Valour had been granted to some 60,000 soldiers.

Apart from individuals who had participated in the Polish-Soviet War, the medal had also been awarded retroactively to some soldiers of the Polish Legions, of World War I military units, of the Silesian Uprisings, of the Great Poland Uprising, and to members of the Polish Military Organization. It had been awarded, as well, to veterans of the January 1863 Uprising and to the city of Płock.

=== World War II ===
In January 1940 the Polish Commander-in-Chief, Władysław Sikorski, issued an order reintroducing the Cross of Valour. On 20 September, the President of Poland agreed to award the medal to eligible individuals who had already been awarded it four times during the Polish-Soviet War.

=== Polish People's Republic ===
In 1943, after the Battle of Lenino, General Zygmunt Berling, commander of the Soviet-backed Polish 1st Corps, awarded the Cross of Valour to several soldiers. The medal itself was approved as a military decoration by order of the communist-led State National Council on 22 December 1944. Up to 1949, some 30,000 of the medals were awarded to Polish soldiers fighting alongside the Red Army.

The cross with the date 1943 was awarded 960 times, the Soviet-made cross with the date 1944 was awarded about 10,000 times, and the post-war Polish-made Caritas crosses (2 types) were awarded about 20,000 times before 1949.

Ribbon bars of the Cross of Valour
	original design	used in the Polish Armed Forces in the West since 20 September 1941
1st award		
2nd award		
3rd award		
4th award		
