= Medal for Sacrifice and Courage =

Polish award

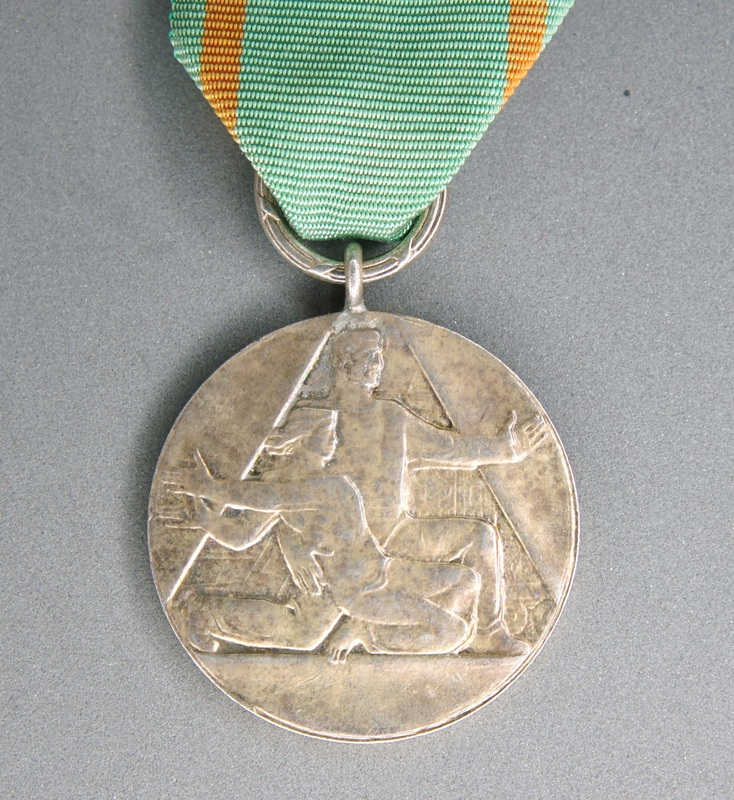
- Type: Single grade medal
- Awarded for: Selfless aid to the drowning, victims of natural disasters, fires, explosions, or other unfortunate circumstances
- Country: Poland
- Presented by: the President of Poland
- Status: Currently awarded
- Established: February 17, 1960
- ribbon bar

Precedence
- Next (higher): Military Cross of Merit, Air Force Cross of Merit, Navy Cross of Merit
- Next (lower): Medal for Long Service

The Medal for Sacrifice and Courage (Polish: Medal za Ofiarność i Odwagę) is a Polish medal established on February 17, 1960. It is awarded to those who, with disregard for their own life, save people from drowning, aid the victims of natural disasters, fires, explosions, or other unfortunate circumstances, or protect the property of others during such events. The medal was designed in 1960 by Józef Gosławski.
