= Military Cross (Poland) =

Polish military decoration

Military Cross Krzyż Wojskowy
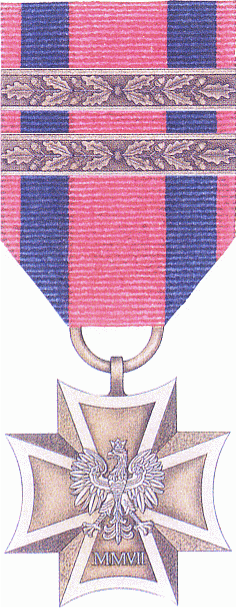
- Obverse of the medal with devices to indicate three awards
- Awarded for: To members of the Polish Armed Forces or civilians for combat valour against an act of terror in Poland or while on an overseas mission.
- Country: Poland
- Presented by: the President of Poland
- Eligibility: military or civilian
- Clasps: denotes subsequent awards
- Status: Currently awarded
- Established: 14 June 2007
- First award: 11 November 2007
- Ribbon bar of the medal

Precedence
- Next (higher): Cross of Valour
- Next (lower): Cross of Merit for Bravery
- Related: Order of the Military Cross; Military Cross of Merit

The Military Cross (Polish: Krzyż Wojskowy) is a military decoration awarded to soldiers of the Polish Armed Forces, as well as civilians for meritorious actions against terrorism, or in peacekeeping and stabilization missions. It is the non-warlike equivalent of the Cross of Valour.

== History ==
The Military Cross was established by the Law of 14 June 2007, which amended the Act of 16 October 1992, concerning medals and decorations. This law saw the creation of the Military Cross along with the Military Cross of Merit, Navy Cross of Merit, Air Force Cross of Merit and the Medal for Long Service. The change was implemented on 9 October 2007. According to the previously mentioned law, "The Military Cross has the distinction of being the reward for acts of bravery and courage made during operations against acts of terrorism in the country, or during use of the Polish Armed Forces outside the country in time of peace." In the order of precedence of Polish medals it ranks behind the Cross of Valor and the Cross of Merit for Bravery.

== Eligibility ==
The Military Cross is an award presented by the President of Poland, on his own initiative or at the request of the Minister of Defence or the Minister of Internal Affairs. The president also has the right to revoke the award. The cross is to be awarded no later than three years after the end of combat operations, and may be awarded to any single person up to four times. The Military Cross may be awarded to soldiers, policemen, officers of the Internal Security Agency, Intelligence Agency, Military Intelligence Service, the Military Counterintelligence Service, the Central Anticorruption Bureau, the Border Guard, the Government Protection Bureau, and the State Fire Service.

Military Cross Ribbon Bars
1st award	2nd award	3rd award	4th award

== See also ==
- Order of the Military Cross
