= Polish campaign stars =

Polish Campaign Stars
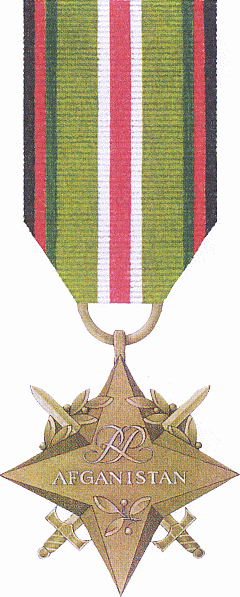
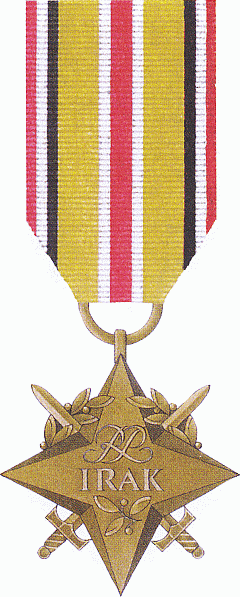
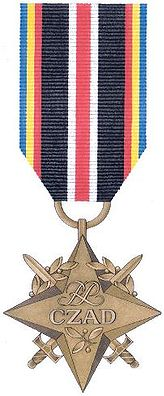
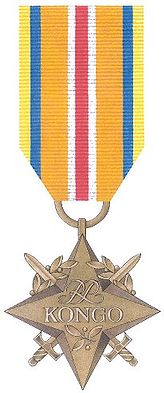
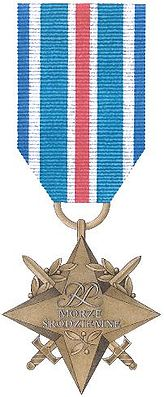
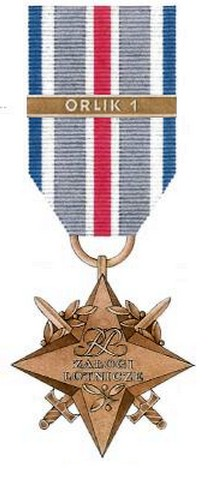
- Campaign stars for Afghanistan, Iraq, Chad, Congo, Mediterranean Sea and Air Crew (with clasp).
- Type: Campaign medal
- Awarded for: Overseas service with Polish forces
- Country: Poland
- Presented by: the President of Poland
- Eligibility: Polish military and civilian personnel, as well as foreigners serving in support of Polish Forces
- Status: Currently awarded
- Established: 14 June 2007 (as general)

Precedence
- Next (higher): Medal for Long Marital Life
- Next (lower): Other crosses and awards in the order they were received.

Polish campaign stars were established on 14 June 2007 to recognize military and civilian participants of overseas missions since 2002. Polish personnel must have been present for at least one day. Foreigners may be presented with a campaign star for collaborating with Polish forces during the mission.

== Appearance ==
The medal is 44 mm across in a bronze patina in the shape of a four pointed star. Behind the star are two crossed swords, blades pointing upward. The raised monogram of the letters "RP" is found in the top arm of the star. In the middle of the star is the name of a country or a geographical area for operations. On the lower arm and between the upper arms are stylized laurel leaves. The reverse contains the two-line inscription "PACI SERVIO" (Service to peace) in the center of the star, with a place below for engraving dates of service.

The award is suspended on the ribbon in the color defined for each individual star, in a width of 35 mm, with a red stripe width of 4 mm through the center, which has white stripes on the sides of a width of 2 mm and symmetrically arranged along the edges of connected strips or stripes in the colors of the flag state or area.

Clasps may be awarded for a specific military operation or for repeated deployments. Clasps are horizontal bars 38 mm wide and 5 mm tall. They are in a dull, brown patina, with polished edges, a polished Arabic numeral, or the name of a specific military operation. Ribbon bars are identical to the ribbon suspending the star.

Polish Campaign Stars:

Ribbon	Campaign	Established	Notes
	Afghanistan Star	31 July 2007
	Iraq Star	31 July 2007
	Chad Star	12 February 2010
	Congo Star	12 February 2010
	Mediterranean Sea Star	12 February 2010
	Air Crew Star	4 May 2012

== See also ==
- Orders, decorations and medals of Poland
