= Cross of Merit with Swords (Poland) =

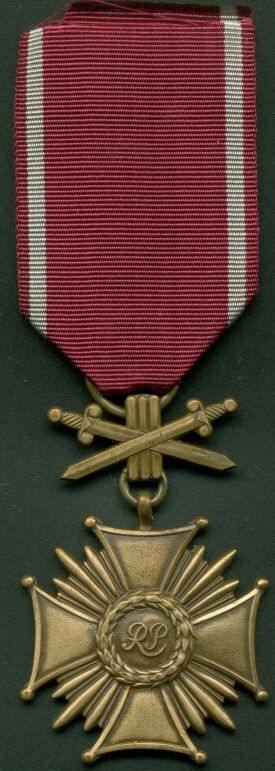
- Bronze grade of current Cross of Merit with Swords.
- Type: Medal awarded in three grades: Gold, Silver, Bronze.
- Awarded for: Deeds of bravery and valor not connected with direct combat, and for merit demonstrated in perilous circumstances.
- Country: Poland
- Presented by: the President of Poland
- Status: In the award system but a wartime decoration only
- Established: October 19, 1942

Precedence
- Next (higher): Cross of Merit for Bravery
- Next (lower): Cross of Merit

The Cross of Merit with Swords (Polish: Krzyż Zasługi z Mieczami) is a Polish military award established on 19 October 1942 by the Polish Government in Exile during World War II.

== Criteria ==
The Cross of Merit with Swords is awarded for deeds of bravery and valor during time of war not connected with direct combat, and for merit demonstrated in perilous circumstances. The cross may be awarded twice in each grade to the same person (since 1992; earlier it has could be awarded four times).

== Grades ==
The Order has three grades:

1. Gold Cross of Merit with Swords
2. Silver Cross of Merit with Swords
3. Bronze Cross of Merit with Swords

Ribbon bars of the Cross of Merit with Swords
		Gold Cross	Silver Cross	Bronze Cross
model 1942	awarded first time			
model 1942	awarded twice			
model 1942	awarded three times			
model 1942	awarded four times			
model 1992	awarded first time			
model 1992	awarded twice			

== Recipients ==
- Stansilaw Lukaszewicz (Bronze Cross of Merit with Swords), Sargeant 10 Dragoons, 1 Polish Armoured Division, 1 Polish Corps for action at Falaise Gap, France 1944.
- Bolesław Piwowarczyk (Bronze Cross of Merit with Swords), Sergeant 5th Kresowa Division, 2nd Polish Corps.
- Paul Jacot (Silver Cross of Merit with Swords), Civilian For the courage and bravery shown within the Polish organisation (resistance) during the battle for independence on French territory in 1943 and 1944**..
- Maria Irena Mileska (Silver Cross of Merit with Swords)
- Mieczyslaw Lezanowski (Silver Cross of Merit with Swords), during service in the Middle East then 2nd Lieutenant with the Polish 2nd Corps at the battle of Monte Cassino
- Jan Zaleski (Gliwice) (Gold Cross of Merit with Swords), Jan Zaleski, son of Marcin, in the ranks of Bataliny Chlopski was awarded in 1944 with the Gold Merit with Swords.
- Charles Gossage Grey (Gold Cross of Merit with Swords), "For service rendered the development of the Polish Military Intelligence during World War II. Réseau F-2.from Jan 4 1941 to Dec 31 1942
