= Council of National Defense (Poland) =

The Council of National Defense (Polish: Rada Obrony Państwa) was an extraordinary temporary governmental body created by a decree of the Sejm of the Second Polish Republic, of 1 July 1920.

Poland was then facing defeat by Bolshevik Red Armies that were approaching Warsaw. The Council was a body that was intended to make decisions more expeditiously than the Sejm. It was fully authorized to take decisions regarding the conduct and conclusion of the war.

The Council comprised:

- Naczelnik Państwa (Chief of State) Józef Piłsudski, the Council's chair;
- Prime Minister Wincenty Witos, deputy chair;
- The Marshal of the Sejm;
- Ten Sejm deputies, representing the main political parties;
- Three ministers selected by the Council of Ministers;
- Three representatives of the military, selected by the Chief of State. They varied, depending on the specific military matters under consideration.

The Chief of State was empowered to call Council meetings, chair them and set the agenda.

The Council enjoyed very broad powers, in order to be able to exercise far-reaching autonomy and reduce bureaucratic obstacles. Its decisions were to be implemented at once.
