= Military Cross of Merit =

Military Cross of Merit (Wojskowy Krzyż Zasługi) Navy Cross of Merit (Morski Krzyż Zasługi) Air Force Cross of Merit (Lotniczy Krzyż Zasługi)
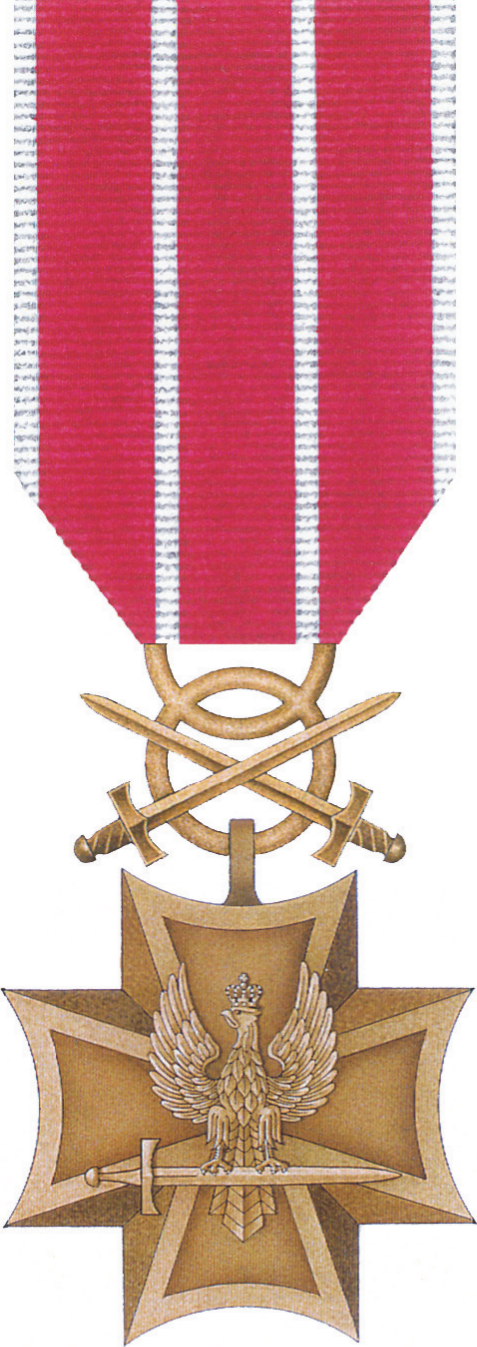
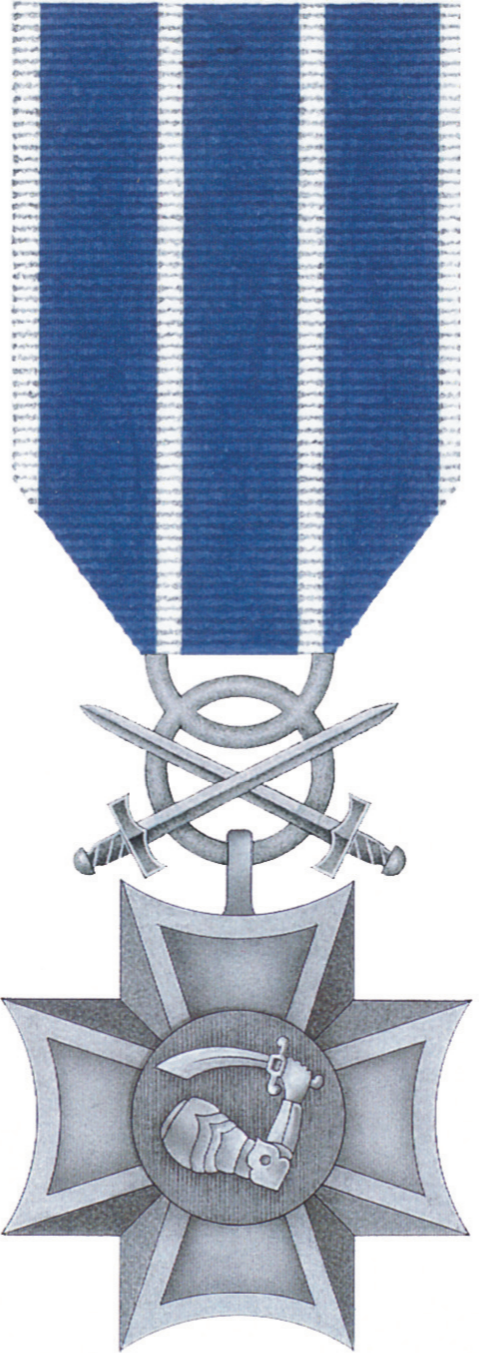
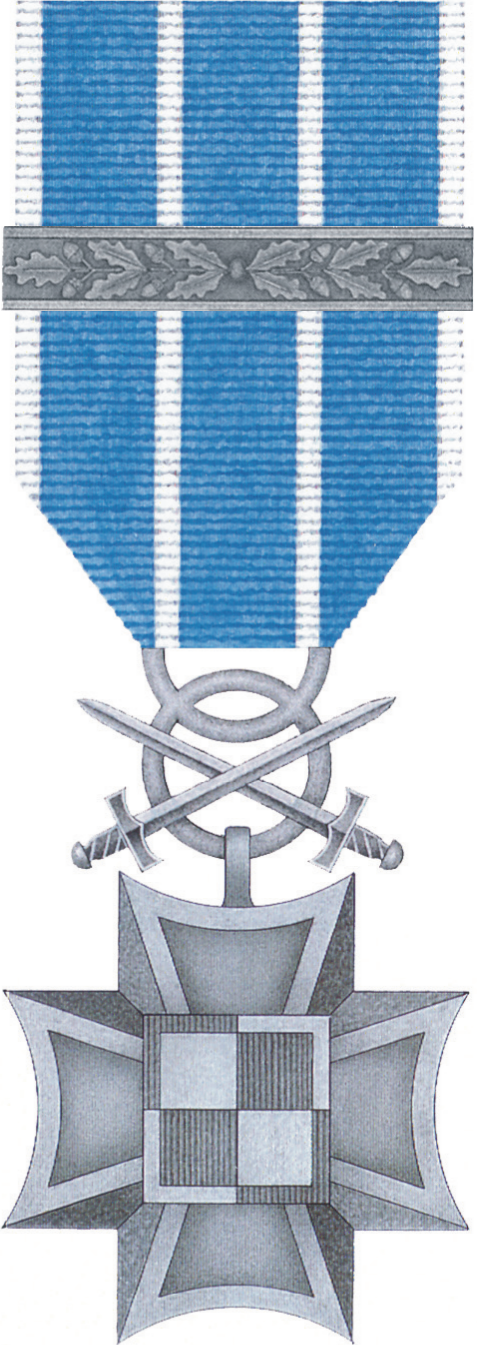
- Obverse of the crosses with swords (z Mieczami)
- Awarded for: To members of the Polish Armed Forces for meritorious service in combat operations against acts of terrorism at home or during military missions overseas (w. swords); for outstanding non-combat meritorious achievement or service (without swords).
- Country: Poland
- Presented by: the President of Poland
- Eligibility: Military
- Clasps: denotes subsequent award
- Status: Currently awarded
- Established: 14 June 2007
- Ribbon bar of the Army Cross of Merit w. Swords Ribbon bar of the Navy Cross of Merit w. Swords Ribbon bar of the Air Force Cross of Merit

Precedence
- Next (higher): Bronze Cross of Merit
- Next (lower): Medal for Sacrifice and Courage
- Related: Order of the Military Cross; Military Cross

The Military Cross of Merit (Polish: Wojskowy Krzyż Zasługi), Navy Cross of Merit (Morski Krzyż Zasługi), Air Force Cross of Merit (Lotniczy Krzyż Zasługi) are military decorations awarded to members of the Polish Armed Forces. The crosses with swords (z Mieczami) are conferred for meritorious service in combat operations against acts of terrorism at home or during military, peacekeeping or stabilization missions overseas; the crosses without swords are conferred for outstanding non-combat meritorious achievement or service.

== History ==
The crosses were established by the Law of 14 June 2007, which amended the Act of 16 October 1992, concerning medals and decorations. This law saw the creation of the crosses along with the Military Cross and the Medal for Long Service. The change was implemented on October 9, 2007. In the order of precedence of Polish medals it ranks between the Bronze Cross of Merit and the Medal for Sacrifice and Courage.

== Eligibility ==
The crosses are presented by the President of Poland, on his own initiative or at the request of the Minister of Defence. The president also has the right to revoke the award. The crosses with swords are to be awarded no later than three years after the end of combat operations. Each of the crosses may be awarded twice to any single person, the second award being denoted by a bar on the ribbon and ribbon bar. A particular cross may be awarded to members of the service it represents, however in exceptional cases it can be conferred to members of the other services as well. Civilians and members of non-military uniformed services are not eligible.

== Design ==
The design of the crosses is patterned on that of the Order of the Military Cross. It is a massive Greek cross, in bronze for the Military Cross of Merit, in silver for the two other crosses. The center of the crosses is as follows:

- Military Cross of Merit: an eagle sitting on a sword;
- Navy Cross of Merit: an armed hand (the symbol of the Polish Navy);
- Air Force Cross of Merit: the Polish Air Force checkerboard.

The reverse looks the same for all three crosses and is inscribed "POLSKA SWEMU OBROŃCY" (Poland to her defender) with two laurel twigs on the sides.

Ribbon bars
	1st award	2nd award
Military Cross of Merit		
Military Cross of Merit with Swords		
Navy Cross of Merit		
Navy Cross of Merit with Swords		
Air Force Cross of Merit		
Air Force Cross of Merit with Swords		

== See also ==
- Order of the Military Cross
- Military Cross
