= Volunteer Cross for War =

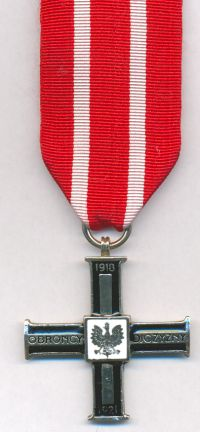
- Country: Poland
- Ribbon

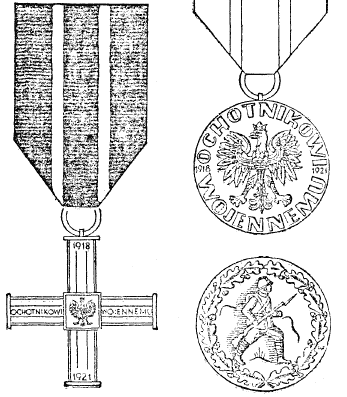
The Volunteer Cross and Medal

The Volunteer Cross for War and the Volunteer Medal for War (Krzyż i Medal Ochotniczy za Wojnę) were Polish military decorations introduced just before the start of World War II and later awarded by the Polish government in exile. The Cross and the Volunteer Medal for War were introduced by an act of the Sejm on 15 June 1939. It was to be awarded to people who volunteered for duty in the years 1918 to 1921 and helped to strengthen the independence of the Polish Republic. (Covering mainly the Polish-Ukrainian War and Polish-Soviet war). Because of the German invasion of Poland in 1939 and the outbreak of World War II no decorations were awarded at the time. It was only after 1945 that the Polish government in exile was able to award the decorations. The communists authorities of the People's Republic of Poland refused to recognize the decoration. After the fall of communism a very similar decoration, Krzyż za udział w Wojnie 1918-1921, was introduced.

== Criteria ==
The Volunteer Cross for the War was bestowed upon volunteers who served during the years 1918-1921, provided they fulfilled any of the following conditions:

- Fallen or wounded on the battlefield,
- Decorated with either the Virtuti Militari Cross or the Cross of Valor,
- Actively served for a duration of 3 months, inclusive of a minimum of 2 months within units engaged in frontline combat, or 6 months as instructors within military schools of arms and training camps.

== Design ==
The medal takes the form of a straight isosceles cross crafted from steel, measuring 42 by 42 mm. It comprises four identical arms, each extended at the ends and possessing a flattened octagonal cross-section. These arms converge at the center, fastened by a cube.

On the obverse side of the cross arms, a horizontal inscription reads: "OCHOTNIKOWI WOJENNEMU," while the vertical arms bear the dates "1918" and "1921." At the intersection of the arms lies an image of a white enamel eagle.

The cross and accompanying medal are intended to be worn on a 37 mm wide ribbon, characterized by a red hue with two slender white vertical stripes.
