= Government Protection Bureau =

Government Protection Bureau Biuro Ochrony Rządu

Agency overview
- Formed: 1956
- Dissolved: 2018
- Superseding agency: State Protection Service

Jurisdictional structure
- Operations jurisdiction: Poland
- Constituting instrument: The Government Protection Bureau Act
- Specialist jurisdiction: Protection of international or domestic VIPs, protection of significant state assets

Operational structure
- Agency executive: Col. Andrzej Pawlikowski
- Parent agency: Ministry of Internal Affairs and Administration

Website
- (in Polish) Official website

The Government Protection Bureau or Bureau of Government Protection (Polish: Biuro Ochrony Rządu, BOR, Polish pronunciation: [ˈbjurɔ ɔˈxrɔnɨ ˈʐɔndu]) was Poland's equivalent of the United States Secret Service, providing antiterrorism and VIP security services for the Polish government. On February 1, 2018, the bureau was disbanded and replaced by the State Protection Service (Polish: Służba Ochrony Państwa, SOP), absorbing its manpower and functions (security of incumbent and former Presidents of Poland, high ranking state officials, institutions and Polish embassies and consulates abroad).

== Subjects of protection ==
- President of the Republic of Poland
- Prime Minister of the Republic of Poland
- Marshal of the Sejm
- Marshal of the Senate
- Deputy Prime Ministers
- Minister of Foreign Affairs
- Minister of Interior and Administration
- Former Presidents (for life while on Polish soil)
- Former Prime Ministers (for a six-month period after leaving office)
- Other individuals by decree of the Minister of Interior
- Foreign heads of state, governments, representatives and diplomats while on Polish soil

== Gallery ==
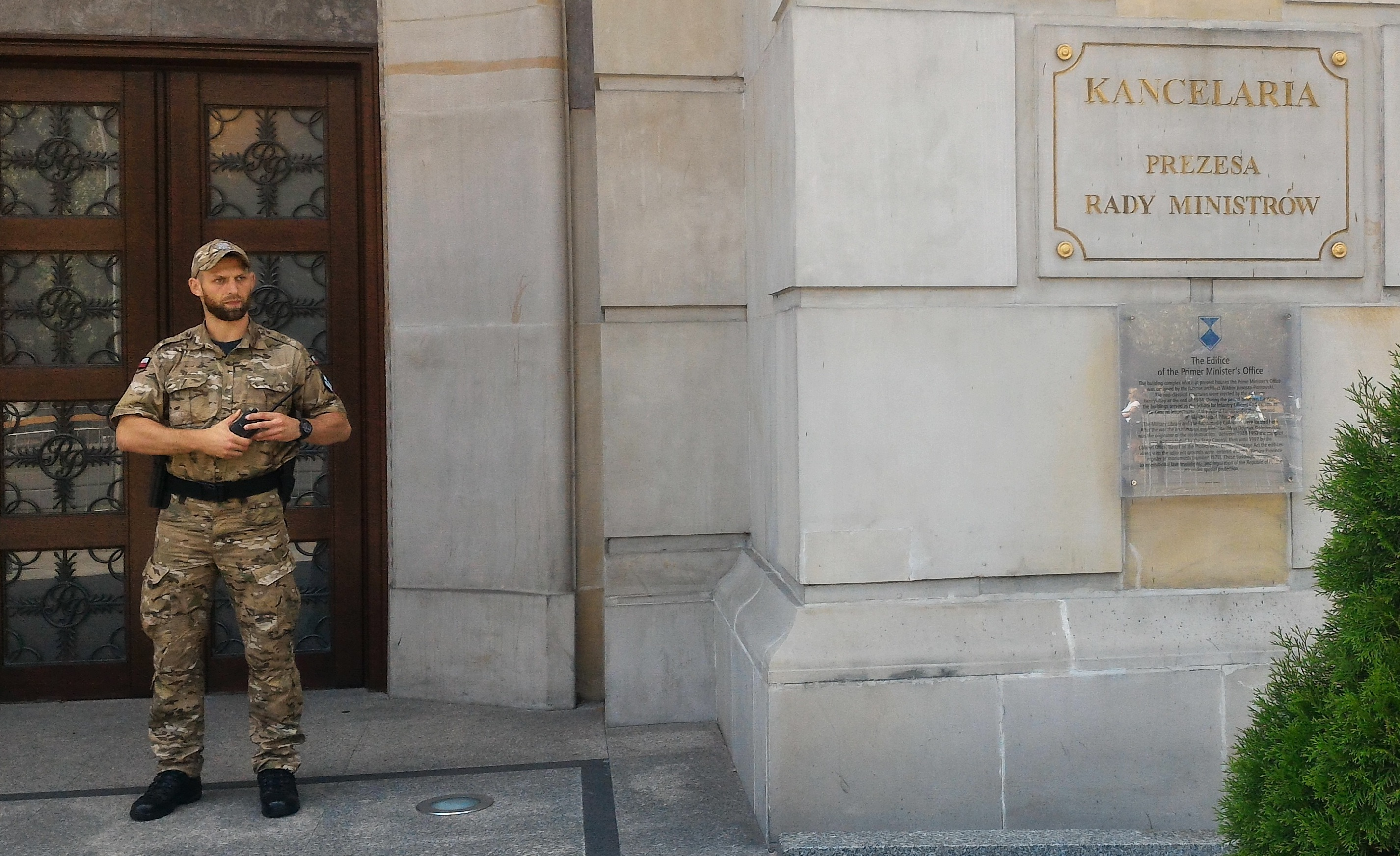
Government Protection Bureau officer guarding the area of the Chancellery of the Prime Minister of Poland

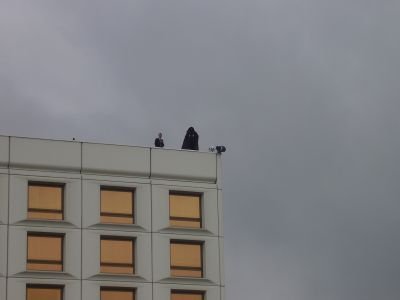
Government Protection Bureau snipers guarding the area of Piłsudski Square during President's speech.

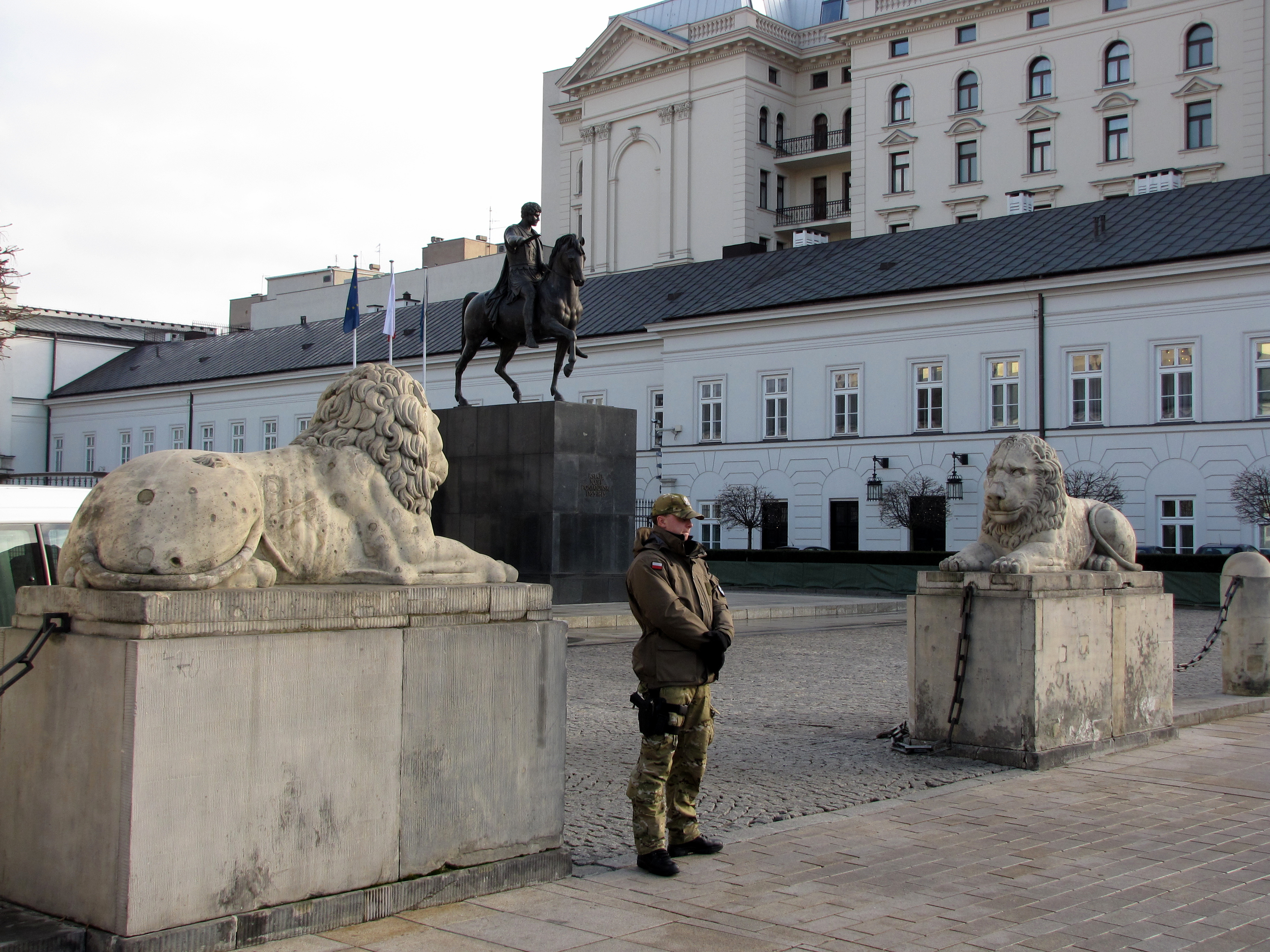
Government Protection Bureau officer guarding Presidential Palace, Warsaw

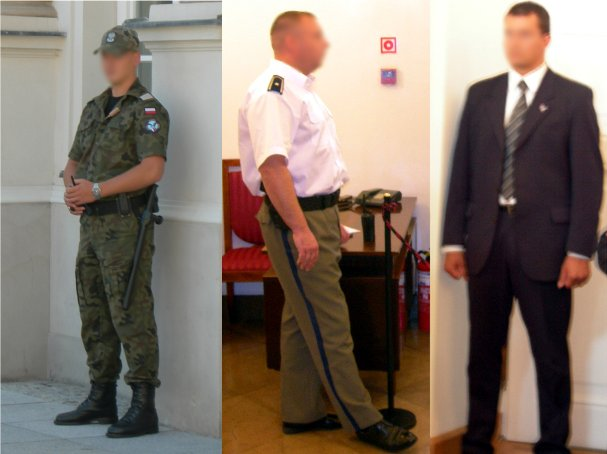
Government Protection Bureau officers in different uniforms
