= Order of the Military Cross =

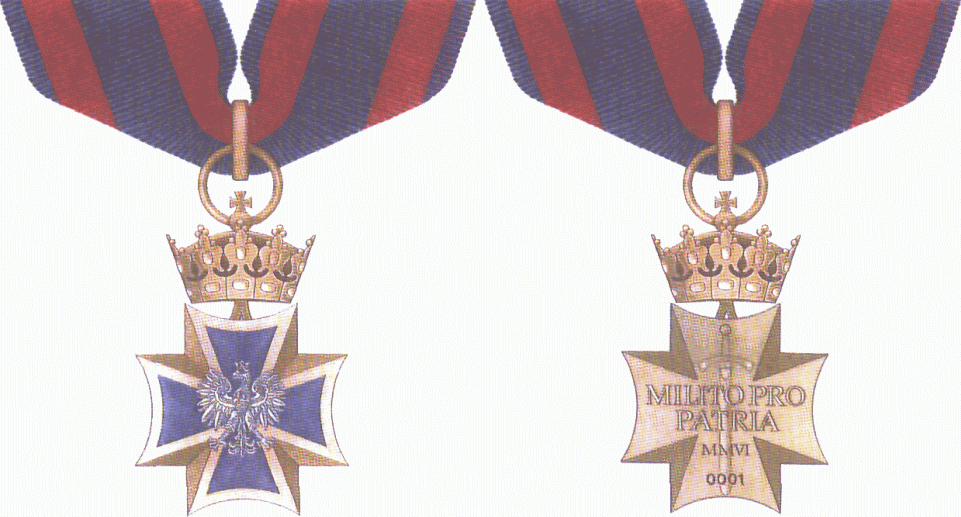
- Grand Cross (obverse & reverse)
- Type: Three classes
- Awarded for: Distinguished service in the field of counter-terrorism or military action during times of peace
- Country: Poland
- Presented by: the President of Poland
- Eligibility: Military and civilian
- Status: Currently awarded
- Established: October 18, 2006

Precedence
- Next (higher): Order of Polonia Restituta
- Next (lower): Order of the Cross of Independence
- Related: Military Cross; Military Cross of Merit; Wound Decoration

The Order of the Military Cross (Polish: Order Krzyża Wojskowego) is a Polish order established on October 18, 2006. It is awarded for "distinguished service, sacrifice, and courage in actions against terrorism in the country or during foreign deployments of the Armed Forces of the Republic of Poland in times of peace." It can be conferred to soldiers, civilians and entire military units.

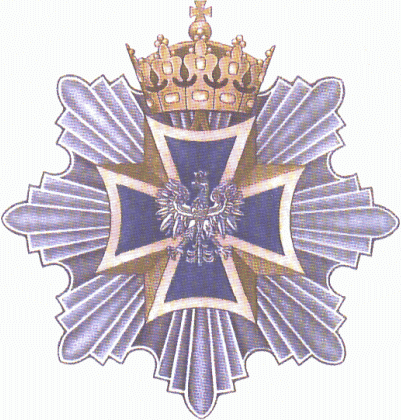
The star of the Order of the Military Cross

== Classes ==
The Order has three classes:

1. Grand Cross (Krzyż Wielki)
2. Commander's Cross (Krzyż Komandorski)
3. Knight's Cross (Krzyż Kawalerski)

== Notable recipients ==
- gen. broni Bronisław Kwiatkowski
- gen. dyw. Tadeusz Buk

== See also ==
- Military Cross (Poland)
