= Cross of Merit for Bravery (Poland) =

Award of Poland

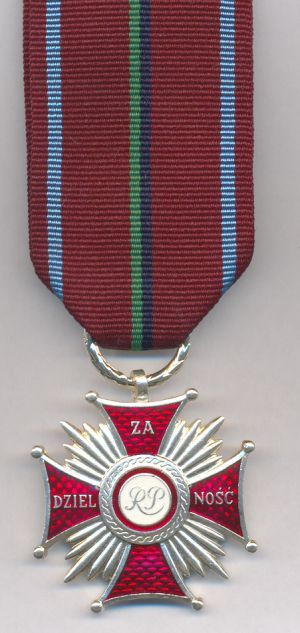
- The current version of the Cross of Merit for Bravery
- Type: Single grade medal
- Awarded for: Selfless bravery in the defense of law, national borders, and the life and property of citizens in especially difficult circumstances
- Country: Poland
- Presented by: the President of Poland
- Eligibility: Personnel in the military or certain civilian agencies
- Status: Currently awarded
- Established: 7 March 1928
- ribbon bars (left: first version) (right: current version)

Precedence
- Next (higher): Military Cross
- Next (lower): Cross of Merit with Swords

The Cross of Merit for Bravery (Polish: Krzyż Zasługi za Dzielność) is a Polish medal awarded for selfless bravery in the defense of law, national borders, and the life and property of citizens in especially difficult circumstances.

It was established on 7 March 1928 as a military grade of the Cross of Merit. The medal was awarded until World War II and was not recognized by the post-war government. On 16 October 1992 the medal was reintroduced and is currently awarded to police officers, firefighters, and several military and civilian agencies involved in intelligence or security.

The obverse bears the words "Za Dzielność" (Polish: For Bravery) and the letters RP for Republic of Poland.
