= Monte Cassino Commemorative Cross =

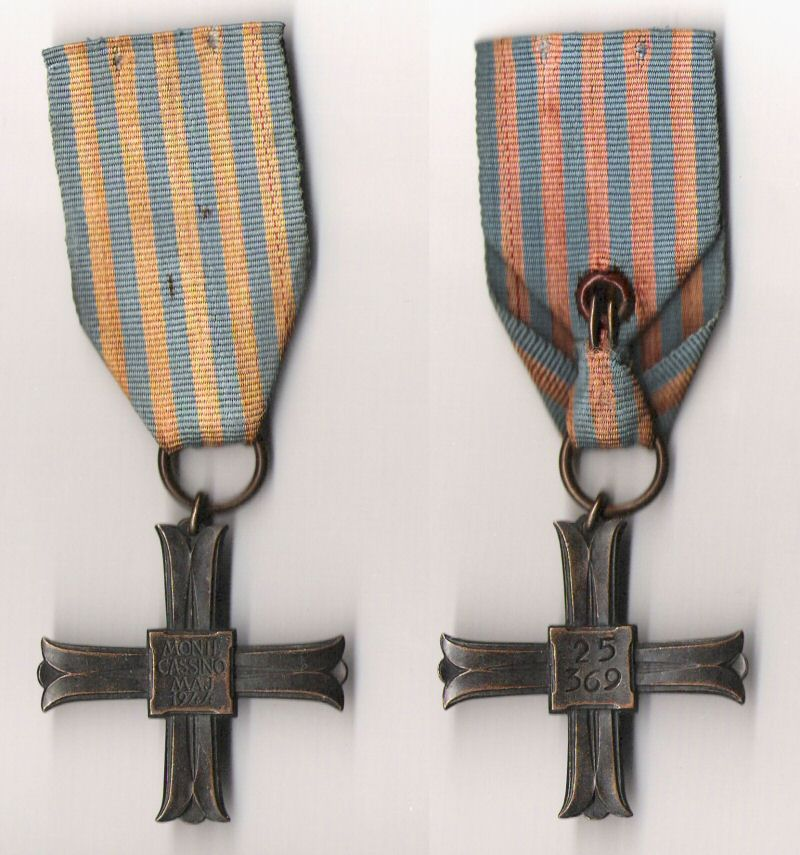
- Obverse (top left) with the inscription "MONTE CASSINO MAJ 1944" and reverse (top right) with the serial number of the medal. Cross 25369 was awarded to a soldier of the 5th Engineers Battalion, 5th Kresowa Infantry Division: Sapper Jan Giedo
- Type: Campaign medal
- Awarded for: Campaign service
- Presented by: Polish government in Exile
- Eligibility: Polish II Corps
- Campaign: Battle of Monte Cassino
- Clasps: None authorised.
- Established: 1944

The Monte Cassino Commemorative Cross (Polish: Krzyż Pamiątkowy Monte Cassino) is a commemorative medal awarded to all soldiers of the Polish II Corps who fought in the battle of Monte Cassino and the battles for Piedimonte and Passo Corno. After the capture of Monte Cassino in May 1944, the Polish government-in-exile (in London) created a campaign cross to commemorate the role of the Polish II Corps (often known as Anders Army) in capturing this strategic point, which had long blocked the Allied advance up the Italian peninsula.

A consignment of 50,000 crosses was ordered from a manufacturer in Tel Aviv, then part of British-ruled Palestine, where the Polish forces had spent part of 1942 and almost all of 1943 in training. A total of 48,498 crosses (serial numbers 1 to 48,498) were awarded with accompanying award documents issued in the field to each soldier who took part in the battle. Although it is commonly believed that no master record exists to indicate which serial numbers were given to specific soldiers, records do indicate which blocks of serial numbers were given to units within the Polish II Corps. Furthermore, the actual lists of named cross recipients are held at the Polish Institute and Sikorski Museum.

The 1502 un-awarded crosses (serial numbers 48,499 to 50,000) were eventually sold off to dealers and collectors. At the moment of its institution in June 1944, the medal was 19th in the Polish order of precedence.

== Recipients by Unit ==
The Monte Cassino Commemorative Cross was issued to the following units:
CROSS No. UNIT

1 Senior Commanders - General Władysław Anders, General Officer Commanding 2 Polish Corps
2 Senior Commanders - General Zygmunt Bohusz-Szyszko, Deputy General Officer Commanding 2 Polish Corps
3 Senior Commanders - Bishop Józef Gawlina, Polish Army Field Bishop
4 Senior Commanders - General Bolesław Bronisław Duch, General Officer Commanding 3 Carpathian Rifle Division
5 Senior Commanders - General Nikodem Sulik, General Officer Commanding 5 Kresowa Infantry Division
6 Senior Commanders - General Bronisław Rakowski, General Officer Commanding 2 Armoured Brigade
7 Senior Commanders - General Roman Odzierzyński General Officer Commanding 2 Polish Corps Artillery
8 Senior Commanders - General Prof. Dr Bolesław Szarecki, General Officer Commanding 2 Polish Corps Medical Services
9 Senior Commanders - Colonel Dr. Ludwik Ząbkowski, Commanding Officer 2 Artillery Group, 2 Polish Corps
10 Senior Commanders - Colonel Kazimierz Wiśniowski, 2 Polish Corps Chief of Staff
11 Senior Commanders - Colonel Stanisław Skowroński, 2 Polish Corps Quartermaster
12 Senior Commanders - Colonel Mieczysław Zaleski, Commanding Officer 2 Polish Corps Signals Units
13 Senior Commanders - Colonel Konstanty Skąpski, Commanding Officer 2 Polish Corps Engineering Units
14-749 Headquarters 2 Corps Staff
750 Headquarters 2 Corps Staff – Melchior Wańkowicz, War Correspondent
751-1102 Killed in Action 3 Carpathian Rifle Division
1103-2043 Officers 3 Carpathian Rifle Division
2044-14702 Other Ranks listed Alphabetically 3 Carpathian Rifle Division
14703-14750 Not Awarded
14751-15246 5 Kresowa Infantry Division Headquarters Staff
15247-15375 Headquarters Staff 5 Wilno Infantry Brigade
15376-16136 13 Wilno Rifle Battalion
16137-16878 14 Wilno Rifle Battalion
16879-17615 15 Wilno Rifle Battalion
17616-17743 Headquarters Staff 6 Lwow Infantry Brigade
17744-18477 16 Lwow Rifle Battalion
18478-19206 17 Lwow Rifle Battalion
19207-19938 18 Lwow Rifle Battalion
19939-20656 4 Light Artillery Regiment
20657-21362 5 Light Artillery Regiment
21363-22027 6 Light Artillery Regiment
22028-22654 5 Anti-Tank Regiment
22655-23554 5 Light Anti-Aircraft Regiment
23555-24438 15 Poznan Lancer Regiment
24439-25130 5 Heavy Machine Gun Battalion
25131-26019 5 Engineers Battalion 5KDP
26020-26526 5 Signals Battalion
26527-26770 5 Sanitary (Medical) Company
26771-27016 6 Sanitary (Medical) Company
27017-27059 Command Supply and Transport Units
27060-27324 5 Supply Company
27325-27583 6 Supply Company
27584-27966 15 Supply Company
27967-28307 16 Supply Company
28308-28443 5 Workshop Company [5 EME Coy.]
28444-28586 6 Workshop Company [6 EME Coy.]
28587-28691 5 Provost (Military Police) Squadron [Coy.]
28692-28733 6 Light Artillery Regiment
28734-28739 15 Poznan Lancer Regiment
28751-28975 Headquarters 2nd Warsaw Armoured Brigade
28976-28987 On secondment to 2nd Armoured Brigade
28988 Headquarters 2nd Warsaw Armoured Brigade
28989-29672 4 Skorpion Armoured Regiment
29673-30328 1 Krechowiecki Lancer Regiment
30329-30992 6th Children of Lwów Armoured Regiment
30993-31188 9 Signals Company
31189-31385 9 Light Sanitary (Medical) Company
31386-31909 9 Supply Company
31910-32105 9 Workshop Company [9 EME Coy.]
32106-32246 9 Forward Tank Replacement Squadron [Coy.]
32247-32269 6 Field Court, 2nd Armoured Brigade
32270-32300 Not Awarded
32301-32332 Command, 2nd Artillery Group
32333-32361 Staff, Counter-Battery Section
32362-33050 7 Horse Artillery Regiment
33051-33055 7 Horse Artillery Regiment - Wounded
33056-33057 7 Horse Artillery Regiment - Killed in Action
33058-33759 9 Medium Artillery Regiment
33760-33767 9 Medium Artillery Regiment - Killed in Action/Died of Wounds
33768-34364 10 Medium Artillery Regiment
33765-34367 10 Medium Artillery Regiment - Wounded
33768-34374 10 Medium Artillery Regiment – Killed in Action
34375-34936 11 Medium Artillery Regiment
34937-34940 11 Medium Artillery Regiment - Wounded 27/4 to 11/5/45
34941-34945 11 Medium Artillery Regiment - Killed in Action/Died of Wounds
34946-34949 11 Medium Artillery Regiment
34950-34951 Command, 2nd Artillery Group
34952-34960 Not Awarded
34961-34978 Command, 2 Corps Artillery
34979-35631 7 Anti-Tank Regiment
35632-35657 7 Anti-Tank Regiment - Killed
35658-36543 7 Light Anti-Aircraft Regiment
36544-37518 8 Heavy Anti-Aircraft Regiment
37519-38083 1 Artillery Survey Regiment
38084-38655 Carpathian Lancer Regiment
38656 Colonel Henryk Ignacy Szymanski (USA) US Army Liaison
38657-38760 Carpathian Lancer Regiment
38761-38776 Command, 2 Corps Engineers
38777-39697 10 Battalion, Corps Engineers [10 Polish Corps Troops Engineers]
39698-40043 10 Bridging Company
40044-40297 301 Engineering Company
40298-40370 304 Mechanical Equipment Platoon
40371-40398 10 Bomb Disposal Platoon
40399-40420 306 Engineering Park
40421-40438 Command, Army Signals 2 Corps
40439-41052 11 Signals Battalion
41053-41061 2 Corps Signals Traffic Control Team
41062-41111 Corps Artillery Fire Control Signals Platoon
41112-41167 Command, Corps Artillery Group Signals Platoon
41168-41234 11 Special Radiotelegraphic Platoon
41235-41245 12 Special information Platoon
41246-41280 386 Signals Platoon
41281-41320 389 Medium Radio Platoon
41321-41338 2 Corps Signals Park
41339-41371 Seconded from 7 Inf.Div for Telephone Network Security
41372-41440 Air Support Signals Section
41441-41446 Aerial Photographic Interpretation Section
41447-41449 Heads of 2 Corps Medical Services
41450-41615 3 Casualty Clearing Station [stationed at Venafro]
41616-41783 5 Casualty Clearing Station [stationed at Pozzilli]
41784-42159 161 Military Hospital [later 2 Military Hospital - stationed at Campobasso]
42160-42171 Aerial Photographic Interpretation Section
42172-42328 162 Military Hospital [also known as 6 Field Hospital - stationed at Venafro]
42329-42736 1 Military Hospital [later 5 Military Hospital - stationed at Casamassima]
42737-43169 3 Military Hospital [stationed at Palagiano]
43170-43415 31 Sanitary (Medical) Company
43416-43443 32 Field Hygiene Platoon
43444-43451 34 Anti-Malaria Section
43452-43460 45 Surgical Team
43461-43470 46 Surgical Team
43471-43480 47 Surgical Team
43481-43489 48 Surgical Team
43490-43493 49 Transfusion Team
43494-43497 50 Transfusion Team
43498-43514 341 Field Medical Dump
43515-43520 Field Bacteriological-Chemical Unit
43521-43541 Heads, Supply and Transport Services
43542-43589 Command, 2 Corps Supply & Transport Units
43590-43863 21 Transport Company
43864 Brigadier Sir E H C Frith (UK) C.O. 26 British Liaison Unit
43865-43970 21 Transport Company
43971-44403 22 Transport Company
44404-44768 23 Transport Company
44769-45159 24 Transport Company
45160-45369 29 Ambulance Company
45370-45419 30 Independent Workshop Platoon
45420-45459 326 Supply Dump
45460-45501 327 Supply Dump
45502-45539 328 Supply Dump
45540-45617 61 Anti-Aircraft Artillery Supply Unit
45618-45715 62 Anti-Aircraft Artillery Supply Unit
45716-45777 331 Mobile Field Bakery
45778-45843 332 Mobile Field Bakery
45844–45884 334 Propellant Fuel Dump
45885-45912 336 Office Materials Dump
45913-45923 Delegation of Head of Field Canteens
45924-45973 318 Field Canteen and Mobile Library Company
45974-45986 Command, 26 Field [Forward] Supply Centre
45987-45999 Command, 27 Field [Forward] Supply Centre
46000-46012 Command, 28 Field [Forward] Supply Centre
46013-46026 Heads, Corps Material Services
46027-46045 Heads of Non-divisional Material Service Units
46046-46207 Command, Corps Material Park
46208-46251 Material Parks Delivery Platoon
46252-46257 Field Officers shop
46258-46269 Field Ammunitions Laboratory
46270-46377 350 Material Company Supply Station
46378-46480 375 Field Laundry
46481-46496 377 Field Bath
46497-46515 378 Field Bath
46516-46527 Heads of Corps Electrical and Mechanical Engineering Service
46528-46693 13 Workshop Company [13 EME Coy.]
46694-46872 15 Workshop Company [15 EME Coy.]
46873-47123 35 Workshop Company [35 EME Coy.]
47124-47127 Corps Ordinance Workshop
47128-47294 36 Rescue Company
47295-47303 Heads of Geographical Services
47304-47455 12 Geographical Company
47456-47475 312 Field Map Store
47476-47484 Command 2 Corps Provost (Military Police)
47485-47648 11 Provost (Military Police) Squadron [Coy.]
47649-47659 1 Provost (Military Police) Platoon
47660-47676 2 Provost (Military Police) Platoon
47677-47756 Command, Army Service Corps Units
47757-47958 Guard Battalion
47959-47966 Heads, Justice Service
47967-47994 12 Field Court
47995-48006 Office of War Graves Registration
48007-48046 370 Evacuated Equipment Park
48047-48089 371 Evacuated Equipment Park
48090-48135 372 Evacuated Equipment Park
48136-48149 2 Corps Inspectorate for Control of Technical Equipment
48150-48151 Heads, Field Postal Service
48152-48171 2 Corps Field Postal Department
48172-48178 2 Corps Military Censors Office
48179-48216 2 Corps Meteorological Section
48217-48230 Command, 2 Corps Financial Service [Paycorps]
48231-48257 2 Corps Press and Culture Office
48258-48263 Press and Culture Office, non-divisional units
48264-48272 Command Station No.1
48273-48290 Smoke Screen Unit
48291-48293 Soldiers’ Welfare Section
48294-48355 Concert and Entertainment Section
48356-48385 Reserve Liaison and Translator Officers
48386-48399 111 Bridge Security Company
48400-48407 Health Service Inspectorate, Women's Auxiliary Service (Poland)
48408-48498 Independent Commando Company
48499-48505 Headquarters 2 Corps Staff
48506-48514 Cipher Office and Radio Station
48515-48517 7 Light Anti-Aircraft Regiment
48518 7 Anti-Tank Regiment
48519 301 Engineering Company
48520 389 Medium Radio Platoon
48521-48523 2 Provost (Military Police) Platoon
48524 Heads, Supply and Transport Services
48525-48526
48527-48529 24 Transport Company
48530-48531 29 Ambulance Company
48532-48535 318 Field Canteen and Mobile Library Company
48536 35 Workshop Company [35 EME Coy.]
48537 13 Workshop Company [13 EME Coy.]
48538-48540 5 Military Hospital (Previously 1 Military Hospital)
48541-48542 162 Military Hospital
48543 161 Military Hospital
48544-48547 111 Bridge Security Company
48548-48553 Headquarters 2 Corps Staff
48554-48580 Aerial Photographic Interpretation Section
48581 8 Heavy Anti-Aircraft Regiment
48582-48583 Smoke Screen Unit
48584-48585 3 Casualty Clearing Station
48586 31 Sanitary (Medical) Company
48587-48597 Guard Battalion
48598-48600 Headquarters 2 Corps Staff
48601-48687 5 Kresowa Infantry Division (Various) Added after 22.2.1945
48688-48691 Headquarters 2 Corps Staff
48692 2 Corps Signals Traffic Control Team
48693 Carpathian Lancer Regiment
48694-48696 Heads of 2 Corps Medical Services
48697-48710 Heads, Supply and Transport Services
48711-48715 Heads of Corps Electrical and Mechanical Engineering Service
48716-48720 Command, Army Service Corps Units
48721-48749
48750-48759 Headquarters 2 Corps Staff
48760 7 Anti-Tank Regiment
48761 1 Artillery Survey Regiment
48762-48796 Convalescent Home (2 Battalion)
48797 Heads, Supply and Transport Services
48798 Heads, Corps Material Service
48799-48821 Guard Battalion
48822-48823 2 Corps Press and Culture Office
48824-48830
48831 663 Artillery Observation Air Squadron
48832
48833 7 Anti-Tank Regiment
48834-48845
48846 Convalescent Home (2 Battalion)
48847 8 Heavy Anti-Aircraft Regiment

The units listed above are not the official British War Office designations, but rather a close translated version taken from the Polish.

This information was brought to you courtesy of Andrzej Sankowski, and The Polish Institute and General Sikorski Museum. It was compiled by Dr. Mark Ostrowski. Recent research has established that the initial figures cited above were miscalculated and in fact the last known cross given to a named recipient was 48847. The complete list of named recipients is at the Polish Institute and Sikorski Museum in File AXII/85/214, Folders 1-19.

== See also ==
- Battle of Monte Cassino
