= 2nd Polish Corps (Polish Armed Forces in the West) =

II Corps
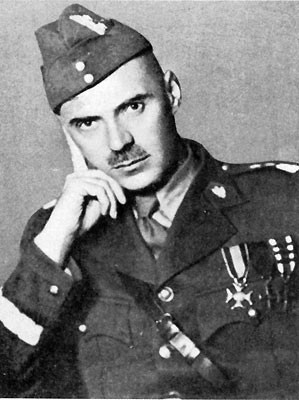
- General Władysław Anders, commander of the Polish II Corps in Italy.
- Active: 1943–1947
- Country: Poland
- Allegiance: Polish government-in-exile
- Branch: Polish Armed Forces in the West
- Size: 100,000
- Engagements: World War II

The 2nd Polish Corps (Polish: 2 Korpus Polski), 1943–1947, was a major tactical and operational unit of the Polish Armed Forces in the West during World War II. It was commanded by Lieutenant General Władysław Anders and fought with distinction in the Italian Campaign, in particular at the Battle of Monte Cassino. By the end of 1945, the corps had grown to well over 100,000 soldiers.

== History ==
Victims of Soviet deportations from occupied Poland in 1939–40 had been processed by the NKVD and sent to prison or exile in Siberia. The Nazi-Soviet pact of August 1939 effectively ended on 22 June 1941 when the German Wehrmacht invaded the USSR. The release of many thousands of former citizens of Poland (including Ukrainians and Belarusians) from the Soviet Gulags, following the signing of the Polish-Russian Military Agreement on 14 August 1941, allowed for the creation of a Polish Army on Soviet soil. Its first commander, General Michał Tokarzewski, began the task of forming this army in the Soviet village of Totskoye on 17 August. The commander ultimately chosen by Władysław Sikorski to lead the new army, Lieutenant General Władysław Anders, had just been released from the Lubyanka prison in Moscow, on 4 August, and did not issue his first orders or announce his appointment as commander until 22 August.

This army grew over the following two years and provided the bulk of the units and troops of the Polish II Corps.

The Polish II Corps was created in 1943 from various units fighting alongside the Allies in all theatres of war. The 3rd Carpathian Rifle Division was formed in the Middle East from smaller Polish units fighting in Egypt and Tobruk, as well as the Polish Army in the East that was evacuated from the Soviet Union through the Persian Corridor. Its creation was based on the British Allied Forces Act 1940, which allowed the Allied units of the exiled government of Poland to be grouped in one theatre of war. However, the British High Command never agreed to incorporate the exiled Polish Air Force into the Corps. In February 1944, the Polish II Corps was transferred from Egypt to Italy, where it became an independent part of the British Eighth Army, under Lieutenant-General Sir Oliver Leese.

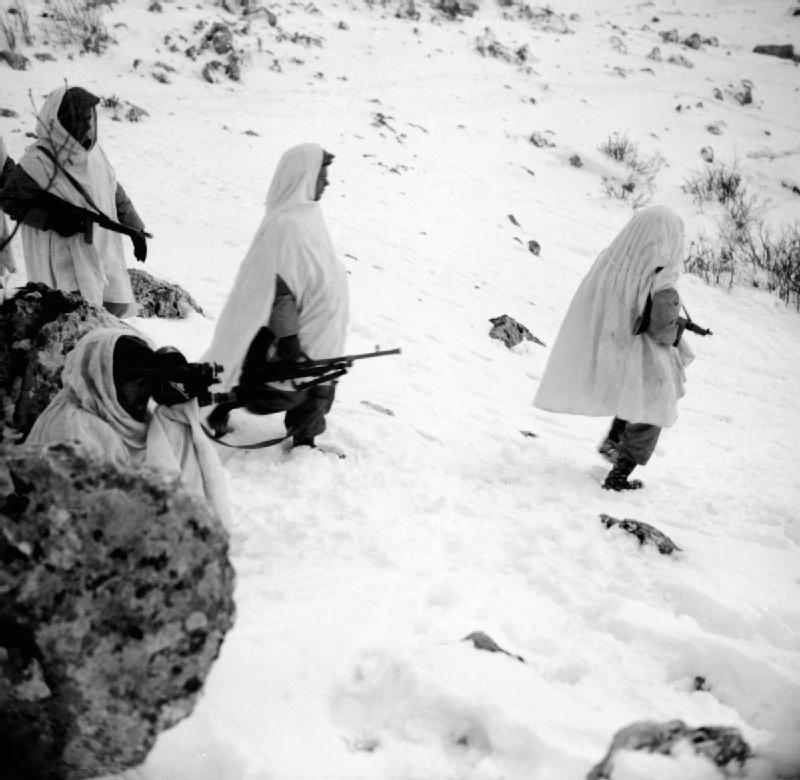
AFPU cameraman, Sergeant Eric Deeming, wearing snow camouflage, filming troops of the 2nd Coy., 1st Battalion, 1st Carpathian Rifles Brigade, 3rd Carpathian Rifles Division, returning from a patrol. Height 1210, north of Rionero in Vulture.

In May 1944, the Polish II Corps numbered about 50,000 soldiers and during 1944–45, it fought with distinction in the Italian campaign. During the fourth and final Battle of Monte Cassino, it suffered heavy losses (in the final stage of the Battle, even the support units were mobilised and used in combat) and it was suggested to General Anders that he withdraw his units. However, since the Soviet Union broke off diplomatic relations with the Polish government and no Poles were allowed out of the USSR, Anders believed that the only source of recruits lay ahead – in German POW camps and concentration camps. During the fighting in Italy in June 1944, the II corps was considered to be the most determined formation in the entire British 8th Army as the British historian H.P. Willmott wrote: "in the Allied camp the Poles were probably unequalled in their willingness and determination to get to close quarters with the enemy". On 12 June 1944, the Polish 3rd Carpathian Division had replaced the 4th Indian Division along the Penne-Atri-Pineto line. The II corps was assigned to lead the Allied advance along the Adriatic Sea and by 20 June 1944 the Poles had reached Fermo and were closing in on Ancona. After advancing 60 miles over a four day period, the II corps was halted by a German counterattack which drove the Poles back to the Chienti river. The Corps went on to fight at the Battle of Ancona during Operation Olive (the fighting on the Gothic Line in September 1944), and the Battle of Bologna during the final offensive in Italy in March 1945.

By 1945, new units were added, composed mainly of freed POWs and Poles forcibly conscripted into the Wehrmacht. This increased the Corps' strength to around 75,000 men, approximately 20,000 of whom were transferred to other Polish units fighting in the West. After the war, the divisions of the Corps were used in Italy until 1946, when they were transported to Britain and demobilised. The total establishment of the Polish II Corps in 1946 was 103,000.

The majority of soldiers remained in exile and settled in Britain, although some elected to settle in other countries such as Canada or Australia, either obtaining immigration visas there or relying on previous ties for repatriation.

The Corps had a consistently high fighting reputation and was well-regarded by the American and Commonwealth troops with whom they fought.

Those that settled in Britain were transported from many ports, including Toulon, France.

== Composition ==
In May 1945, the Corps consisted of 55,780 men, one bear and approximately 1,500 women in auxiliary services. Their bear mascot, named Wojtek, was officially entered onto the unit roll as a private soldier, subsequently being promoted to corporal. The majority of the Corps were Polish citizens who had been deported by the NKVD to the Soviet Gulags during the Soviet Union's annexation of Eastern Poland (Kresy Wschodnie) in 1939. Following Operation Barbarossa and the Sikorski-Mayski Agreement, many of them were released and allowed to join the Polish Armed Forces in the East being formed in Southern Russia and Kazakhstan. For political reasons, the Soviet Union soon withdrew support for the creation of a Polish Army on its territory and reduced the supply rate, which resulted in General Władysław Anders withdrawing his troops to British-held Persia and Iraq. From there, they were moved to British-controlled Palestine, where they joined forces with the 3rd Carpathian Division, which was composed mainly of Polish soldiers who had managed to escape to French Lebanon through Romania and Hungary after the defeat of Poland in 1939.

The main bulk of the soldiers were from the eastern voivodeships of pre-war Poland. Although the majority were ethnic Poles, there were also other nationalities, including Jews, Belarusians and Ukrainians. After being relocated to Palestine, many Jewish soldiers deserted and fled into the countryside. However, Menachem Begin – the future Prime Minister of Israel and at the time a II Corps soldier – though urged by his friends to desert, refused to remove his uniform until he had been officially discharged.

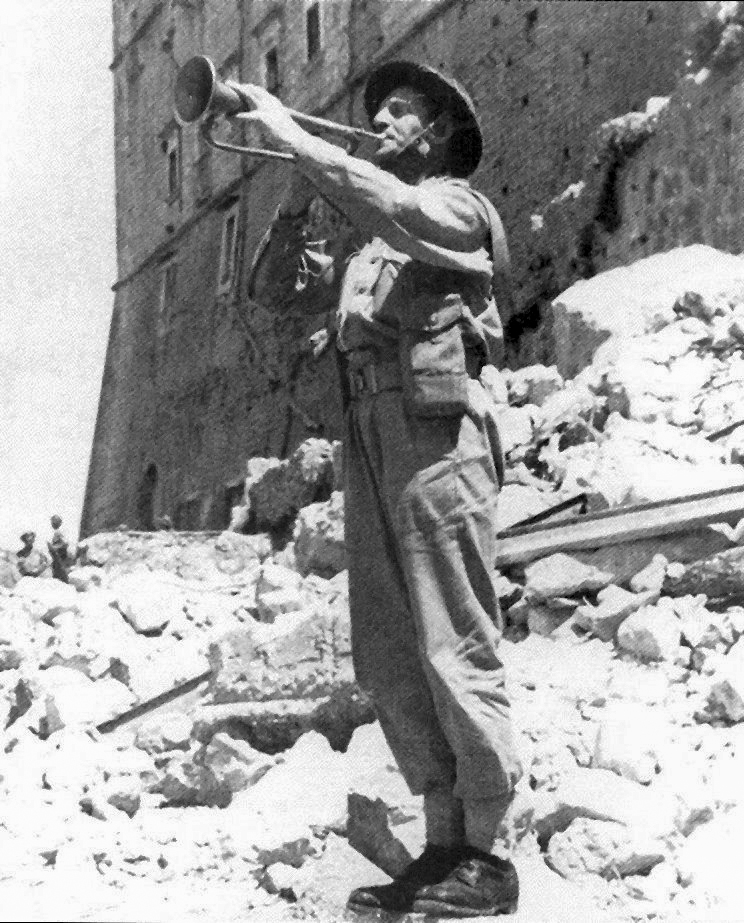
A Polish soldier, Master Corporal Emil Czech, plays the Hejnał Mariacki in the Monte Cassino monastery ruins.

The armament was as follows:

- 248 pieces of artillery
- 288 anti-tank guns
- 234 anti-aircraft guns
- 264 tanks
- 1,241 APCs
- 440 armoured cars
- 12,064 cars, Bren carriers and trucks
- 1 Syrian brown bear Wojtek (soldier bear)

== Losses ==
During the Italian Campaign, the Polish II Corps lost 11,379 men. Among them were 2,301 killed in action, 8,543 wounded in action and 535 missing in action.

Of the 2,301 killed, 1,079 died during the Battle of Monte Cassino and are interred at the Monte Cassino Polish war cemetery, several hundred meters from the rebuilt abbey.

== Order of battle ==
=== Corps Organisation April 1944 ===
- HQ 2 Polish Corps
- 2 Armoured Brigade
- AGPA – Army Group of Polish Artillery
- 3 Carpathian Division
  - 12 Podolski Recce Regt. (Dismounted)
  - 1 Carpathian Rifle Brigade
    - 1,2,3 Battalions
  - 2 Squadron
    - 7 Armoured Regiment
  - 2 Carpathian Rifles Brigade
    - 4,5,6 Battalions
- 5 Kresowa Division
  - 5 Wilenska Infantry Brigade
    - 13,14,15 and 18 Battalions
  - 3 Squadron
    - 4 Armoured Regiment
  - HQ6
    - Lwowska Infantry Brigade
    - 15 Poznaski Recce Regiment (Dismounted)
    - Carpathian Lancers Regiment (Dismounted)
  - Division Reserve
    - 16, 17 Battalion

=== 1946 ===
At the time of its demobilisation in 1946, the 2nd Polish Corps establishment was as follows (note that there were some differences between this order of battle and the one at the time of the battle for Monte Cassino in 1944):

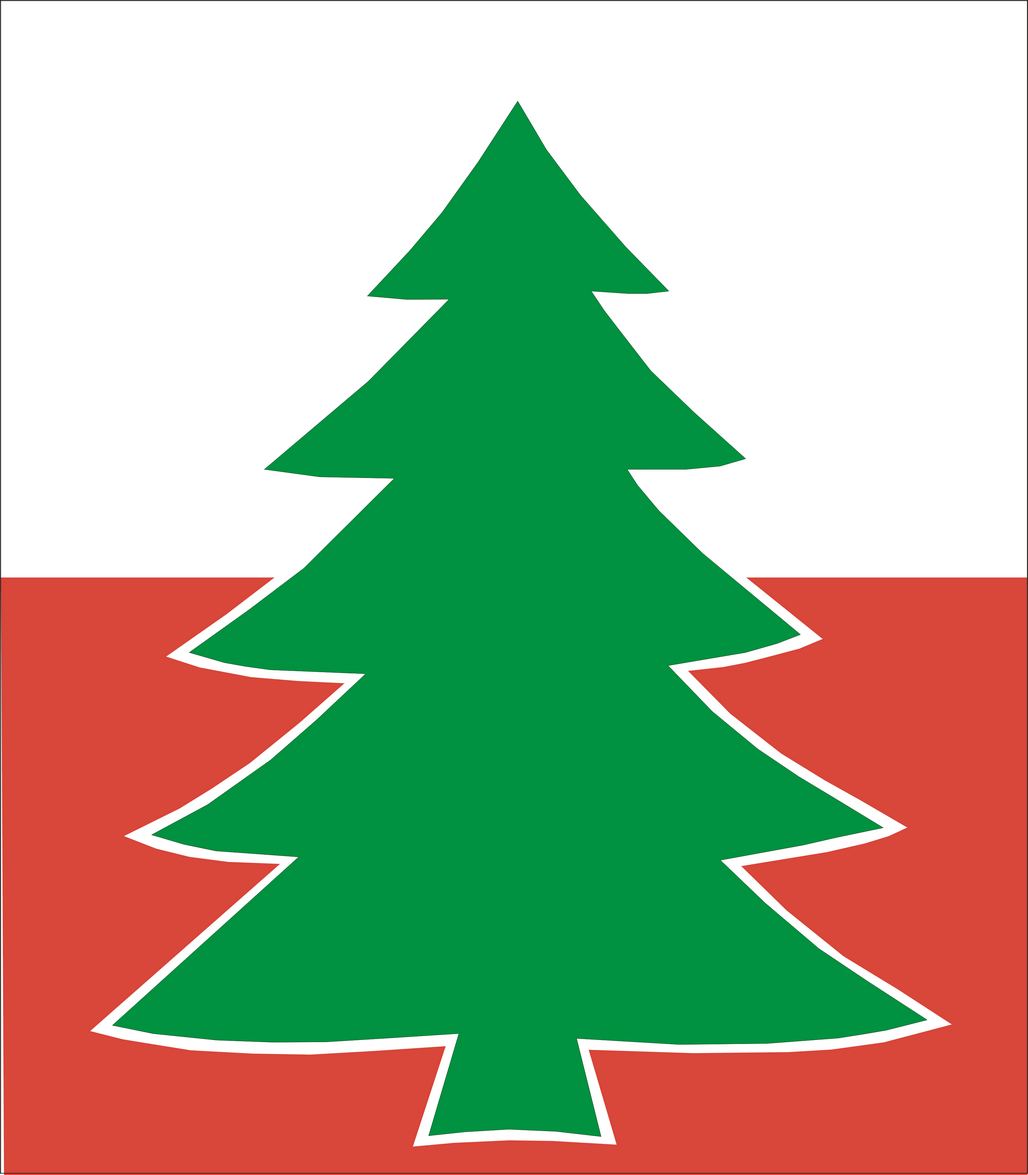
Emblem of the Polish 3rd Carpathian Rifle Division

- Polish 3rd Carpathian Infantry Division CO: Maj. Gen. Bronisław Duch
  - 1st Carpathian Rifle Brigade
    - 1st Carpathian Rifle Battalion
    - 2nd Carpathian Rifle Battalion
    - 3rd Carpathian Rifle Battalion
  - 2nd Carpathian Rifle Brigade
    - 4th Carpathian Rifle Battalion
    - 5th Carpathian Rifle Battalion
    - 6th Carpathian Rifle Battalion
  - 3rd Carpathian Rifle Brigade
    - 7th Carpathian Rifle Battalion
    - 8th Carpathian Rifle Battalion
    - 9th "Boloński" Carpathian Rifle Battalion (Named for liberating Bologna)
  - Other Divisional Units
    - 7th Lubelski Uhlan Regiment (Divisional Reconnaissance)
    - 1st Carpathian Light Artillery Regiment
    - 2nd Carpathian Light Artillery Regiment
    - 3rd Carpathian Light Artillery Regiment
    - 3rd Carpathian Anti-tank Regiment
    - 3rd Light Anti-aircraft Regiment
    - 3rd Heavy Machine Gun Battalion
    - 3rd Carpathian Sapper (Engineer) Battalion
      - 1st Carpathian Field Engineer Company
      - 2nd Carpathian Field Engineer Company
      - 3rd Carpathian Field Engineer Company
      - 3rd Carpathian Field Park Company
    - 3rd Carpathian Signals Battalion

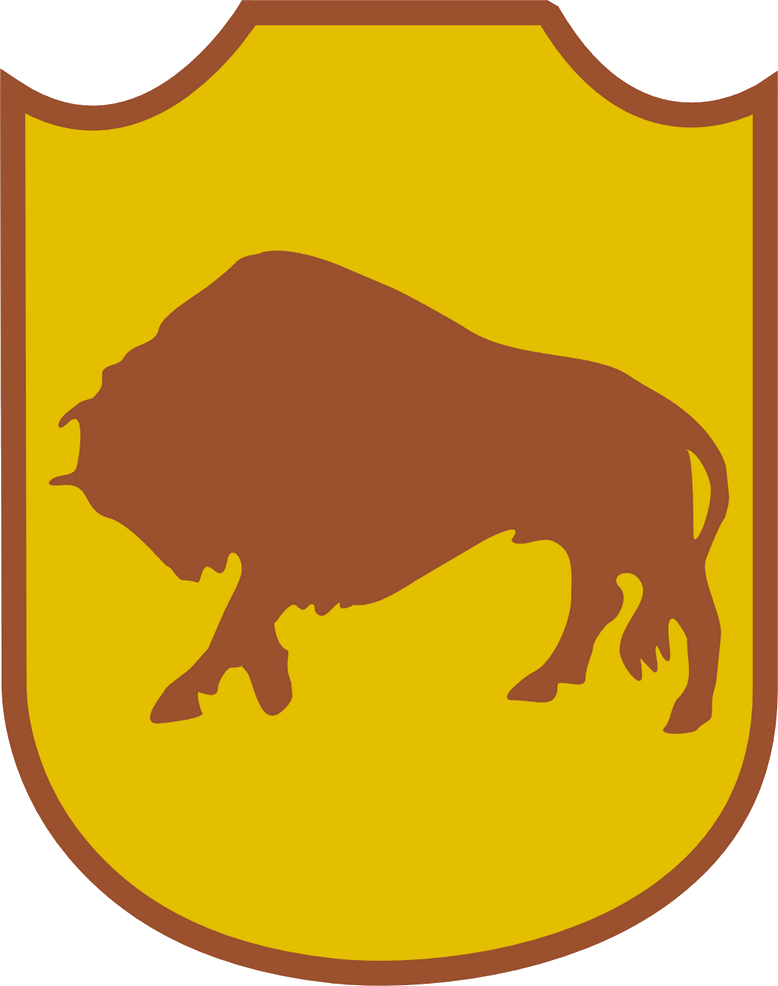
Emblem of the Polish 5th Kresowa Infantry Division

- 5th Kresowa Infantry Division CO: Brig. Gen. Nikodem Sulik
  - 4th Wolyńska Infantry Brigade
    - 10th Wolyńska Rifle Battalion
    - 11th Wolyńska Rifle Battalion
    - 12th Wolyńska Rifle Battalion
  - 5th Wilno Infantry Brigade
    - 13th Wilenski Rifle Battalion "Rysiow"
    - 14th Wilenski Rifle Battalion "Zbikow"
    - 15th Wilenski Rifle Battalion "Wilkow"
  - 6th Lwów Infantry Brigade
    - 16th Lwowski Rifle Battalion
    - 17th Lwowski Rifle Battalion
    - 18th Lwowski Rifle Battalion
  - Other divisional unit
    - 25th Wielkopolski Uhlan Regiment
    - 4th Kresowy Light Artillery Regiment
    - 5th Wileński Light Artillery Regiment
    - 6th Lwowski Light Artillery Regiment
    - 5th Kresowy Anti-tank Regiment
    - 5th Kresowy Light Anti-aircraft Regiment
    - 5th Kresowy Heavy Machine Gun Battalion
    - 5th Kresowa Sapper (Engineer) Battalion
      - 4th Kresowa Field Engineer Company
      - 5th Kresowa Field Engineer Company
      - 6th Kresowa Field Engineer Company
      - 5th Kresowa Field Park Company
    - 5th Kresowy Signals Battalion
      - 5th Military Police (Provost) Squadron

Emblem of the Polish 2nd Warszawski Armoured Division

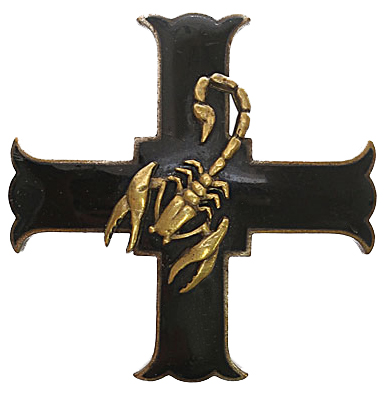
Breast badge of the 4th 'Skorpion' Armoured Regiment

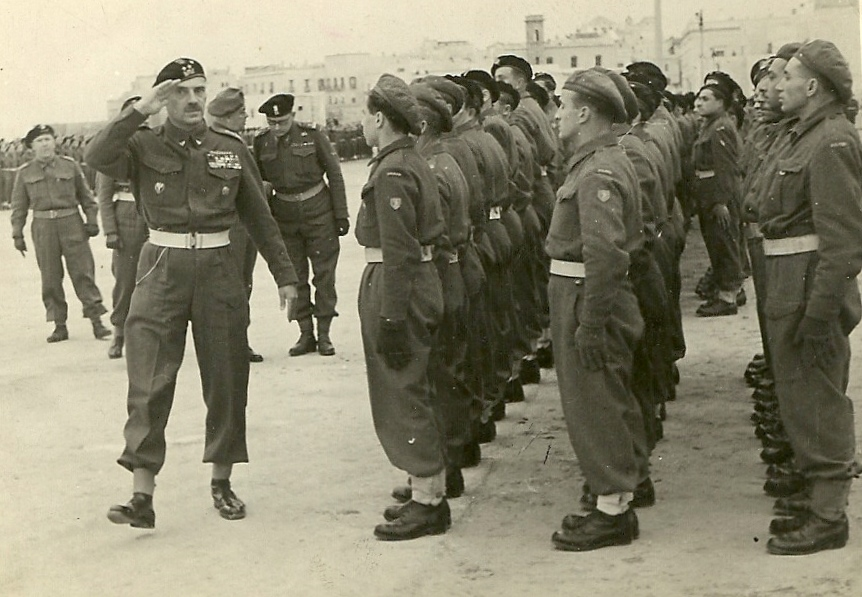
Gen. Anders inspecting Armoured Forces Training Centre with Gen. Przewlocki and Col. Szostak in the background Italy 1945

- 2nd Warsaw Armoured Division. CO: Brig.Gen. Bronisław Rakowski
  - Carpathian Uhlan/Lancer Regiment (Divisional Reconnaissance)
  - 2nd Warsaw Armoured Brigade
    - 4th 'Skorpion' Armoured Regiment
    - 1st Krechowiecki Uhlan Regiment
    - 6th 'Children of Lwów' Armoured Regiment
    - 2nd Motorised Independent Polish Commando Company
  - 16th Pomorska Infantry Brigade
    - 64th Pomorski Infantry Battalion
    - 66th Pomorski Infantry Battalion
    - 68th Pomorski Infantry Battalion
      - 16th Pomorski Support Company
  - Other divisional units
    - HQ Division Artillery
    - 7th Horse Artillery Regiment
    - 16th Pomorski Light Artillery Regiment
    - 2nd Anti-tank Regiment
    - 2nd Light Anti-aircraft Regiment
    - 2nd Warszawski Signals Battalion
    - 2nd Warszawski Engineer Battalion
      - 9th Forward Tank Replacement Squadron
      - 9th Supply Company
      - 19th Supply Company
      - 28th Supply Company
      - 9th Workshop Company
      - 16th Workshop Company
      - 2nd Armoured Division Military Police (Provost) Company
        - 9th Field Court
        - 343 Anti-malaria Section

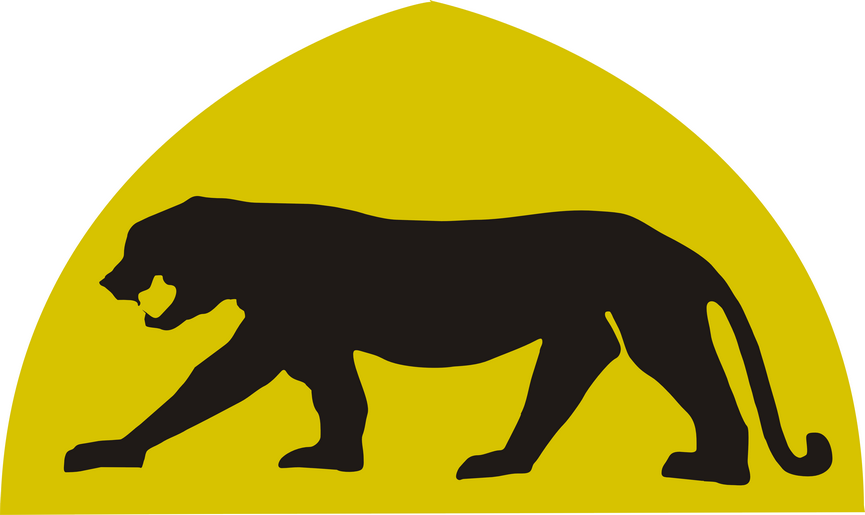
Emblem of the Polish 14th Wielkopolska Armoured Brigade

- 14th WIELKOPOLSKA Armoured Brigade
  - 15th Poznań Uhlans Regiment (Previously part of 5th Kresowa Division)
  - 3rd Śląsk Uhlan Regiment
  - 10th Hussar Regiment
    - 14th Forward Tank Replacement Squadron
    - 14th Wielkopolska Engineer Company
    - 14th Wielkopolska Signals Squadron
      - 14th Workshop Company
      - 14th Supply Company
    - 14th Military Police (Provost) Squadron
    - 16th Field Court

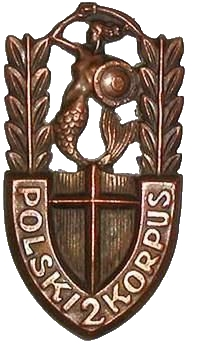
Badge of the Polish 2nd Corps

- Headquarters 2nd Corps
  - 12th Podolski Uhlan Regiment (Headquarters Recce) (Previously part of 3rd Carpathian Rifle Division)
  - 7th Armoured Regiment
  - 7th Anti-tank Regiment
  - 7th Light Anti-aircraft Regiment
  - 8th Medium Anti-aircraft Regiment
  - 10th Hussar Regiment
  - 1st Artillery Survey Regiment
  - 663 Polish Air Observation Post Squadron
    - 2nd Corp General Staff Defence Company
- 2nd Corps Artillery Group CO: Brig. Gen. LUDWIG ZABKOWSKI
  - 9th Heavy Artillery Regiment
  - 10th Medium Artillery Regiment Unit Code 3501
  - 11th Medium Artillery Regiment
  - 12th Medium Artillery Regiment
  - 13th Medium Artillery Regiment
- Other HQ Units
  - 10th Engineer Battalion
  - 1st Railway Engineer Battalion
  - 10th Bridge Engineer Company
  - 10th Bomb Disposal Platoon
  - 301 Engineer Company
  - 306 Engineer Material Park Platoon
  - 11th Signals Battalion
    - 11th Radio Platoon
    - 12th Information Platoon
    - 385 Signals Company
    - 386 Signals Platoon
    - 387 Signals Platoon
    - 389 Radio Platoon
    - 104 Cipher Section
    - 390 Signals Company
    - 392 Radio Platoon
    - Air Traffic Control Platoon
    - 21st Transport Company
    - 22nd Transport Company (Artillery Supply Company)
      Wojtek with artillery shell: Emblem of 22nd Artillery Supply Company
      - 61 Artillery Supply Platoon
      - 62 Artillery Supply Platoon
      - 63 Artillery Supply Platoon
      - 64 Artillery Supply Platoon
      - 65 Artillery Supply Platoon
    - 23rd Transport Company
    - 29th Ambulance Company
    - 2nd Traffic Control Squadron
    - 11th Military Police (Provost) Squadron
    - 12th Military Police (Provost) Squadron
    - 460 Military Police (Provost) Squadron
      - Investigation Platoon
      - Dog Handling Platoon
    - 12th Field Court
    - 13th Workshop Company
      - 30th Independent Workshop Platoon
    - 35th Workshop Company
    - 12th Geographic Company
      - 312 Map Store
    - 316 Transport Company: Women's Auxiliary Service (Poland)
    - 317 Transport Company: Women's Auxiliary Service (Poland)
    - 318 Mobile Canteen/Mobile Library Company: Women's Auxiliary Service (Poland)
    - 325 Supply Depot
    - 326 Supply Depot
    - 327 Supply Depot
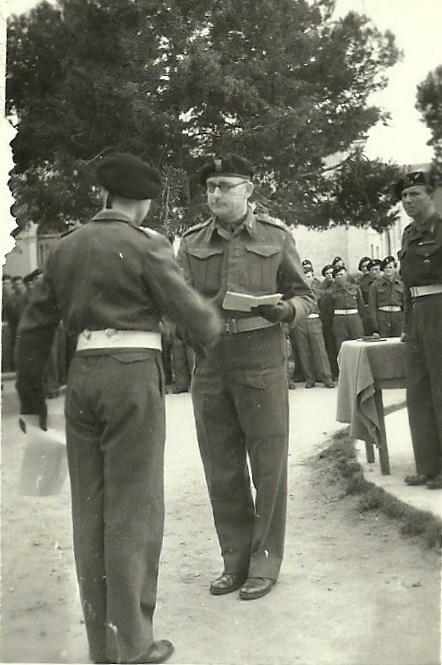
      Officer Cadet (Armoured Cavalry) Graduation Col. Szostak awarding Diplomas Italy 1945
    - 328 Supply Depot
    - 331 Field Bakery
    - 332 Field Bakery
    - 333 Field Butchery
    - 334 Fuel Depot
    - 335 Fire Fighting Team
    - 336 Stationery Supplies Depot
    - 31st Sanitary (Medical) Company
    - 32nd Field Hygiene Platoon
    - 34th Anti-malaria Section
    - Field Chemical-Bacteriological Section
    - 344 Medical Supplies Depot
    - 345 Field Surgery Team
    - 346 Field Surgery Team
    - 347 Field Surgery Team
    - 348 Field Surgery Team
    - 349 Field Blood Transfusion Team
    - 350 Field Surgery Team
    - 351 Field Surgery Team
    - 352 Field Blood Transfusion Team
    - 370 Material Salvage Depot
    - 371 Material Salvage Depot
    - 372 Material Salvage Depot
    - 375 Field Bath
    - 375 Field Bath and Laundry
    - 40 Material Park: Transport Section
    - 413 Forward Ammunition Depot
    - 104 Central Field Post Office
      - 117 Field Post Office
      - 127 Field Post Office
    - 55 Mobile Stores Repair Platoon
- 2nd Corps Base CO:Gen Przewlocki
  - Guard Battalion A
  - Guard Battalion B
  - Guard Battalion C
  - Guard Battalion D
  - 1st Military Hospital
  - 3rd Military Hospital
  - 3rd Field Hospital (Former 3rd Casualty Clearing Station)
  - 5th Field Hospital (Former 5th Casualty Clearing Station)
  - 14th Field Court
    - Officer Topographic School
    - Officer Cadet Reserve Artillery School
    - Officer Cadet Supply & Transport School
    - Armoured Forces Training Centre CO LtCol Stanislaw Szostak
    - General W. Anders Officer Cadet Armoured Cavalry School
- 7th Infantry Division Reserve Unit
  - 17th Infantry Brigade
    - 21st Infantry Battalion
    - 22nd Infantry Battalion
    - 7th Armoured Regiment
    - 17th Artillery Regiment
      - 17th Machine Gun Company
      - 17th Engineer Company
      - 17th Signals Company
      - 17th Workshop Company
      - 17th Engineer Company
      - 17th Military Police (Provost) Squadron

== Battles / operations ==
=== In Italy ===
1: defensive operations on the Sangro Line (31 January – 15 April 1944) (Winter Line / Gustav Line)

2: the Battle of Monte Cassino (Operation Diadem)

- Fourth Battle of Monte Cassino (24 April – 17 May 1944)
- Capture of Piedmonte (20–25 May 1944)

3: operations in Emilian Apennines (Operation Olive/ Gothic Line)

- First Battle of Ancona (30 June – 9 July 1944)
- Second Battle of Ancona (17–19 July 1944)
- The Battle of Cesena-Forli (14 August 1944)
- The Battle of Forli (14 November 1944, 24 November 1944)
- The Three Battles of Faenza (14 November – 17 December 1944)

4: defence of Senio River (2 January – 5 April 1945)

5: Lombardy Campaign – Spring 1945 offensive in Italy / Operation Grapeshot – Operation Buckland

- Battles between Senio and Santerno Rivers (9 – 12 April 1945)
- Battle of Argenta Gap / Battle for the Gaiana River (16 – 21 April 1945)
- Capture/Battle of Bologna (21 April 1945)
- Last Operations of the Polish Corps – Defeat of German Armies South of the River Po (21 April – 2 May 1945)

== See also ==
- Anders' Army
- Polish contribution to World War II
- Polish government-in-exile
- Polish I Corps
- Polish First Army
- Władysław Grydziuszko
- Western betrayal
- Polish British
- Polish Resettlement Corps
