= Armoured Forces Training Centre =

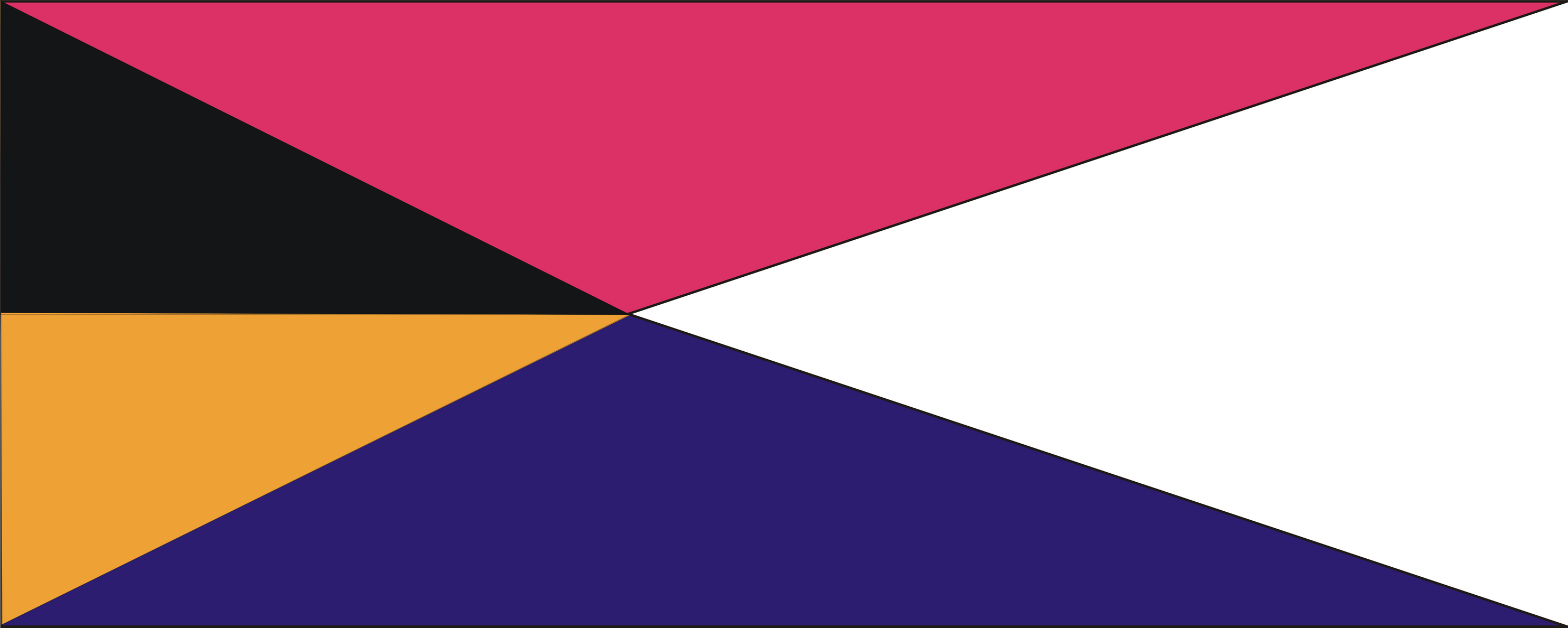
- Burgee
- Active: 1944 - 1947
- Country: Poland
- Allegiance: Polish Government in Exile
- Branch: Polish Army
- Role: Armoured warfare,
- Garrison/HQ: Italy

Commanders
- Notable commanders: Stanislaw Szostak

Armoured Forces Training Centre - Armoured Forces Training Centre of the Polish Forces in the West.

In December 1944 Gen Anders ordered formation of the Armoured Forces Training Centre in Italy. The Centre was to be commanded by Lt Col Szostak and administered by the base of the 2nd Corps. Training personnel was appointed by the commanding officers of the 2nd Armoured Brigade, the Carpathian Ulan Regiment, the 7th Armoured Regiment and the 7th Anti-tank Artillery Regiment. The Centre was to retrain officers and train tank drivers, armoured car drivers, gunners, self-propelled and tractor artillery drivers, and radio operators. The trained personnel was to be sent to the 7th Armoured Regiment for further specialist training according to the training programmes prepared by Lt. Col Szostak. Subsequently they were allocated to the front line regiments. Units of the Centre were located in the neighbouring Italian towns.

- Gallipoli : headquarters, Armoured Reconnaissance Unit, General W. Anders Officer Cadet Armoured Cavalry School and Signals Squadron
- Galatone: battle tank and artillery units
- Alezio: reserve battle tank unit
- Lecce: repair unit

Work of the Centre led to the formation of the 2nd Warsaw Armoured Division. Gen Anders, secret order nr 23 of 11 May 1945, outlined the structure of the division by re-organizing and reinforcing 2nd Armoured Brigade. Field Marshal Alexander, Supreme Commander of the Allied Forces responsible for all military operations in the Mediterranean Theatre, inspected the marching troops of the Division on the fields of Loreto airfield and said "if I were to select the best unit commanded by me, I would choose you". In 1945 there were about 2000 men and instructors in the Centre. In August 1946 the Centre was shipped to the United Kingdom and joined the Polish Resettlement Corps.

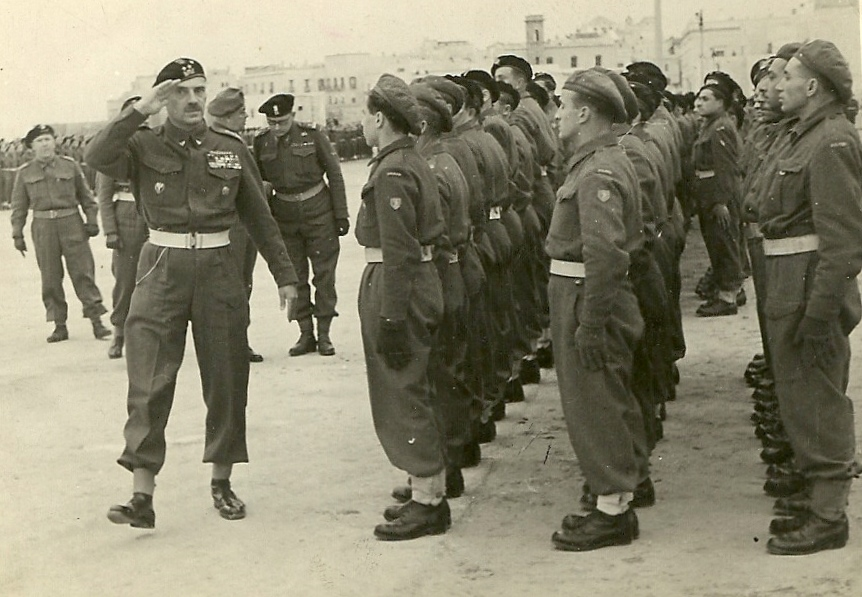
Gen Wladyslaw Anders in Centre

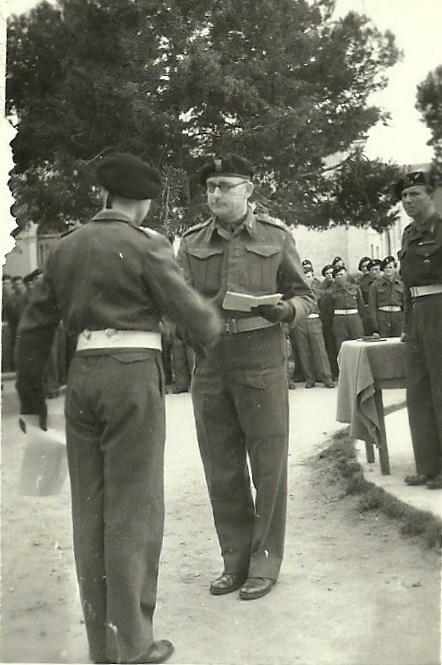
Officer Cadet (Armoured Cavalry) graduation in Gallipoli 1945

== Command structure ==
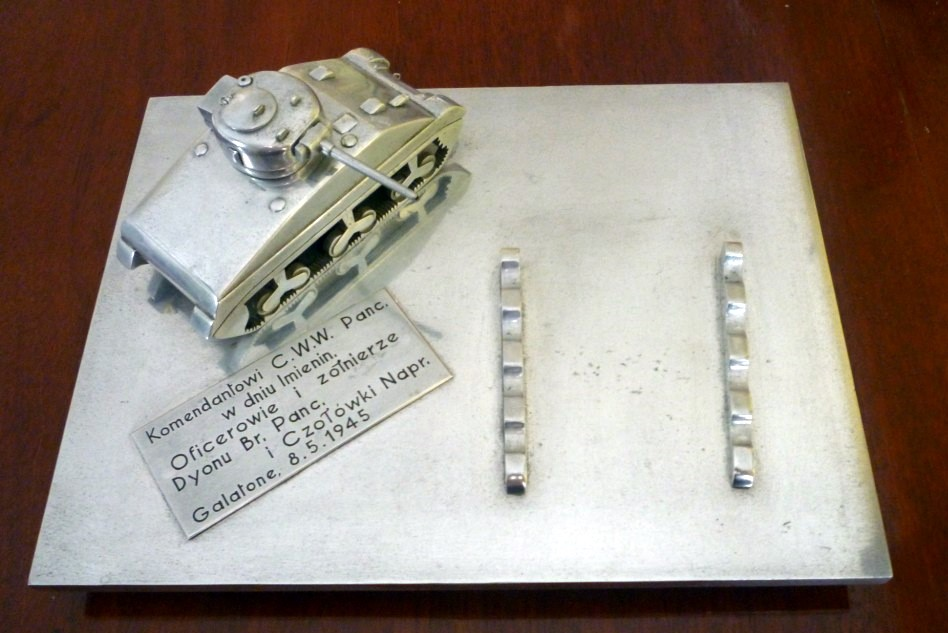
"Sherman" presented to Col Szostak by the Battle Tank and Repair Units on 8 May 1945

- Commander: Lt Col Szostak
- Deputy Commander: Mjr C. Florkowski
- Battle Tank Unit: C.O. Mjr W. Samira

The unit consisted of: Introductory Training Squadron, Battle Tank Squadron, Tank Gunner Training Squadron, Tank Driver Training Squadron

- Armoured Cavalry Unit: C.O. Capt. Cichocki

The unit consisted of: Introductory Training Squadron, Armoured Car and Tank Squadron, Gunner Training Squadron, Armoured Car Drivers Squadron (Stag Hounds), and Signal Squadron

- Artillery Unit: C.O. Capt. J Obierek

The Unit consisted of: Battery of Artillery Tractor Drivers, Self-Propelled Artillery Training Battery

- Reserve Battle Tank Unit: C.O. Capt. M. Kosiewicz

The Unit consisted of 3 squadrons

- General W. Anders Officer Cadet Armoured Cavalry School: C.O. Capt. C. Orzeszko

The School consisted of: Tank Study Section, Tank (type C) Repair Section

== Bibliography ==
- A. Suchcitz, M. Wroński: Barwa Pułku 7 Pancernego- zarys monograficzny. Wydawnictwo Instytutu Tarnogórskiego. Tarnowskie Góry 2002.
- Lalak Zbigniew: Broń pancerna w PSZ 1939-1945. Pegaz-Bis: O.K. Media. Warsaw 2004. ISBN 83-922002-0-9
- Marian Żebrowski - "Zarys historii polskiej broni pancernej 1918-1947". Zarząd Zrzeszenia Kół Oddz. Broni Pancernej. London 1971.
