= 32nd Armoured Reconnaissance Group =

Polish reconnaissance unit in the Polish September Campaign

- 32 Dywizjon Pancerny
- Active: August 25 – September 24, 1939
- Country: Poland
- Branch: Polish Army
- Role: Armoured warfare

Commanders
- Notable commanders: Stanislaw Szostak

32nd Armoured Reconnaissance Group (Polish: 32 Dywizjon Pancerny) – Polish reconnaissance unit in the Polish September Campaign.

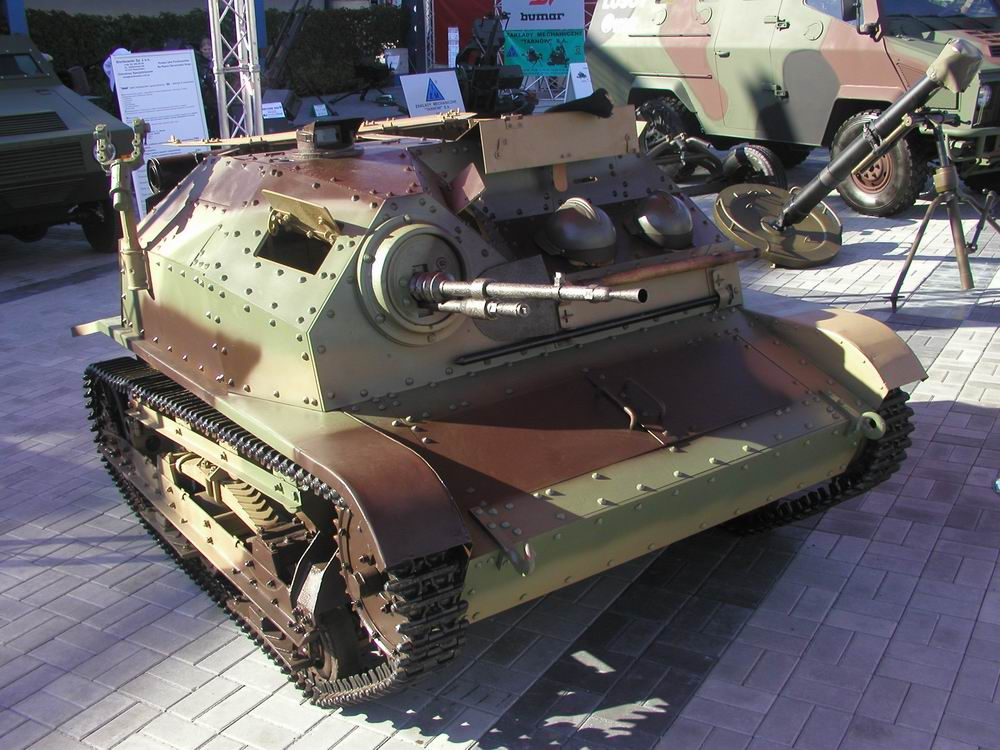
Tankette TKS

== Mobilisation ==
The 32nd Armoured Reconnaissance Group was mobilised in August 1939 by the 7th Armoured Battalion stationed in Grodno, for the Podlaska Cavalry Brigade. Mjr Stanisław Szostak was given the command of the group.

The group consisted of one tankette squadron with 13 TKS tankettes armed with heavy machine guns, 1 armoured car squadron with 8 type 34-II armoured cars armed with a 37 mm cannon and 2 machine guns and one transport squadron with a repair vehicle, tankers and lorries.

== September campaign ==
On September 2, the tankette squadron supported the 9th Mounted Rifle Regiment in capturing Groß Brzosken in East Prussia defended by German border guards and units of the Landwehr. As there were no major German units in the area, the Polish forces withdrew back into Poland. On September 3/4, Germans broke through the Polish defence lines west of the Podlaska Cavalry Brigade. The brigade was ordered to slow down the German advance. From that day, the group's armoured squadrons gave mobile machine gun and cannon support to the brigade's units, fighting Panzer Division Kempf and Wehrmacht. The group suffered losses both in armour and men.

On September 13, covering the brigade's fighting retreat, the group found itself behind German lines near Wyliny-Ruś, which was burnt by the Germans as a reprisal for a successful attack by the group. In the village there are graves of two Polish soldiers killed in 1939. The group managed to break through the German lines suffering further losses and, on 14 September, rejoined the brigade, in the Pietkowo forest near Łapy. Gen. Ludwik Kmicic-Skrzyński, CO of the brigade, decided to withdraw to Białowieża Forest and allowed the group to cross the Narew and proceed to Vawkavysk. The river was crossed on 15 September over a railway bridge near Strabla. It reached the town on 16 September, albeit after having lost the remnants of its armour.

=== Soviet invasion of Poland ===
On September 17, the Soviet invasion of Poland began and Mjr Szostak was ordered to drive to Wilno to join the defence of the town. The Battle of Wilno was quickly won by the Soviets. Thus, a new order was issued, on September 19, for the Polish troops to cross the Lithuanian border. Mjr Szostak refused to cross the border and decided to drive to Grodno to fight the Soviets with his men having been joined by a platoon of anti-aircraft artillery (Bofors 40 mm L/60 gun) of the 94th Anti-Aircraft Battery commanded by 2nd Lt. Musial.

==== Battle of Grodno ====
In the morning of September 20, they reached Grodno which was under attack by Soviet forces. In the morning of September 21, from the barracks of the 7th Armoured Battalion, they machine gunned advancing Soviet infantry who found themselves in the cross fire and retreated after suffering heavy losses. Later in the day, on the orders of Gen. Wacław Przeździecki, the group started to withdraw towards the Lithuanian border.

On September 22, Mjr Szostak organised the defence of Giby but not having received the requested anti-tank weapons and explosives, he decided to continue the withdrawal to Lithuania.

On September 24, Mjr Szostak and his men crossed the border near Szypliszki and were interned by the Lithuanians. About an hour later, Soviet tanks arrived at the Lithuanian border.

== Aftermath ==
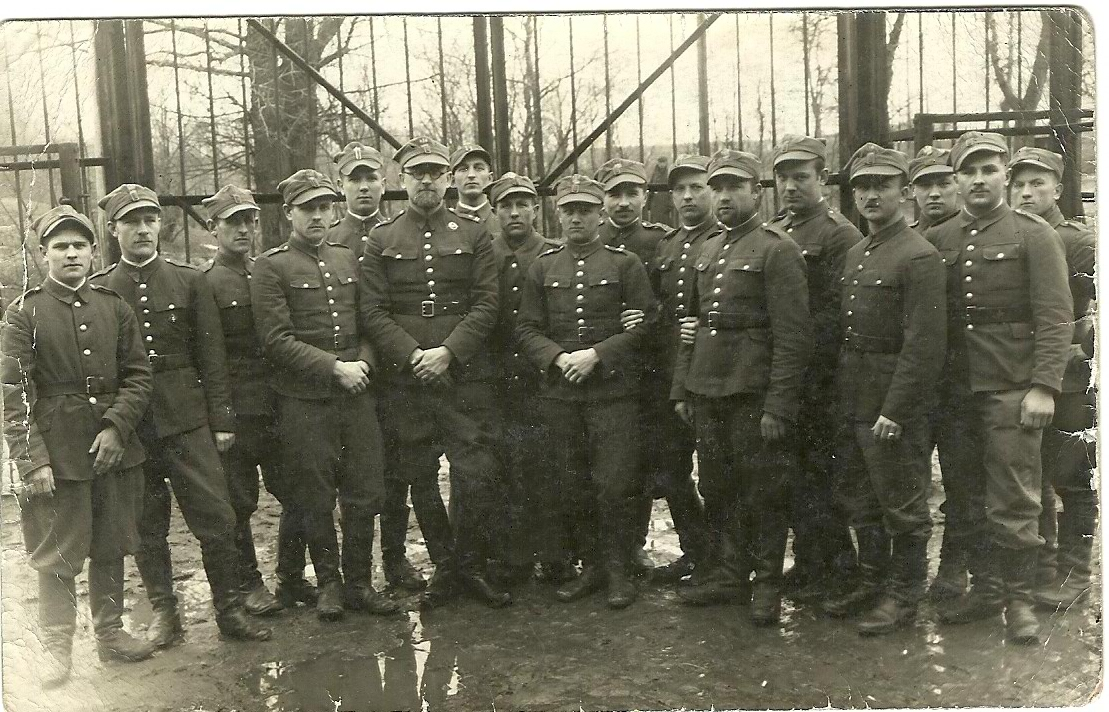
Soldiers in Kaunas with Mjr Szostak

Subsequently, the officers and soldiers of the 32nd Armoured Reconnaissance Group served in the 2nd Polish Corps (Polish Armed Forces in the West), which was part of the British 8th Army.

Lt. Strokowski was killed by a Lithuanian internment camp guard.

== Command Structure ==
- Commander: Mjr Stanislaw Szostak
- Adjutant: Lt Wlodzimierz Zeltzer

Tankette Squadron:

- C.O. Lt Janusz Zongollowich
- C.O. 1st Platoon: Lt Jerzy Rudolph
- (C.O. 2nd Platoon: Officer Cadet (sergeant) Wereszczaka

Armoured Car Squadron

- C.O.: Lt Alexander Strokowski
- C.O. 1st Platoon: 2nd Lt Tadeusz Stopczyk
- C.O. 2nd Platoon: Officer Cadet (sergeant) Zoledziewski

Transport Repair Squadron

- C.O.: 2nd Lt Wladyslaw Kitowski

== Bibliography ==
- Marian Żebrowski: Zarys historii polskiej broni pancernej 1918–1947. Zarząd Zrzeszenia Kół Oddziałowych Broni Pancernych. Londyn 1971
- Szubański Rajmund Polska broń pancerna 1939 Wydaw. Min. Obrony Narodowej Warszawa 1989
- A. Suchcitz, M. Wroński: Barwa Pułku 7 Pancernego – zarys monograficzny. Wydawnictwo Instytutu Tarnogórskiego. Tarnowskie Góry 2002
- "Taran" – Jednodniówka Podchorązych Broni Pancernej. Irak 1943
- Karol Liszewski: "Wojna Polsko-Sowiecka 1939". Polska Fundacja Kulturalna. Londyn 1986
