= Byerazino =

Town in Minsk Region, Belarus

Byerazino Беразіно (Belarusian)
- Town
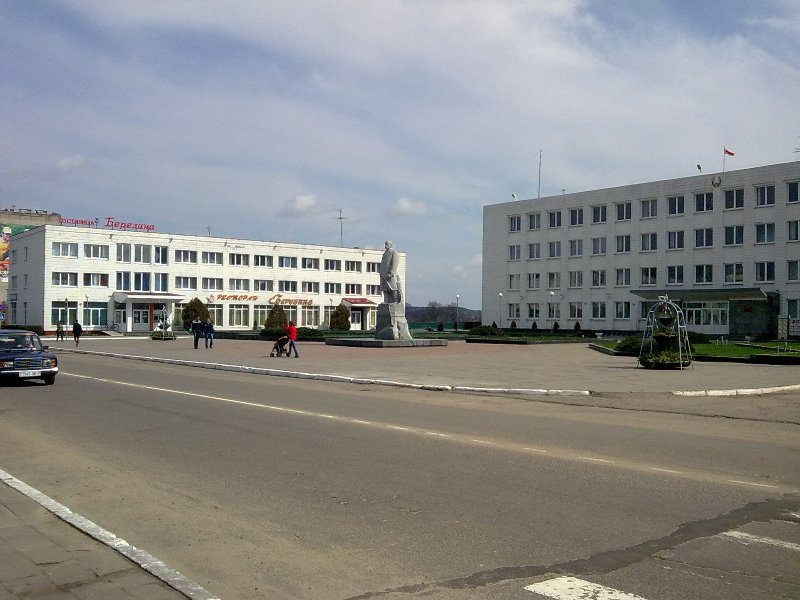

- Location within Belarus
- Coordinates: 53°50′N 28°59′E
- Country: Belarus
- Region: Minsk Region
- District: Byerazino District

Population (2026)
  - Total: 11,125
- Time zone: UTC+3 (MSK)

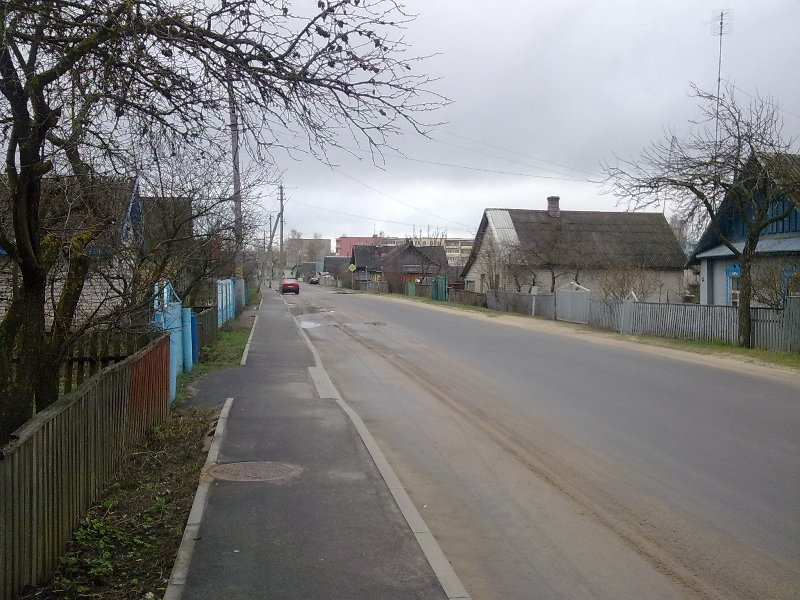

Byerazino or Berezino (Note: Belarusian: Беразіно, romanized: Bierazino; Russian: Березино; Polish: Berezyna; Lithuanian: Berezinas; Yiddish: בערעזין, romanized: Berezin.) is a town on the Berezina River in Minsk Region, Belarus. It is located 100 kilometres (62 mi) east of the capital Minsk, and serves as the administrative center of Byerazino District. As of 2026, it has a population of 11,125.

== History ==
=== Early history ===
Although there are no documented points to determine the original founding date of the settlement on the territory of the present Berazino, it is believed that it originated as a trading post on the River Berezina which was part of the trade route from the Varangians to the Greeks of the Kievan Rus. The first chronicles of a settlement date from 1501, which is believed to be the present date of its founding.

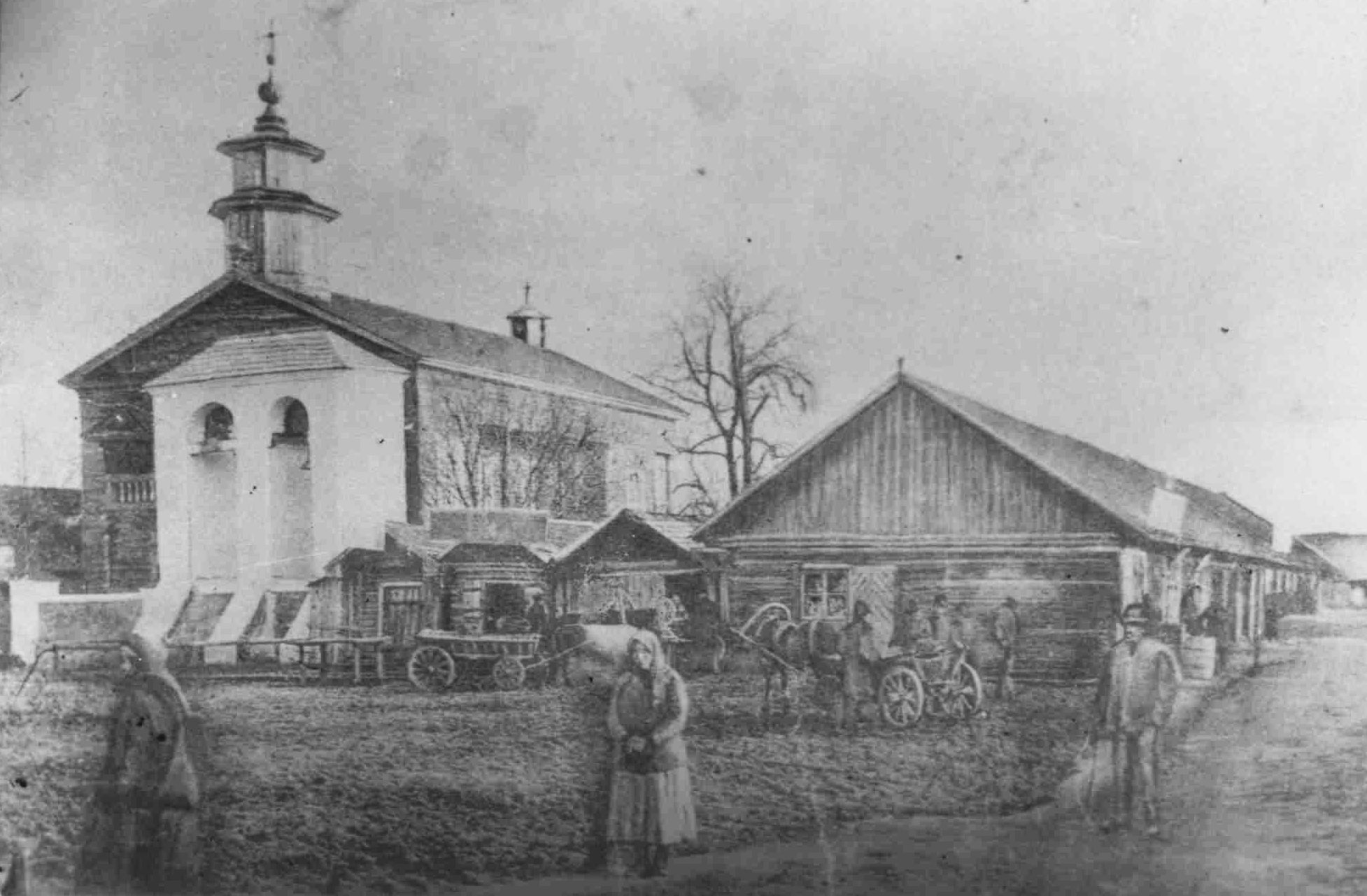
A street in 1914

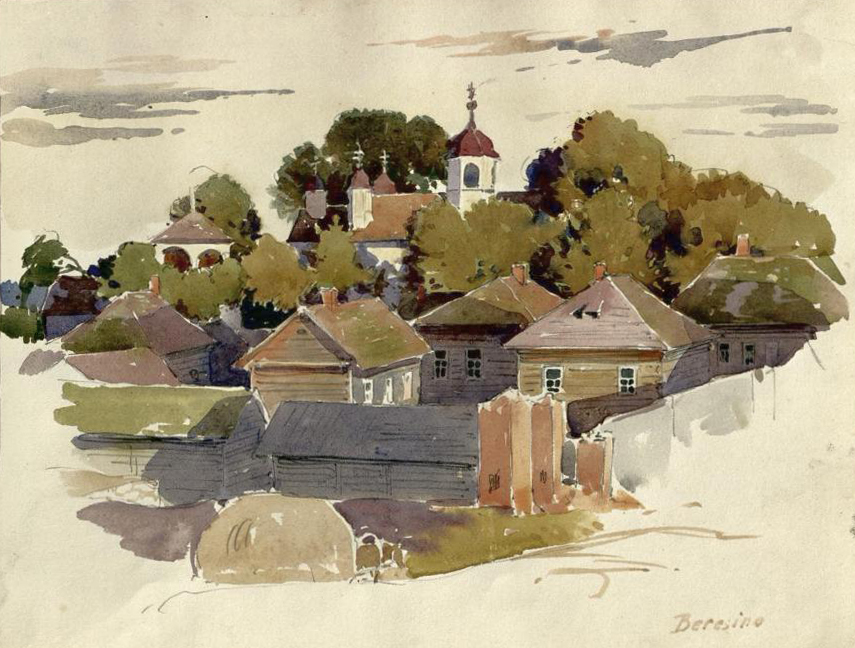
A view of Berezino, as sketched by the German soldier Curt Sauermilch, 1918

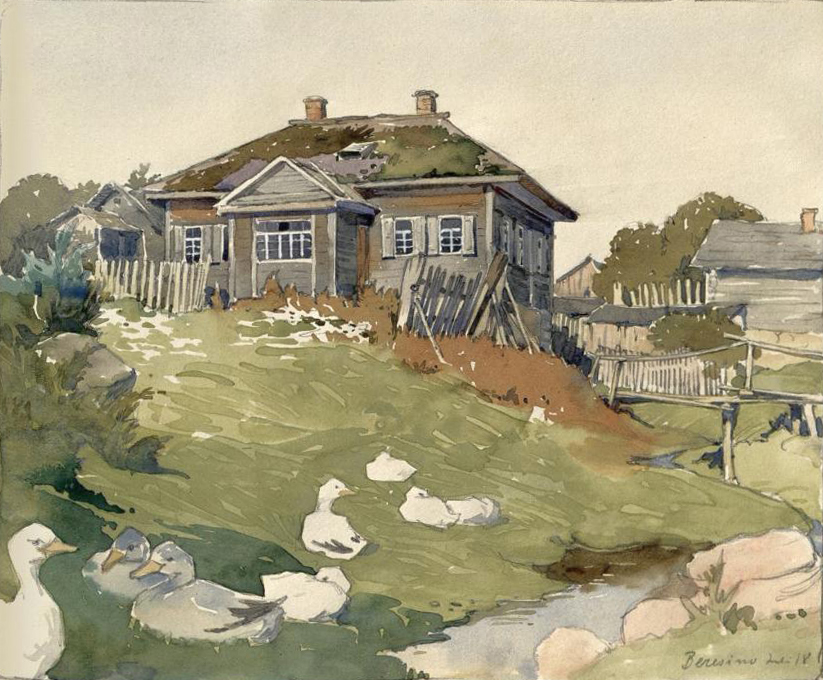
Another drawing

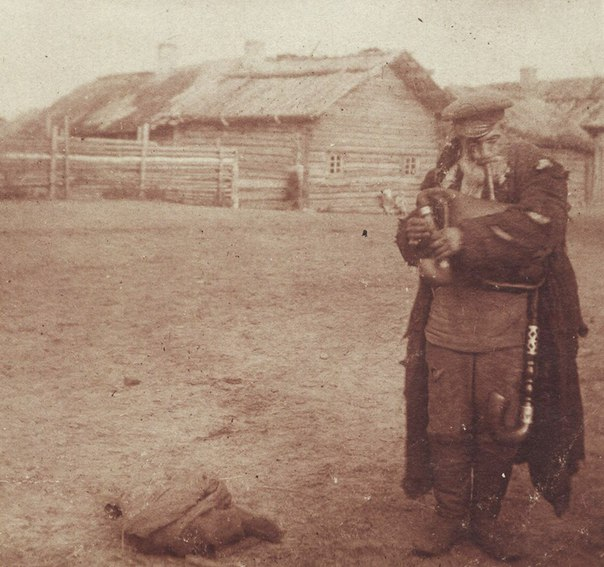
Man playing the bagpipes, 1919

During the middle of the 16th century, the city belonged to one of the mightiest dynasties of the Great Duchy of Lithuania - the Sapieha Family, who controlled many other territories in Central Belarus. In 1641 the Duke Kazimierz Leon Sapieha built a wooden Catholic Church which became one of the central attractions of the town. In the course of the Russo-Polish War (1654–1667) the city was captured by Russian-Cossack forces in 1655, but was taken away from them and in 1661 became part of the Minsk Voivodeship.

During the Northern War in 1708, upon Charles XII's attempt to storm into the Rzecz Pospolita, releasing the Russian/Rzecz Pospolita blockade in neighbouring Barysaw, the Swedish king used Berazino to cross the Berezina River instead, however the conquest ended with the Battle of Poltava further south.

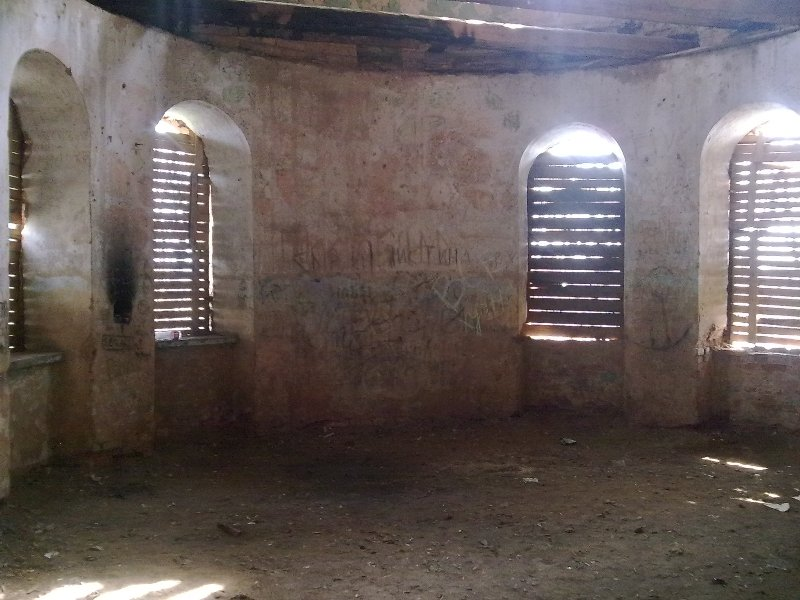
Inside the long-abandoned Potocki manor, surprisingly listed as Cultural heritage of Belarus

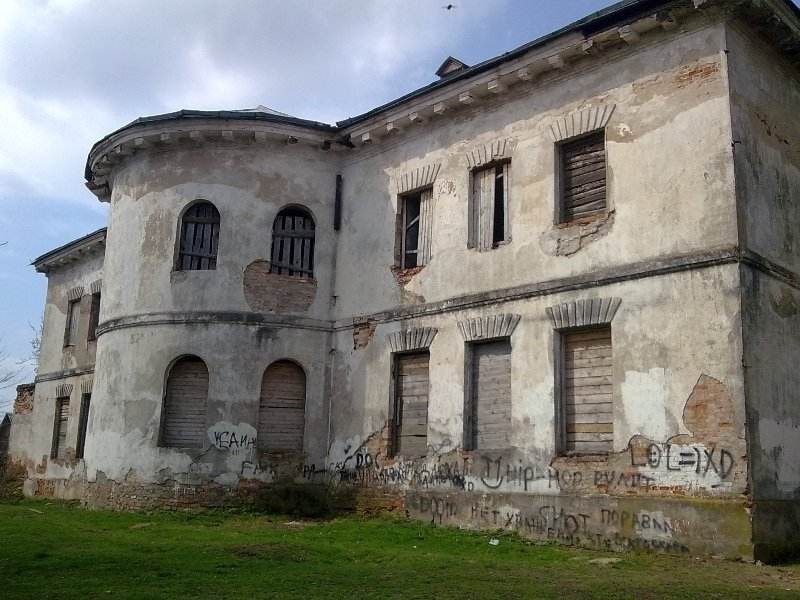
A view of the manor from the outside

=== Russian period ===
In 1793, the town was annexed by the Russian Empire in the course of the Second Partition of Poland. There are different versions of who owned the town after the Sapieha Family. The most logical version by berezino.net is that Sapieha owned the town until partition took place in 1793, and Berezino was granted by Empress Ekaterina II to Count Ludwik Tyszkiewicz. From him, the Berezino estate went to his daughter Anna Tyszkiewicz (married 1st time Potocka, 2nd time Wasowicz.) Anna Tyszkiewicz-Potocka-Wasowicz should be remembered in Berezino particularly well since she resuscitated the Roman Catholic Church in 1803, and built the Palace well before 1850. She tried to revive the Berezino region economically by starting a carpet factory in Horenichi village, but the investment didn't survive for long. The town was under French/Polish command in 1812 during Napoleon's Eastern Campaign, where his failed advance on Moscow was defeated fully by the forces of General Barclay de Tolly in early 1813. The town was in Potocki (pronounced Pototski) family possession well until June 1920, when the Bolshevik Red Army attacked Poland and subsequent peace treaty changed the Soviet-Polish borders as the place become part of Soviet territory. Last owner of Berezino was Count Antoni-Ludwik Potocki.

During the latter half of the 19th century, the town profited from its geographical position and in 1897 was noted to have 4871 residents, of which 3377 were Jews. By the start of World War I, it became a large river port which loaded goods (mostly salt and timber) and shipped them down the river to the Baltic Ports. Also, the liquor and alcohol industry began to be developed, including the Potocki's Vodka Distillery (est. 1893). It is considered the brilliant investment by Potocki family---to date, the most profitable enterprise, supplying much of the town budget and tax revenues.

=== Soviet period ===
In the aftermath of the Russian Revolution of 1917, the town changed hands several times, including German and Polish armies during the Russian Civil War and the Polish-Bolshevik War. The Jewish population suffered especially during the pogroms that took place around this time. Finally, on June 7, 1920, Berazino became part of the Byelorussian Soviet Socialist Republic. From June 17, 1924, as a separate raion centre in the Barysaw District and in June 1927 - Minsk District. Eventually, the town grew, and on 15 February 1938 became part of the Mogilev Province. During that time, mass industrialisation took place, and the position of the river port allowed a development of shipbuilding, wheel, textile and liquor factories, as well as smaller workshops for automobiles and wood fabrics. The population also rose from 2,968 in 1930 to 4,800 in 1939, 1,530 of whom were Jewish.

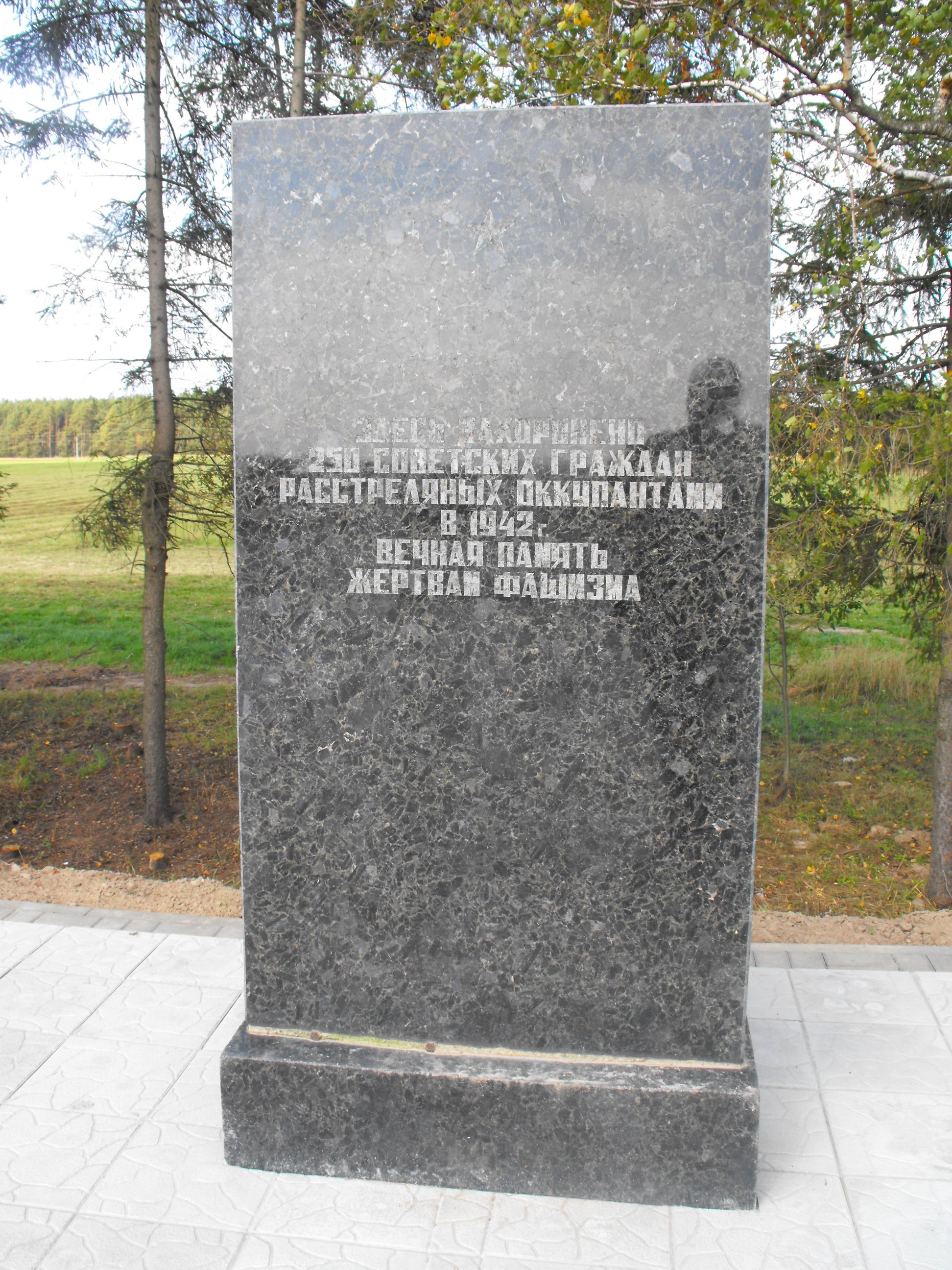
Monument at a spot where 250 Jews were shot by German occupiers in 1942. As is typical in Soviet historiography, their Jewishness is not mentioned: there is only talk of Soviet citizens.

During World War II, Byerazino was occupied by Nazi Germany from 3 July 1941 until 3 July 1944. During this time, Byerazino, like the rest of the eastern part of Belarus, was under the direct military administration of the Wehrmacht, unlike central, western and southern Belarus, which were under German civilian administration. The Germans put all Jews they found in Byerazino and the surrounding areas into a ghetto. More than 1,000 Jews were killed in Byerazino during the occupation. The town was reconquered by the 2nd Byelorussian Front on 3 July 1944 during operation "Bagration".

In September 1944, Byerazino became part of the Berazino District of Minsk Region, and on July 7, 1968, became a city. Presently, the town occupies an area of 1.9 square kilometres (0.73 sq mi) and its population is 13,300 people (1998).

== Climate ==
Climate data for Byerazino (1991–2020)
Month	Jan	Feb	Mar	Apr	May	Jun	Jul	Aug	Sep	Oct	Nov	Dec	Year
Record high °C (°F)	4.4 (39.9)	5.5 (41.9)	13.0 (55.4)	22.8 (73.0)	27.5 (81.5)	30.0 (86.0)	31.1 (88.0)	30.9 (87.6)	25.8 (78.4)	19.4 (66.9)	11.4 (52.5)	6.0 (42.8)	31.1 (88.0)
Mean daily maximum °C (°F)	−1.9 (28.6)	−0.7 (30.7)	4.8 (40.6)	13.2 (55.8)	19.3 (66.7)	22.8 (73.0)	24.7 (76.5)	23.8 (74.8)	17.9 (64.2)	10.6 (51.1)	3.6 (38.5)	−0.6 (30.9)	11.5 (52.7)
Daily mean °C (°F)	−4.4 (24.1)	−3.9 (25.0)	0.6 (33.1)	7.7 (45.9)	13.5 (56.3)	17.2 (63.0)	19.0 (66.2)	17.8 (64.0)	12.4 (54.3)	6.5 (43.7)	1.2 (34.2)	−2.8 (27.0)	7.1 (44.8)
Mean daily minimum °C (°F)	−6.9 (19.6)	−6.8 (19.8)	−3.1 (26.4)	2.7 (36.9)	7.8 (46.0)	11.6 (52.9)	13.6 (56.5)	12.3 (54.1)	7.7 (45.9)	3.1 (37.6)	−0.9 (30.4)	−5.0 (23.0)	3.0 (37.4)
Record low °C (°F)	−21.4 (−6.5)	−19.7 (−3.5)	−12.3 (9.9)	−3.9 (25.0)	0.2 (32.4)	4.9 (40.8)	8.5 (47.3)	5.8 (42.4)	0.0 (32.0)	−5.2 (22.6)	−10.2 (13.6)	−15.3 (4.5)	−21.4 (−6.5)
Average precipitation mm (inches)	42.9 (1.69)	38.9 (1.53)	40.2 (1.58)	37.1 (1.46)	57.4 (2.26)	73.6 (2.90)	87.9 (3.46)	62.9 (2.48)	50.2 (1.98)	53.3 (2.10)	45.2 (1.78)	42.9 (1.69)	632.5 (24.90)
Average precipitation days (≥ 1.0 mm)	10.7	9.7	8.9	6.8	9.2	9.5	10.8	8.4	7.6	9.2	9.0	11.3	111.1
Source: NOAA

== Economy ==
All of Berazino's products are sold abroad and in Belarus; the most notable production plants are:

- Crystal raw alcohol and wine materials
- Madikor construction material fabric
- Timber production plant Berezinsky leskhoz
- Dairy plant Berezinsky Syrodelny Zavod with famous cheeses and bifidum bacteria drinks
- Textile fabric Berzka

In addition, there are a few other factories. including mineral water bottling, several bakeries and smaller local fabrics.

== Education and culture ==
The city has three schools, one of which specializes in future pedagogical training. In addition there is what is known as a Centre of intellectual development, formally a school specializing in Physics and Mathematics: the centre focuses on developing youth talent, and helps guide the youth towards the correct institute for higher education in main urban centres of Belarus.

The central house of culture is the main point which also groups 22 rural points, altogether comprising 32 libraries, arts and music schools.

== Health and welfare ==
The city has a central hospital with 4 additional local clinics and 26 rural health centres. Presently, there are 55 doctors and 243 nurses. The town is the birthplace of the physicist Alexandr Borisovich.

Athletically oriented, the city has 1 gymnasium, 1 football field, two stadiums, three archeries and one pool. Many famous athletes are natives of Berazino, including Georgy Zhukovsky, Belarusian champion and part of the national team for waterpolo, Nikolay Khokol, world champion for rowing, and Valentina Sakhonchik, multiple champion of the USSR for velosports.

== Tourism ==
In total there are 110 memorials comprising sculptures, monuments and plaques. 68 buildings are deemed as architectural heritage, including the famous House of Duke Pototsky, which is very much neglected by the government. A few decades more without restoration services, the building will surely collapse. The original wooden Roman Catholic Church, founded by L. Sapieha in 1641, and upgraded by countess Anna Potocka-Wasowicz in 1802, burnt down in a huge town fire in 1914. The Berazino region also sports huge hunting and fishing resources.

== Notable people ==
- Alexander Parvus, Russian revolutionary;
- Harry Rogoff, American journalist and newspaper editor
- Hanna Rovina, Israeli actress;
- Stanislaw Szostak, Polish military commander

== Sources ==
- Megargee, Geoffrey P.; Dean, Martin (2012). The United States Holocaust Memorial Museum Encyclopedia of Camps and Ghettos 1933–1945. Volume II. Indiana University Press, United States Holocaust Memorial Museum. pp. 1646–1647. ISBN 978-0-253-35599-7.
