= Kamienna Stara =

- Village
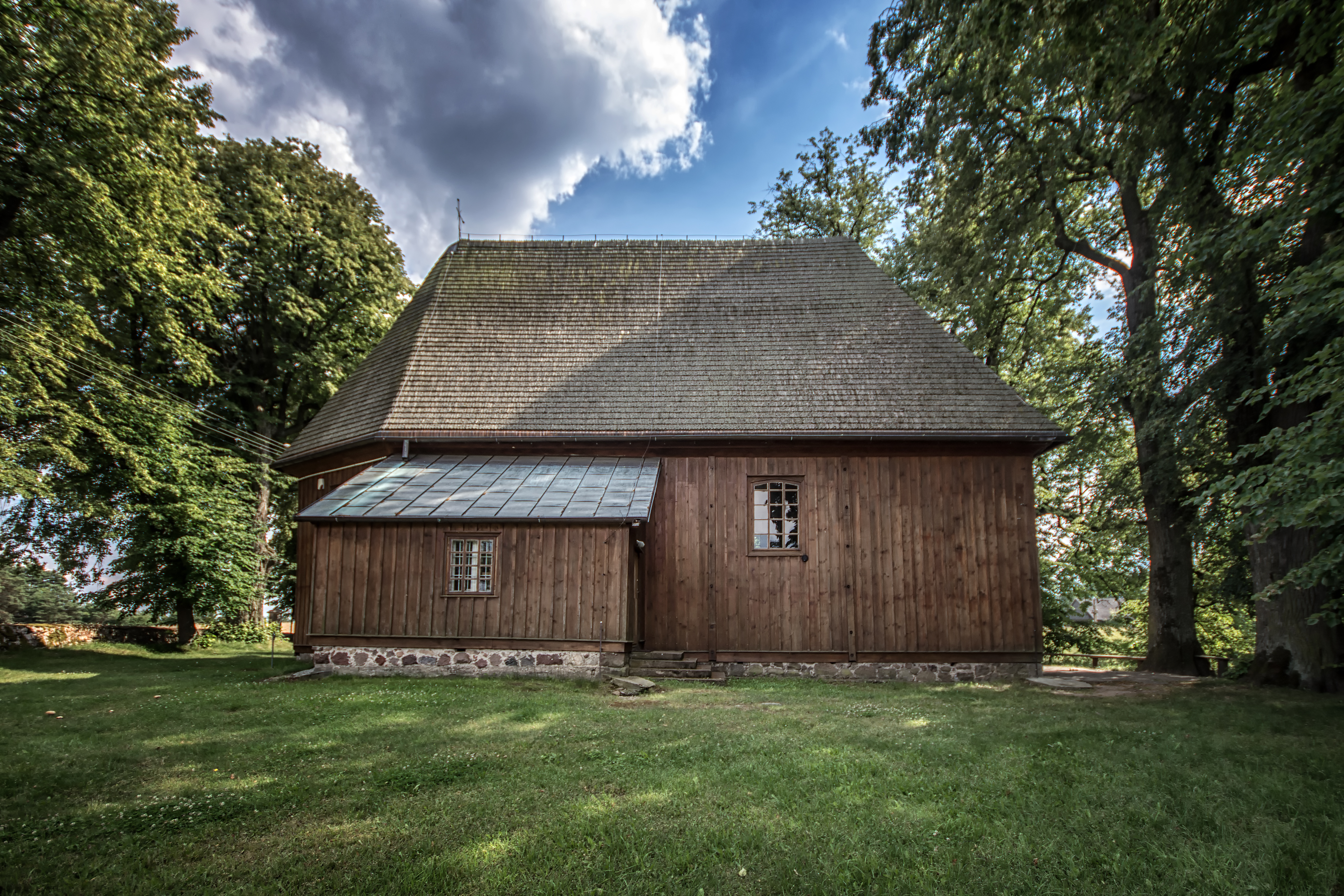
- St. Anne's Church from 1610

- Location within Poland
- Coordinates: 53°41′N 23°19′E
- Country: Poland
- Voivodeship: Podlaskie
- County: Sokółka
- Gmina: Dąbrowa Białostocka

Area
  - Total: 17.64 km^{2} (6.81 sq mi)

Population (2021)
  - Total: 270
  - Density: 15.31/km^{2} (39.7/sq mi)
- Time zone: UTC+1 (CET)
  - Summer (DST): UTC+2 (CEST)
- Postal code: 16-200
- Area code: +48 85
- Car plates: BSK
- SIMC: 0026850
- Website: kamienna-stara.pl

Kamienna Stara [kaˈmʲɛnna ˈstara] is a village in northeast Poland in the gmina of Dąbrowa Białostocka, Sokółka County, Podlaskie Voivodeship. As of 2021, it had a population of 270.

== Population ==
Historical population
| Year | Pop. | ±% p.a. |
|---|---|---|
| 1988 | 431 | — |
| 2002 | 353 | −1.42% |
| 2011 | 328 | −0.81% |
| 2021 | 270 | −1.93% |
Source: GUS

== Notable residents ==
- Nikodem Sulik-Sarnowski (1893–1954) officer of the Imperial Russian Army and brigadier general of the Polish Army
