= 5th Kresowa Infantry Division =

Unit of Polish army in WW2

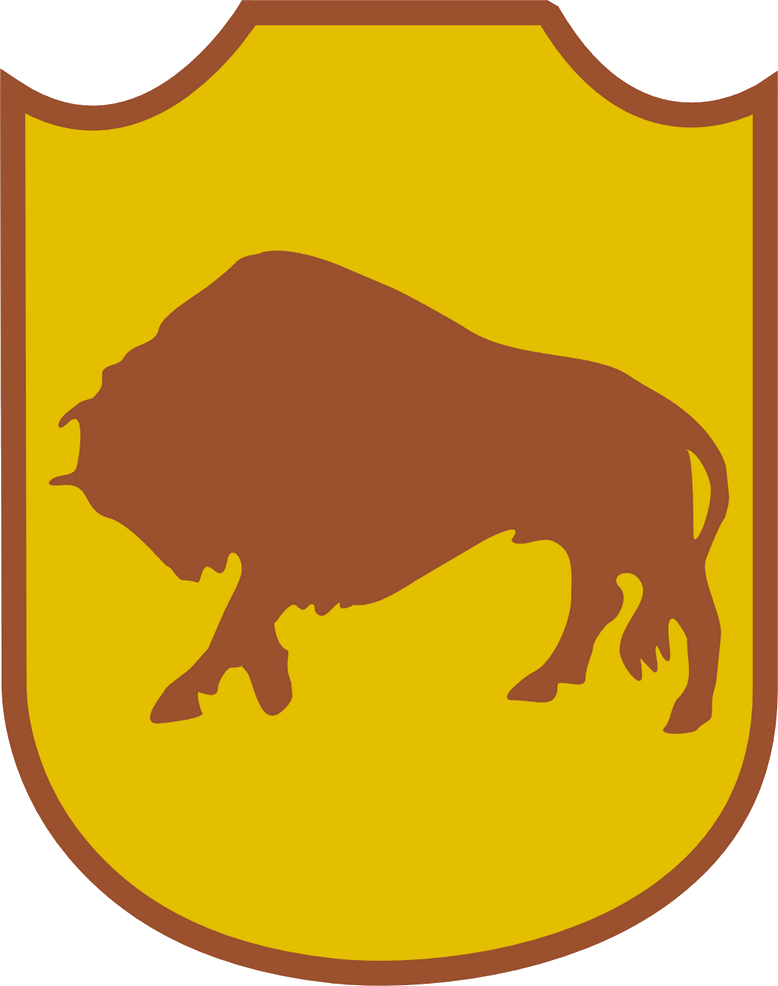
- Emblem of the division worn as a shoulder patch and painted on vehicles
- Active: 1943–1947
- Country: Second Polish Republic
- Branch: Polish Army in the West
- Type: Infantry
- Size: Division
- Part of: II Corps (Poland)
- Engagements: World War II: Italian Campaign; Battle of Monte Cassino; Battle of Ancona; Gothic Line; Operation Grapeshot; Battle of Bologna

Commanders
- Notable commanders: Zygmunt Bohusz-Szyszko (1943); Nikodem Sulik (from 1943 to 1946)

The Polish 5th Kresowa Infantry Division (Polish: 5 Kresowa Dywizja Piechoty) was an infantry division of the Polish Armed Forces in the West during World War II. Formed in March 1943, it fought in the Italian Campaign as part of Lieutenant general Władysław Anders' Polish II Corps, affiliated with the Western Allies, under command of the British Eighth Army.

== History ==
The division was formed in the Middle East in March 1943.

=== Fighting in Italy ===
The division landed in southern Italy in February 1944 and entered the line in March, as part of Polish II Corps, destined to fight in the Italian Campaign. In May it took part in the fourth and final Battle of Monte Cassino, in which it suffered a 15% casualty rate. In June/July the division participated in the Battle of Ancona. In the fall of 1944 it fought on the approaches to the Gothic Line. After the front line stabilized for the winter, the division renewed active operations in April 1945, where it took part in the final offensive in Italy, advancing to liberate Bologna at the end of the war. During its war service in Italy the division suffered 5,127 casualties, including 1,063 killed in action. The majority of these losses were sustained by the infantry battalions.

=== After the war ===
The division remained in Italy as part of Allied occupation forces until May 1946 when it was transported to Britain and then disbanded in 1947. The majority of its soldiers did not choose to return to Communist Poland, and were resettled in various Western countries (mainly Great Britain and Canada).

== Commanders ==
It was commanded by Zygmunt Bohusz-Szyszko (1943) and Nikodem Sulik (from 1943 to 1946).

== Composition ==
The division consisted of 14446 men, including 820 officers. Its component units were:

- 4th Wołyń Infantry Brigade (added in 1945)
- 5th Wilno Infantry Brigade
- 6th Lwów Infantry Brigade
- 15th Poznań Uhlans Regiment
- smaller divisional units

The division was named after the Kresy region (eastern borderlands of the Second Polish Republic).
