= Nikodem Sulik-Sarnowski =

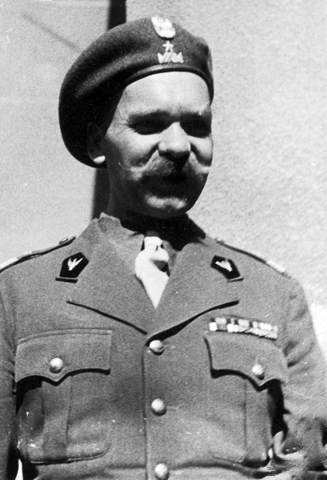
- Born: August 15, 1893; Kamienna Stara, Grodno Governorate, Russian Empire
- Died: January 14, 1954 (aged 60); London, England
- Burial place: Brompton Cemetery, London, England (until September 12, 1993, when ashes were scattered at Kamienna Stara)
- Military career
- Allegiance: Russian Empire; Second Polish Republic
- Branch: Russian Imperial Army; Polish Armed Forces; Anders' Army
- Service years: 1918–1945
- Rank: Generał brygady (Polish)
- Nicknames: "Jodko", "Jod", "Karol", "Sarnowski"
- Conflicts: World War I; Polish–Soviet War; Żeligowski's Mutiny; World War II; Invasion of Poland; Battle of Szack; Battle of Wytyczno; Battle of Kock; Italian campaign
- Awards: Gold Cross of the Virtuti Militari; Commander's Cross of the Order of Polonia Restituta (posthumous); Cross of Independence with Swords; Cross of Valour (four times); Gold Cross of Merit with Swords; Gold Cross of Merit; Monte Cassino Commemorative Cross; Home Army Cross (posthumous)

Nikodem Sulik-Sarnowski (August 15, 1893 – January 14, 1954; noms de guerre Jodko, Jod, Karol, and Sarnowski) was an officer of the Russian Imperial Army, and Generał brygady of the Polish Army.

== Biography ==
Born August 15, 1893 in the village of Kamienna Stara near Sokółka, Sulik began his military career in the Russian Army, as the part of Poland where he was born belonged to the Russian Empire. In 1918, he became a member of Samoobrona Grodzienska, a Polish organization for Grodnian self-defence; on January 22, 1919, he was named commandant of the Białystok Rifle Regiment of the 1st Lithuanian–Belarusian Division. Sulik fought in the Polish-Soviet War, and took part in the Żeligowski's Mutiny, which resulted in capturing Wilno in September 1920.

In the 1920s, Sulik served in the Polish Army and was frequently transferred between several infantry divisions. In the period September 1927 - February 1929, he was director of the Central School of the Border Guard. Transferred to Regional Office of Military Preparation in Toruń, he finally ended up in the Border Protection Corps (KOP) units located along eastern border of the Second Polish Republic. He served in the KOP in Stolpce, Baranowicze, and Sarny from October 1937 (see Sarny Fortified Area).

After the Soviet invasion of Eastern Poland on September 17, 1939, Sulik commanded KOP units in several skirmishes with the advancing Red Army troops. He did not give up his weapons after the Battle of Kock, and joined the Polish resistance. In November 1939, he was nominated as deputy to Janysz Galadyk, commandant of Wilno district of the Service for Poland's Victory. On April 13, 1941, Sulik was arrested and subsequently tortured by the NKVD, but he was released just a few months later, under the Sikorski-Mayski Agreement.

Sulik joined the Polish Armed Forces in the East, specifically to Anders' Army. Sulik, promoted to general in 1944, was commandant of the 5th Eastern Borderlands Infantry Division during the Italian Campaign of 1943 to 1945. On July 23, 1944, he was awarded the Virtuti Militari; he received the Polonia Restituta posthumously.

After the war, Sulik remained in the West, settling in London, where he died on January 14, 1954. He was buried at Brompton Cemetery, and on September 12, 1993, his and his wife's ashes were moved to his native village of Kamienna Stara.

== Promotions ==
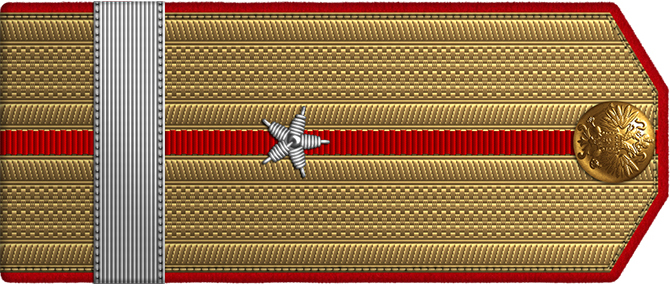
- Praporshchik (Sergeant major) - 1 November 1915
- Podporucznik (Second lieutenant) - 25 January 1919
- Porucznik (First lieutenant)
- Kapitan (Captain) - 3 May 1922
- Major (Major) - 18 February 1928
- Podpułkownik (Lieutenant colonel) - 1 January 1936
- Pułkownik (Colonel) - 1 July 1940
- Generał brygady (Brigadier general) - 1 March 1944

== Honours and awards ==
- Gold Cross of Virtuti Militari (1944)
- Silver Cross of Virtuti Militari (1922)
- Commander's Cross of the Order of Polonia Restituta (posthumously, 18 January 1954)
- Cross of Independence with Swords
- Officer's Cross of the Order of Polonia Restituta (10 November 1928)
- Cross of Valour (four times)
- Gold Cross of Merit with Swords (14 June 1943)
- Gold Cross of Merit
- Commemorative Medal for the War of 1918–1921
- Medal of the 10th Anniversary of Regained Independence
- Monte Cassino Commemorative Cross
- Cross of the Home Army (posthumously, 15 August 1967)
- Bronze Medal for Long Service
- Commander of the Legion of Merit (USA)
- Commander of the Order of the British Empire (United Kingdom)
- Commander of the Order of Saints Maurice and Lazarus (Italy)
- War Cross of Military Valor (Italy)

== Sources ==
- Krzysztof Filipow, Generał Nikodem Sulik (Kamienna Stara 1893 - Londyn 1954), Muzeum Wojska w Białymstoku, Białystok 1996, ISBN 83-86232-70-6.
- Tadeusz Kryska-Karski i Stanisław Żurakowski, Generałowie Polski Niepodległej, Editions Spotkania, Warszawa 1991, wyd. II uzup. i poprawione, s. 172.
- Rocznik Oficerski 1924, Ministerstwo Spraw Wojskowych, Oddział V Sztabu Generalnego Wojska Polskiego, Warszawa 1924, s. 79, 227, 364.
