= Tank Training Centre =

- Active: 1941 - 1943
- Country: Poland
- Allegiance: Polish Government in Exile
- Branch: Polish Army
- Role: Armoured warfare
- Garrison/HQ: Soviet Union, Middle East

Commanders
- Notable commanders: Stefan Felsztynski; Stanislaw Szostak

The Polish Army Tank Training Centre was a training unit of the Polish Tank Units in the Soviet Union, the Middle East and Italy.

== Formation ==
On 20 September 1941 Major Szostak, Commander of the Polish Armoured Forces in the Soviet Union submitted a wide-ranging training plan for the Polish Units by proposing to create a training centre of tank and transport troops to be attached to the Soviet Tank Training School in Saratov. The plan was approved by Gen Anders and submitted to the Soviet authorities in Moscow. Their agreement was never received. Then Major Szostak, on his own initiative, approached Col Rogonin commanding officer of the Saratov Tank School with a plan to train Polish units which were being formed, on the School equipment. Col Rogonin favoured the plan but its approval was never received from the Ulianovsk Military District. At the beginning of January 1942 Gen Anders ordered further enlargement of the Polish Forces in the Soviet Union. At the same time the army command started making plans to adopt British army structure and Major Szostak, on 15 Jan 1942 ordered the formation of the following units:

1. Organisation Centre of Tank Units - c.o. Capt Bronislaw Rafalski
2. Tank Training Centre - c.o. Major Felsztynski (Order 150/tjn. Br. Panc.)

Core of the Tank Training Centre was to consist of the 5th and the 6th Tank Battalions. At the beginning the Centre was located in the region of Carabalty in the vicinity of Frunze. The training started on 15 Feb. 1942. Towards the end of March troops were evacuated to Iran.

== In the 2nd Polish Corps ==
After the evacuation to the Middle East, Gen. Anders ordered re-organisation of the army. On 4 April 1942 he ordered formation of the 2nd Tank Brigade. Gen. Paszkiewicz ( c.o. of the brigade) outlined structure of the brigade and appointed commanding officers. Initially Tank Training Centre was attached to the brigade but later became a part of the Army Training Centre under a name of Transport and Tank Training Centre commanded by Major Szostak.

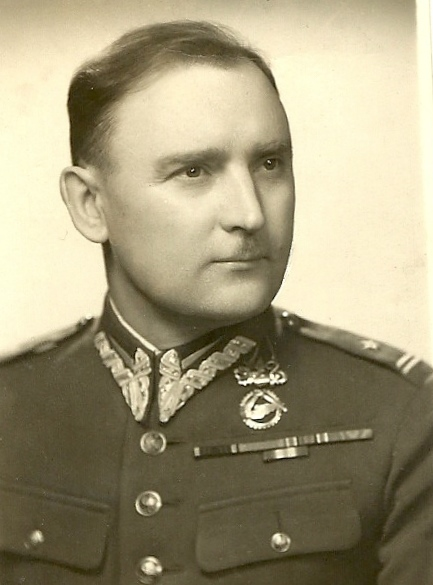
Major Stanislaw Szostak

Initially there was a shortage of the training equipment and even some light Italian tanks had to be transported to the Centre from the battlefields of North Africa. Training was progressing slowly due to the heat. On 19 October 1943 a full quota of Sherman tanks was received to train units of the 2nd Tank Brigade. The entire training of the tank units of the 2nd Polish Corps was conducted by the Centre, commanded by Lt.Col. Szostak. In March 1944 the Centre was stationed in St. Basilio and Metra in Italy and became part of the Reserve Armoured Troops Centre of the 2nd Polish Corps (Gen Anders order dated 15 April 1944). On 6 August 1944 the Centre became known as the 7th Armoured Regiment.

== Commanders ==
- Major Stefan Felsztynski
- Lt. Col Stanislaw Szostak

Deputy Commander:

- Capt. Jozef Zymirski

== Bibliography ==
- A. Suchcitz, M. Wroński: Barwa Pułku 7 Pancernego- zarys monograficzny. Wydawnictwo Instytutu Tarnogórskiego. Tarnowskie Góry 2002.
- Lalak Zbigniew: Broń pancerna w PSZ 1939-1945. Pegaz-Bis: O.K. Media. Warsaw 2004. ISBN 83-922002-0-9
- Marian Żebrowski - "Zarys historii polskiej broni pancernej 1918-1947". Zarząd Zrzeszenia Kół Oddz. Broni Pancernej. Londyn 1971.
