= Bronisław Rakowski =

Polish general (1895–1950)

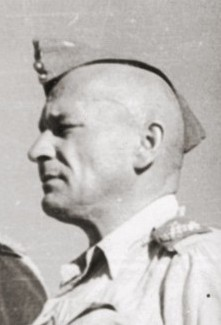
Gen. Bronisław Rakowski 1942

Bronisław Stanisław Rakowski (20 June 1895 in Szczucin – 28 December 1950 in Buenos Aires) was a Polish general. He fought in the Polish legions during World War I. As a Colonel defending Lviv he refused entry to the Soviet Army during the Soviet invasion of Poland, instead suggesting the Soviets advance on German positions, and after the city capitulated, was later imprisoned by the Soviet NKVD. During World War II, he fought in the Anders Army and Polish Armed Forces in the West.

== Career timeline ==
- 1931–1936: Commanding Officer 12th Ulan Regiment
- 1936–1939: Head of Army Historical Bureau
- 1939–1941: Prisoner of War, Soviet Union
- 1941–1942: General Officer Commanding 8th Division
- 1942: General Officer Commanding 5th Division
- 1942–1943: Chief of Staff Polish Forces in Soviet Union
- 1943–1944: General Officer Commanding 2nd Armoured Brigade
- 1944–1947: General Officer Commanding 2nd Armoured Division (2 Warszawska Dywizja Pancerna)

== Promotions ==
- Podporucznik (Second lieutenant) - November 1918
- Rotmistrz (Captain)- 1 June 1919
- Major (Major) - 15 August 1924
- Podpułkownik (Lieutenant colonel) - 1 January 1930
- Pułkownik (Colonel) - 1 January 1934
- Generał brygady (Brigadier general) - 11 December 1941

== Honours and awards ==
- Gold Cross of Virtuti Militari
- Silver Cross of Virtuti Militari
- Officer's Cross of the Order of Polonia Restituta
- Cross of Independence
- Cross of Valour (four times)
- Gold Cross of Merit with Swords
- Army Medal for War
- Gold Cross of Merit
- Commemorative Medal for the War of 1918–1921
- Medal of the 10th Anniversary of Regained Independence
- Monte Cassino Commemorative Cross
- Officer's Cross of the Legion of Honour
- Officer of the Order of the Crown of Romania
- Distinguished Service Order (United Kingdom)
- War Medal 1939–1945
- Defence Medal (United Kingdom)
- Italy Star
- Order of Saints Maurice and Lazarus (Italy)
