= Stanisław Szostak =

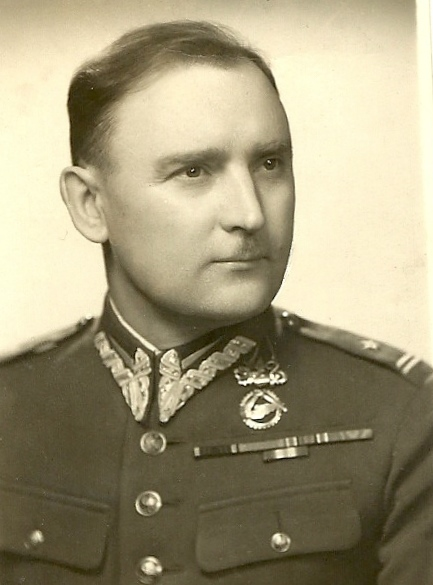
- Born: 14 January 1898; Berezyna
- Died: 11 February 1961 (aged 63); London
- Burial place: Brompton Cemetery, London
- Military career
- Allegiance: Second Polish Republic, Polish government-in-exile
- Branch: Armour
- Rank: Colonel
- Conflicts: World War I, World War II

Stanisław Szostak (14 January 1898 – 11 February 1961) was a colonel of the Polish Armoured Corps.

He was born in Byerazino, today's Belarus, the son of Władysław and Maria Nieciejowska of Hrynica. He was injured in a car accident and died in 1961. He is buried at Brompton Cemetery in London.

== Russian Revolution ==
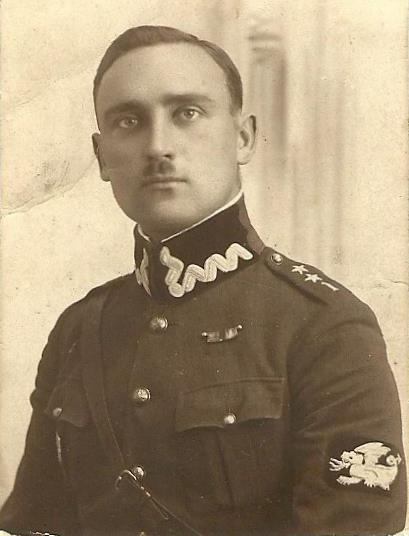
Stanisław Szostak as a Lieutenant

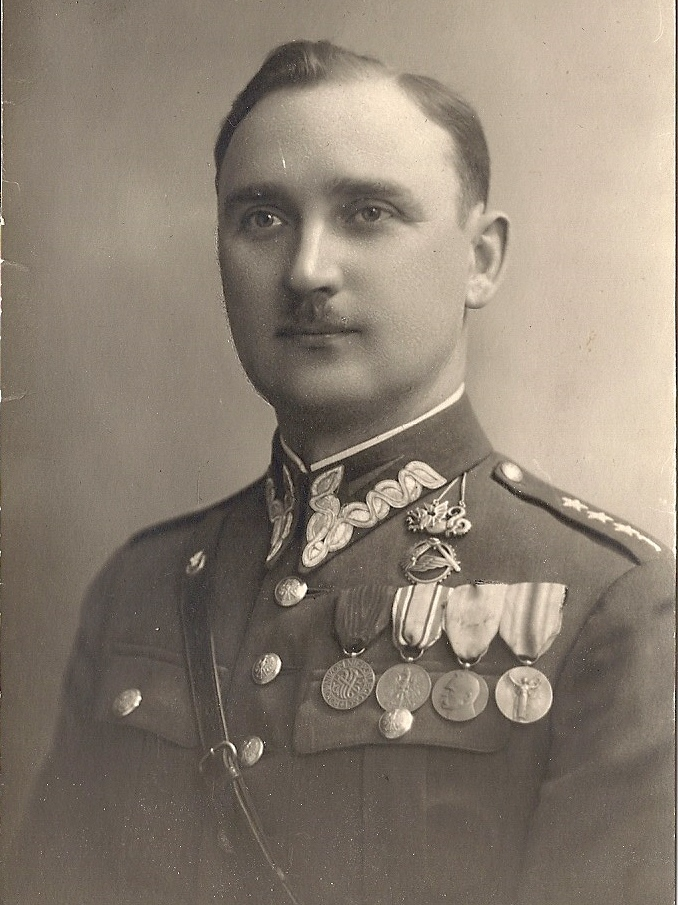
Stanisław Szostak as a Captain

In 1917, having graduated with distinction (Gold Medal), Stanisław Szostak was enrolled as an officer cadet (junker) in the Nikolayevskoye School of Engineers in Petrograd, Russia.

Following the unsuccessful counter-revolutionary Junker mutiny of 29 October 1917 he was imprisoned in the Peter and Paul Fortress in Petrograd. On 18 December 1917, after his release was negotiated by the Polish Military Committee in Petrograd, Stanisław Szostak joined the Junkers company of the 1st Knights Legion of the 1st Polish Corps. Later, he served with the Officer Cadet Legion within the 1st Corps until 6 June 1918. At the beginning of his tour of service, in January 1918 he took part in the Battle of Bobruysk (1918) and the capture of the Babruysk fortress, which was occupied by the Bolshevik forces.

== Polish–Soviet War ==
After the dissolution of the 1st Corps was admitted to study at the Politechnika Warzawska. He, nonetheless, chose to interrupt the studies on 18 December 1918, volunteering to serve with the Bialystok Rifle Regiment of the 1st Lithuanian–Belarusian Division commanded by General Jan Rządkowski – first as a private he commanding a section, subsequently as a corporal in charge of a platoon. During the Polish–Soviet War (1919–20), he fought on the Lithuanian–Belarusian Front in the regimental technical support company and remained with the regiment until 20 May 1920.

== Interwar Poland ==
From 25 May to 18 August 1920, he was an officer cadet at Infantry Officers School in Warsaw. After completing the course he was assigned to serve with the reserve battalion of the 56th Greater Poland Infantry Regiment as a platoon commander. On 15 December 1920, Stanislaw Szostak was promoted to the rank of a second lieutenant. On 3 May 1922, he was verified as a lieutenant with seniority from 1 June 1919 in the corps of Infantry Officers. In June of that year he was appointed to be the adjutant of the 2nd Battalion of 56th Greater Poland Infantry Regiment.

Early in 1924 Lt Szostak joined the Central Tank School of the 1st Tank Regiment, which was equipped with French Renault FT tanks, and from August 1925 he commanded a platoon of the 7th Tank Company. From 1928 to 1931 he commanded 6th, 7th, and then 4th company of tanks. On 19 March 1928 he was promoted to the rank of a captain (seniority from 1 January 1928). From June 1931 to April 1938 he took up training responsibilities. First, from June 1931 to April 1934 he lectured at the Training Centre of Tanks and Armoured Cars in Warsaw. Then, in the years 1935 to 1938 he was the head of the Training Department at the headquarters of the Armoured Corps attached to the Ministry of Military Affairs in Warsaw.

On 19 March 1937 he was promoted to the rank of major of the Armour Corps. From April 1938 Major Szostak was a deputy commander of the 7th Armoured Battalion in Grodno. Shortly before the invasion of Poland by Germany, in August 1939 Major Szostak became the commander of the mobilised 32nd Reconnaissance Armoured Unit consisting of 3 squadrons with 13 TKS tankettes and 8 type 34-II armoured cars.

== World War II ==
=== September Campaign ===
After the outbreak of World War II in Europe, Major Szostak and the 32nd Reconnaissance Armoured Unit under his command took part in the battles of Grajewo and Szczuczyn. The unit covered the withdrawal of the Podlaska Cavalry Brigade. On September 12, he took part in the battle for Kita. By September 16, he lost all his armour but fought the invading Soviets at the battle of Grodno and organised defence of the town of Giby.

=== Interment in Lithuania ===
On September 24, with the remainder of his men Major Szostak crossed the Lithuanian border and was interned. Until July 1940 he was in the internment camps of Calvary, Kuršėnai and Fort V in Kaunas.

=== Polish Armed Forces in exile (WWII) ===
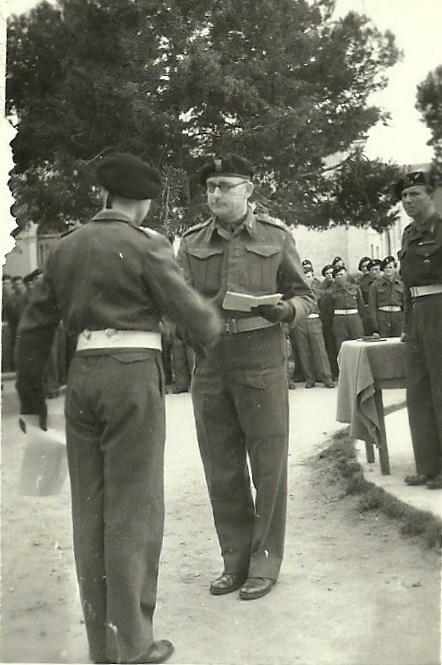
Stanisław Szostak in Italy, Officer Cadet (Armoured Cavalry) graduation. Gallipoli 1945

After the invasion of Lithuania by the Soviet Union he was transferred to Kozielsk II, and later to the camp in Griazowiec. He was released pursuant to the signature to the Sikorski–Mayski agreement of 30 July.

On August 25, Major Szostak joined the so-called Anders' Army, a Polish corps that was being organised in the Soviet Union. On 7 September 1941, he was appointed to be a commanding officer of the 5th Tank Battalion of the 5th Wilno Infantry Division. He was given the command of the Polish Armoured Forces in the Soviet Union on 20 September and remained in this post until the evacuation to Iran on 28 March 1942. Until 23 January 1942, Major Szostak was also in charge of the Army Transport Service. From 3 April to 14 May, he was in charge of the Armoured Forces and Transport Service on the staff of Gen. Mieczysław Boruta-Spiechowicz (troops evacuated to Iran.) On 15 May he moved from Tehran to Palestine, where on 1 June he arrived at the Polish Army camp in Gedera. Here he became a deputy commander of a tank battalion at the Organisation Centre of the Tank Forces of the Polish Army in the Middle East. In August he commanded the 4th Tank Battalion. From November 1942, Major Szostak was put in charge of the Tank Training Centre and then Training Centre for Transport and Armoured Units. He was promoted to the rank of lieutenant colonel from 3 May 1943. From April 1944, he commanded the Reserve Armoured Troops Centre of the 2nd Polish Corps.

Colonel Zebrowski on page 491 of his monograph writes:

Major Szostak was responsible for the entire training of the armoured troops of the 2nd Polish Corps. Because of his knowledge and effort the armoured units reached a high level of competence. He was the author of all the training manuals, training programs for officers, officer cadets, non commissioned officers, and technically qualified soldiers. All the tank battalions and later armoured regiments followed these instructions.

From 15 September 1944 Lt Col. Szostak commanded the 7th Armoured Regiment. From January 1945 to January 1946 he was commander of the Armoured Forces Training Centre, then the Inspector of Motor Transport Training of the Base of the 2nd Corps.

== After World War II ==
In summer of 1946 Lt Col. Szostak came to Britain. In May 1947 he joined the Polish Resettlement Corps. During the two-year contract he was in command of Foxley I, and then Barons Cross camp near Leominster. After his release from the army, he settled with his family in London. In 1954 he remained faithful to President Zaleski, of the Polish government-in-exile. He was a member of the Polish Combatants Association, and Circle No 120 (2nd Corps Headquarters).

== Promotions ==
- 2nd Lieutenant – 15 December 1920
- Lieutenant – 3 May 1922 seniority from 1 June 1919
- Captain – 19 March 1928 seniority from 1 January 1928
- Major – 19 March 1937
- Lieutenant Colonel – 3 May 1943
- Colonel – 19 March 1961 seniority January 1961

== Decorations ==
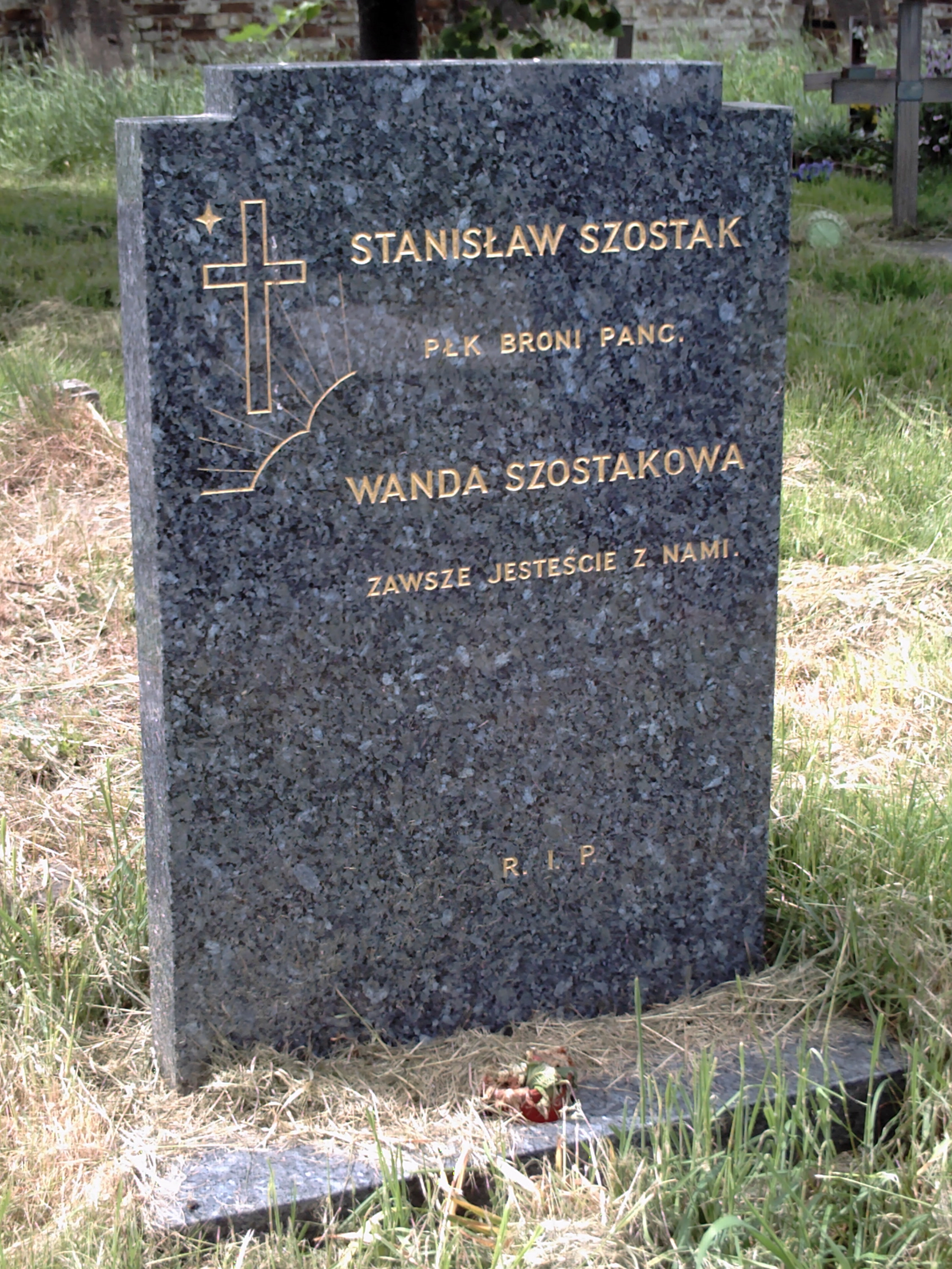
Grave of Stanisław Szostak in London

Polish

- Gold Cross of Merit with Swords
- Gold Cross of Merit
- Silver Cross of Merit
- Medal of Independence
- Army Medal (twice)

British

- 1939–1945 Star
- Africa Star
- Italy Star
- Defence Medal
- War Medal 1939–1945

French

- 1914–1918 Inter-Allied Victory medal

== Bibliography ==
- A. Suchcitz, M. Wroński: Barwa Pułku 7 Pancernego- zarys monograficzny.Wydawnictwo Instytutu Tarnogórskiego. Tarnowskie Góry 2002
- Zbigniew Lalak: Broń pancerna w PSZ 1939–1945. Pegaz-Bis: O.K. Media Warsawa 2004 ISBN 83-922002-0-9
- Marian Żebrowski – "Zarys historii polskiej broni pancernej 1918–1947". Zarząd Zrzeszenia Kół Oddz .Broni Pancernej. Londyn 1971
