= 2nd Armoured Brigade (Poland) =

2nd Warszawski Armoured Brigade
- Emblem of the Polish 2nd Warszawski Armoured Division.
- Active: 1942–1947
- Country: Poland
- Branch: Polish Land Forces
- Type: Armoured
- Size: Brigade
- Equipment: Sherman tank

The 2nd (Warsaw) Armoured Brigade (Polish: 2 Warszawska Brygada Pancerna) was an armoured brigade of the Polish Armed Forces in the West during World War II that existed from 1942 to 1945. From 1945 to 1947 it was redesignated as the 2nd Warsaw Armoured Division. The unit was the armoured wing of the 2nd (Polish) Corps. The state of the brigade in the Italian campaign was: 222 officers and 3362 other ranks. There were 160 medium tanks, 33 light tanks and 13 special tanks.

== Headquarters ==
General officer commanding: Brig. General Gustaw Paszkiewicz then Brig. General Bronisław Rakowski.

Following the upgrade to Division, Rakowski became GOC 2nd Warsaw Armoured Division. Colonel Ziemowit Grabowski became CO 2 Armoured Brigade.

== 1945 Upgrade to Division ==
In 1945 the brigade was upgraded to Division strength and it stood as follows:

- Polish 2nd Warsaw Armoured Division. CO: Brig. Gen. Bronisław Rakowski
  - Carpathian Uhlan/Lancer Regiment (Divisional Recce)
  - 2nd Warsaw Armoured Brigade
    - 4th 'Scorpion' Armoured Regiment
    - 1st Krechowiecki Uhlan Regiment
    - 6th 'Children of Lwów' Armoured Regiment
    - 2nd Motorised Independent Polish Commando Company
  - 16th Pomorska Infantry Brigade
    - 64th Pomorski Infantry Battalion
    - 66th Pomorski Infantry Battalion
    - 68th Pomorski Infantry Battalion
      - 16th Pomorski Support Company
  - Other Divisional Units
    - HQ Division Artillery
    - 7th Horse Artillery Regiment
    - 16th Pomorski Light Artillery Regiment
    - 2nd Anti-tank Regiment
    - 2nd Light Anti-aircraft Regiment
    - 2nd Warszawski Signals Battalion
    - 2nd Warszawski Engineer Battalion
      - 9th Forward Tank Replacement Squadron
      - 9th Supply Company
      - 19th Supply Company
      - 28th Supply Company
      - 9th Workshop Company
      - 16th Workshop Company
      - 2nd Armoured Division Military Police (Provost) Company
        - 9th Field Court
        - 343 Anti-malaria Section

== Operations ==
=== Monte Cassino ===
The first battle fought by the soldiers of the 2nd Independent Armored Brigade was the battle for Monte Cassino. The brigade, however, did not take part in the fighting as a whole in a separate section, but was divided. The 6th Armored Regiment "Children of Lwow” served as artillery, shelling the enemy's position from a safe distance. The 4th Armored Regiment "Scorpions" was to strike between the 5th KDP and the 3rd DSK through the "Gorge" on the monastery from the side of the valley. The offensive launched on May 17 was stopped as a result of a road mined and resumed only the next day. Due to an incline that was too steep, the tanks' attack was stopped, and from that moment on they played the role of artillery. Massa Albanetta was conquered by 3 DSK. The third member of the brigade who took part in the battles for Monte Cassino was the 12th Cavalry Regiment, which attacked the Benedictine Monastery.It was the 12th Uhlan Regiment that captured the ruins on the evening of May 18 during a patrol. After capturing the fortifications of the Gustav Line on May 19, the "BOB" group was formed under the command of Col. Bobiński. This formation included tanks from the 6th Armored Regiment "Children of Lwow”. This group was tasked with breaking the Hitler Line and taking Piedimonte. However, Col. Babinski made a mistake, because he sent these 16 tanks under the command of Lt. Col. Świetlicki without examining the area and the enemy forces. The group encountered strong resistance from the Germans and fought without the support of artillery and infantry, which had not yet managed to leave the hills. The fire support of the artillery came very late, but it was not the fault of the artillerymen. Until May 23, when Piedimonte was finally captured, only 1 of the 16 tanks sent had survived. After this event, Col. Bobiński was dismissed.

=== Ancona ===
The capture of Ancona was the second major battle of the 2nd Armored Brigade. While the 3rd DSK tied the enemy from the front, the 6th Lwow Infantry Brigade and the 2nd Infantry Brigade made a strike through the Monte Torto massif against the city of Polverigi. Then the grouping is separated and 2 Banc. attacks the city of Chiaravalle, thus cutting off the path of some of the retreating German troops. After winning fights, they moved towards Ancona, where they entered on July 18. When the Poles entered the city, the Germans ended their evacuation by sea. The brigade opened fire on the reflecting ships, sinking 3 of them.

=== Bologna ===
During the Battle of Bologna in April 1945. The 2 Armoured Brigade fought as the easternmost unit. The attack began on April 9. The brigade exited through position 3 of the DSK. They stopped at the Sillaro River, where they fought against the German 1 KSpad. After the unit broke through the defenses, it continued to advance across the Ganiana and Quaderna Rivers, then merged with 3 DSK. Together with them, the tanks entered the city on April 21, 1945.

== Tank names and markings ==
A Sherman Tank of the 1st Squadron, Krechowiecki Lancers Regiment

Tanks in the 2nd Armoured Brigade (and later Division) were all named, the names being painted in the squadron colours. The turret also had a diamond, triangle, square or circle painted to show squadron number.

- Stencilled versions of the regimental badges featured on the tank turrets; either separately or inside the squadron signs: a scorpion for the 4th Regiment, a lion for the 6th Regiment and two palm trees and a crescent moon for the Carpathian Lancers. The exception to this were the Krechowiecki Lancers who used a horse head symbol.
- Some of the name were replicated and the version was indicated by a Roman numeral so, for example, there was a Rekord I, Rekord II and a Rekord III.

2nd Armoured Brigade HQ Platoon
Tank names: Quizil-Ribat Hill-69 Quassasin Rossario MTE-Cassino Taza-Khurmatli

4th “Scorpion” Armoured Regiment
HQ Squadron
Il-Vicinato Monte-Cassino Gustaw Gdynia Gdansk Grochow Gardziel Gryf Gron Grodna

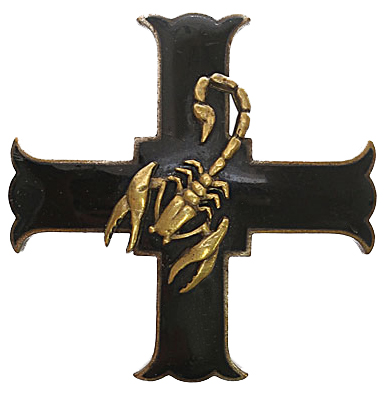
Breast badge of the 4th ‘Skorpion’ Armoured Regiment

1st Squadron
Mass Albaneta Tobruk Taifun Turnia Trzyniec Tempo Tygrys Taran Tur Terror Tempo Ter Topor Tuchola Tyran Tranto Tapir Taras Tarzan Tomahawk Torun Turon Tczew Toniek Taranto Tyran

2nd Squadron
Poganin Pirat Powab Pawian Piesc Pigmej Pazur Piorun Przeboj Pantera Perkun Parada Perla Pomsta Puma Piesc Paluszek Paluch Pajac Pudel Plomien Paf Puchacz Puhar Poleszuk Perkun Pat Plomien Portos Paz Pegaz Potwor Pif Pogon Phantom Ridge Potor

3rd Squadron
Szatan Sztorm Sirocco Sultan Szach Stryj Sanok Styr Smyk Sum Sajdak Salamandra Slon Smok Saracen Sarmata Satyr Sroka Sintria Sep Solec San

1st Krechowiecki Lancers Regiment
HQ Squadron

Krechowiak Koziatyn Komarow Krokodyl Korosten Krylow

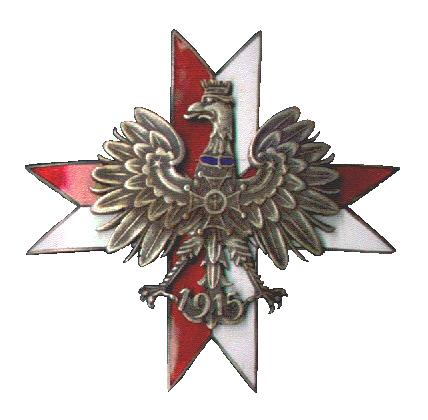
Badge of the 1st Krechowiecki Lancers

1st Squadron
Burza Bizon Brawura Brat Buzenko Bestja Bystry Bohun Brytan Bekas Blyskawica Bobr Bajka Buzdygan Basn Bawol Boa Bolko Boruta Bromka Brutal Busola Babinicz Ballada Baska Bat Beduin Birkut Biruta Bohdanka Bozenka Brzask Biruta Bor

2nd Squadron
Rozmach Rycerz Raider Rowne Renifer Rejtan Radom Rozbojnik Rys Rak Ryba Rekin Rey Rekord Raszyn Rebacz Rozeta Romek Raid Reymont Rumak

3rd Squadron
Zwyciezca Zboj Zadzior Zadlo Zemsta Znicz Zadymka Zawisza Zagloba Zyrafa Zamiec Zamosc Zbyk Zyw Zagonczyk Zerwikaptur Zryw Zubr Zuch Zwierz Zbik

6th “Children of Lwów” Armoured Regiment
HQ Squadron
Lwow Lech Lot Lucy

1st Squadron
Wola Wielki-walc Wicher Wilczur Wilk Westerplatte Wielun Wloczega Wladek Wacek

2nd Squadron
Jez Joasia Juno Jowisz Jontek Jarzabek Jadzia Jaguar Janosik Jaskolka Jaszczur Jastrzab

3rd Squadron
Mur Maczuga Msciciel Mars Morus Merkury Magnat Majcher Miecz Mikrus Mlot Mocarz Markiza

Carpathian Lancers Regiment

HQ Squadron

Tobruk Acroma Cassino

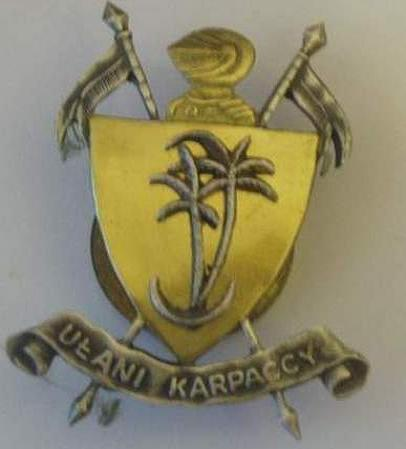
Badge of the Carpathian Lancers

1st Squadron
Grunwald Marsa-matruh Cairo Museirat

2nd Squadron
Grom Wir Potop Zamiec Huragan El-adem Hamsin Mex

3rd Squadron
Pomorzanin Kaniowczyk Krechowiak Rokitnianczyk Poznaniak
