= Child (surname) =

Child is a surname. Notable people with the surname include:

- Arthur Child (judge) (1852–1902), British judge at Trinidad and St Lucia
- Arthur Child (1910–1996), Canadian businessman
- Asa Child (1798–1858), American Attorney
- Calvin G. Child (1834–1880), Son of Asa Child and an American Attorney
- C. Judson Child Jr. (1923–2004), American Episcopal bishop
- Charles Manning Child (1869–1959), American zoologist
- Desmond Child (born 1953), American musician and songwriter
- Fay G. Child (1908–1965), American politician and newspaper editor
- Francis Child (disambiguation)
- Fred Child (born 1963), American radio host
- Harry W. Child (1857–1931), American entrepreneur
- James Martin Child (1893–1918), British WW1 flying ace
- Jane Child (born 1967), Canadian musician
- Jeremy Child (1944–2022), English actor
- Joan Child (1921–2013), Australian politician
- John Child (disambiguation)
- Jonathan Child (1785–1860), American mayor of Rochester, New York
- Josiah Child (1630–1699), English merchant, economist, and governor of the East India Company
- Julia Child (1912–2004), American cook and author
- Kirsty Child, Australian actress
- Lauren Child (born 1965), English illustrator and children's writer
- Lincoln Child (born 1957), American horror and thriller writer
- Lydia Maria Child (1802–1880), American abolitionist, women's rights activist, Indian rights activist, novelist and journalist
- Mollie Child (1908–1989), English cricketer
- Paul Child (disambiguation)
- Peter Child (born 1953), American composer and Professor of Music at Massachusetts Institute of Technology
- Phoebe Child (1910–1990), English pioneer of the Montessori Method
- Richard Child, 1st Earl Tylney (1680–1750), British diplomat
- Richard Washburn Child (1881–1935), American diplomat
- Robert Child (disambiguation)
- Samuel Child (1693–1752), English banker and Member of Parliament
- Simon Child (born 1988), New Zealand field hockey player
- Smith Child (disambiguation)
- Thomas Child Jr. (1818–1869), American politician
- Tim Child (born 1946), English television producer
- Victor Child (1897–1960), Canadian newspaper illustrator, painter and etcher
- William Child (disambiguation)

== See also ==
- Lee Child, pen name of English thriller writer Jim Grant (born 1954)
- Child Villiers, an aristocratic surname

== See also ==
- Childe (surname)
- Childs (disambiguation)
