= Childe (surname) =

Childe can be a surname. Notable people with the surname include:

- Elias Childe, English painter
- Henry Langdon Childe, English entertainer
- James Warren Childe, English painter
- Vere Gordon Childe, Australian philologist and archaeologist
- Wilfred Rowland Childe, British poet and critic

As a given name it may refer to:

- Childe Hassam
- Childe Harold Wills
- Childe, the codename of Tartaglia, a character in 2020 video game Genshin Impact

== See also ==
- Childe
- Child (surname)
- Childe the Hunter
