= Coles Child (disambiguation) =

Coles Child, usually known as Jeremy Child (1944–2022), was an English actor and baronet.

Coles Child may also refer to:

- Sir Coles Child, 1st Baronet (1862–1929) of the Child baronets
- Sir Coles John Child, 2nd Baronet (1906–1971) of the Child baronets
- Sir Coles John Alexander Child, 4th Baronet (b. 1982) of the Child baronets

== See also ==
- Child (surname)
