= Philip Bujak =

British educationalist (born 1960)

Philip Kay-Bujak
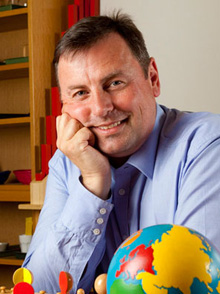
- Bujak as Director of Montessori 2011
- Born: Philip Edwin Bujak; 17 February 1960 (age 66); Norfolk, United Kingdom
- Education: University of East Anglia
- Occupations: Educationalist, Historian and author
- Years active: 1983–2016
- Awards: Pro Memoria Medal; The Order pro merito Melitensi (Cross); Honorary Freedom of the City of London; Liveryman of The Worshipful Company of Gardener's and the Guild of Educators

Philip Edwin Kay-Bujak (born 17 February 1960) is a British educationalist, former headmaster and author. As CEO of Montessori St Nicholas Charity he was responsible for the founding of the Montessori Schools Association, the Montessori Evaluation and Accreditation Board (designed to identify authentic Montessori schools and improve standards of teaching and management), and was the leading voice in the drive for the creation of state funded Montessori schools.

Having retired through ill health in 2016, in 2018, and having been acquitted of 11 of 13 offences, he was sentenced to six years in prison for defrauding the Montessori St Nicholas Charity of £180,000 whilst he was its chief executive officer. In 2020, he was released early from prison on appeal.

== Early life and teaching ==
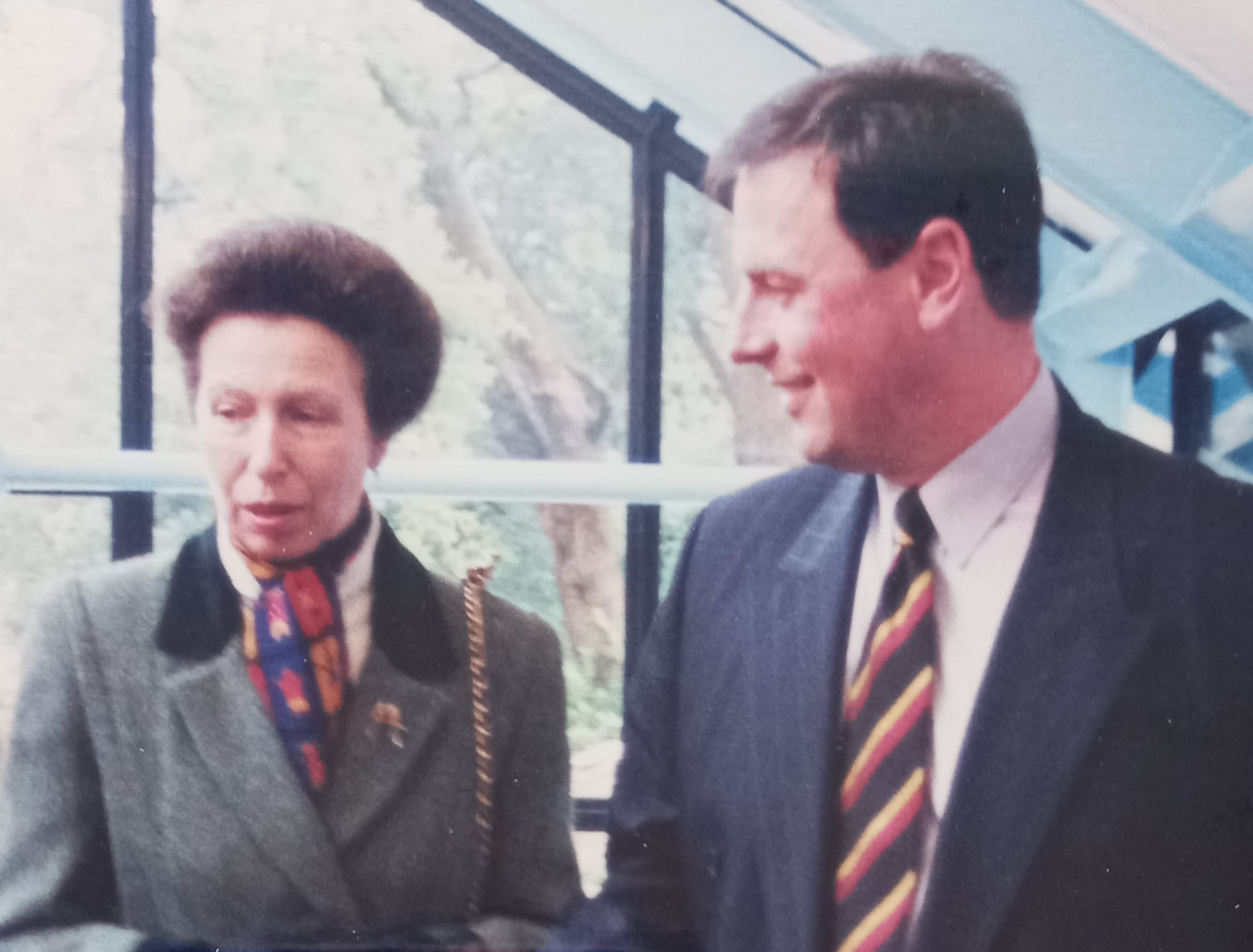
Opening of The Millennium Centre at Stover School 2000. Philip Bujak and HRH The Princess Royal.

Born in Attleborough, Norfolk, Bujak attended Attleborough High School. He read modern European history at the University of East Anglia, 1979–1982, and went on to teacher training at Keswick Hall, Norfolk.

He was head of history at Langley School, Loddon from 1983 to 1988, then head of lower and middle school and boarding housemaster from 1988 to 1993. From 1993 to 2003 he was headmaster of Stover School in Devon.

== Montessori ==
In 2003, Bujak was appointed Chief Executive of the Montessori St Nicholas Charity in London and became responsible for the largest aspect of the Montessori movement across the United Kingdom. In 2005, he founded The Montessori Schools Association, which now comprises approximately 700 Montessori schools; and, in collaboration with Manchester Local Authority, established the first ever state Montessori school at Gorton Mount Primary School. Bujak, speaking to The Guardian, said "I would love to do it for other schools." Between 2005 and 2009, Bujak ran annual residential leadership courses for prospective Headteachers at St Edmund's Hall, University of Oxford and was appointed to the Skills and Crafts Commission on reforming apprenticeships. In 2007 Bujak published Around the World in 100 Years, a celebration of the centenary of the Montessori movement and its worldwide appeal. In 2008, he established The Montessori Evaluation and Accreditation Board which was the only Montessori accreditation scheme in the UK, with 152 leading Montessori schools in membership. Bujak was a leading voice for the need to identify authentic Montessori teaching and to improve teaching standards.

In 2009, he was appointed managing director of Montessori Centre International. At that time MCI was in danger of collapse however Bujak expanded MCI into the largest Montessori training college in Europe. In 2012, Bujak led a successful Montessori bid to secure the first Department of Education contract for the Montessori movement with the Charity providing parenting classes funded by central government in Camden, London. In 2012, Bujak, championed the Montessori Manifesto 2012–2015, launched by Dame Andrea Leadsom at The House of Commons, which was a major national initiative funded by the St Nicholas Charity, to take the Montessori into the most challenged inner-city communities across the UK. In 2013, Bujak expanded the reach of the St Nicholas Charity into Poland with the opening of a new office in Warsaw and the launch of a new online course in Polish. This was the latest of a series of European initiatives sponsored by the St Nicholas Charity. Differences of opinion with Trustees and the new Chairman of Trustees caused Bujak to leave this post in 2014 suffering with heart failure.

== Charitable activities ==
In 2009, as a commitment to raising awareness of the contribution of the Polish community living in the UK, Bujak co-founded Polish Heritage with Andrew Meeson. Bujak was vice chairman of the Polish Heritage Society UK in 2009; he assisted in the repair and erection of a statue of Frederyk Chopin at the South Bank Centre (a gift from the people of Poland in the 1970s that had been allowed to fall into disrepair); and supported the placing of a plaque to commemorate the London home of Stanislaw Sosabowski in Chiswick.

In 2011, in recognition of his work in highlighting the contribution of members of the Polish community in the UK, during and after the Second World War, he was awarded the Pro Memoria Medal by the Republic of Poland. For his fundraising activities he was awarded the Order pro merito Melitensi (cross) by the Sovereign Military Order of Malta and in 2010 he was granted the Freedom of the City of London.

In 2012, Bujak oversaw the restoration of a portrait of Edward Rydz-Śmigły by the artist, Jan Hawrylkiewicz. This painting was the second of what was a commitment to restore two such artworks a year and followed the restoration of the Battle of Britain painting Return from a Successful Sortie by Artur Horowicz.

In 2013, Bujak led the initiative to place another plaque at 51 New Cavendish Street to mark the London headquarters of the Polish Navy during 1939–1945, unveiled in November 2013 by Witold Sobkow, the Polish Ambassador.

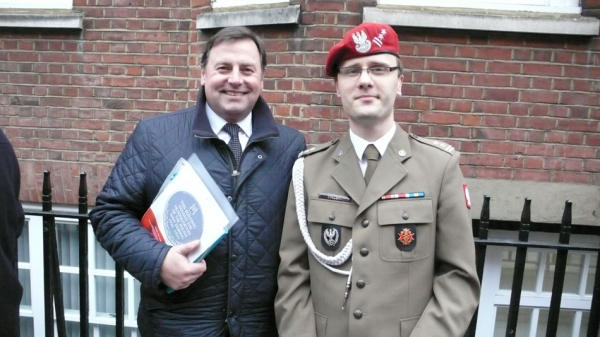
Philip Bujak with the military attache for The Republic of Poland at the unveiling of the Polish Naval plaque in 2013

In 2016, a memorial was commissioned by Philip Bujak and his brother and was dedicated to the men of the 3rd Carpathian Division. Over 450 men, including his father, were based at Riddlesworth Resettlement Camp in 1946, and the memorial was unveiled by The Ambassador of The Republic of Poland, Mr Witold Sobkow. The inscription reads:

AFTER THE SECOND WORLD WAR
POLISH SOLDIERS OF THE 3rd. CARPATHIAN DIVISION
ARRIVED AT RIDDLESWORTH CAMP FROM ITALY
AND LIVED HERE WITH THEIR FAMILIES.
POLAND WAS NOT FREE FOR THEM TO RETURN TO.
THERE ARE STILL MANY POLISH FAMILIES IN THE AREA.
THE DIVISION FOUGHT IN NORTH AFRICA
AND AT MONTE CASSINO, ANCONA AND BOLOGNA.

"It is easy to die for Poland but much harder to suffer for her" "Jest łatwo stracić życie za Polskę, trudniej za nią cierpieć"

In memory of his father, Bujak set up the J.F. Bujak Trust, to support sixth form students at his old comprehensive school who needed funding to undertake education-based travel around the world.

== Publications ==
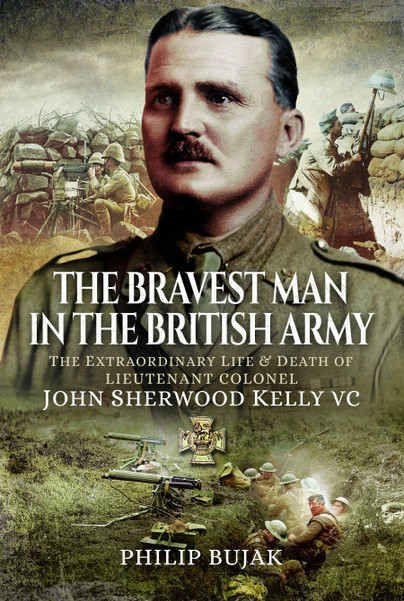
Published 2018

As writer and biographer, Kay-Bujak has published eleven books and has a history blog. In 1988 Bujak contributed to Norfolk & Suffolk in The Great War edited by Gerald Gliddon. In 1990, his history of his hometown Attleborough – The Evolution of a Town was published by Poppyland Press. The Bravest Man in the British Army, published by Pen and Sword Books, appeared in 2018 and added to his earlier work on the same subject, Undefeated: The Extraordinary Life and Death of Lt. Col. Jack Sherwood-Kelly VC, DSO, CMG which was published in 2008. In 2007 Around the World in 100 Years, which was a celebration of the centenary of Montessori, was published by the St. Nicholas Charity. In March 2023 My Heart is in the Highlands was published by Forster Books on the life and work of Scottish landscape artist Archibald Kay RSA RSW. The Life of Cicero - Lessons for Today from the Greatest Orator of The Roman Republic was published in October 2023. In May 2024 Empire Javelin, D-Day Assault Ship was published and charts the creation of a landing ship and the men of the American 116th Infantry who landed from her decks on 6 June 1944. In October 2024 Gallia Narbonensis was published detailing the Roman occupation and governance of southern France. In September 2025 a revisionist biography was published by Pen & Sword Books titled Hermann Balck: Hitler's Forgotten General. A biography of actress and model Madeline Smith was published by White Owl in June 2026 and the biography of German Generaloberst Erich Hoepner, was published by Pen & Sword in 2026.

Prior to 2018, Bujak wrote, and contributed to, several articles published in The Daily Telegraph, The Independent, The Guardian, Evening Standard, and other publications. He is also a commentator on Anglo-Polish relations and history of the Polish people in the UK. He was a regular contributor to Res Publica and Visegrad Insight – two academic journals published from Warsaw.

In 2019, Philip Bujak won the best newcomer prize in the journalistic section of the Koestler Awards.

== Books ==
- Attleborough: The Evolution of a Town, published 1990, ISBN 978-0-946148-45-5
- Around The World in 100 Years: The Montessori Centenary Book, published by the Montessori St Nicholas Charity, 2007
- Undefeated, published 2008, ISBN 978-0-9551902-2-3
- My Heart is in The Highlands: The Life of Scottish artist Archibald Kay RSA, published 2018, ISBN 978-0-9926907-2-4
- The Bravest Man in the British Army: The Extraordinary Life and Death of Lieutenant Colonel John Sherwood Kelly VC, published 2018, ISBN 978-1-4738-9576-8
- The Life of Cicero: Lessons For Today From The Greatest Orator of The Roman Republic, published 2023, ISBN 978-1-3990-9741-3
- Empire Javelin D-Day Assault Ship: The Royal Navy Vessel That Landed the US 116th Infantry on Omaha Beach, published 2024, ISBN 978-1-3990-3581-1
- The Roman Province of Gallia Narbonensis: The Occupation and Governance of Southern France 118 BCE to 235 CE, published 2024, ISBN 978-1-3990-3230-8
- Hermann Black: Hitler's Forgotten General, published 2025, ISBN 978-1-0361-1848-8
- Madeline Smith: Bond Girl: From 60's Fashion Model to Half a Century on Stage and Screen, published 2026, ISBN 978-1-0361-4866-9
- Generaloberst Erich Hoepner: Panzer Commander and Anti-Hitler Plotter, published 2026, ISBN 978-1-0361-3301-6

== Father ==
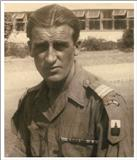
Jan Felix Bujak Serving with 3rd Carpathian Division, 2nd Corps of the Polish Army 1944

His father, Jan Felix Bujak was born in Sytno, Pomorske in northern Poland in 1919. He escaped from Nazi occupied Europe and joined the Free Polish Army in Italy, serving with the 3rd Heavy Machine Gun Battalion, 3rd Carpathian Division, 2nd Corps, at the battle of Monte Cassino. He was awarded the Krzyż Walecznych (Cross of Valour) and the Monte Cassino Cross. His father also fought in the battles for Ancona and Bologna in 1944 - 1945 and his battalion was credited with the taking of Monte della Crescia in July 1944. He was also the regimental chess champion and spoke five languages.

== Personal life ==
Bujak is a former Liveryman of the Worshipful Company of Gardeners and a former Freeman of the Worshipful Company of Educators.

Bujak lodged a personal injury claim against the Trustees of The Montessori St Nicholas Charity in 2015. This eventually collapsed as a result of counter claims by the trustees of the St Nicholas Charity and, after three contentious trials lasting 15 weeks over 18 months (the first having collapsed due to the unexpected and tragic death of his co-defendant Andrew Penny in a car accident the day prior to the start of their defence testimony), in July 2018 Bujak was given a six-year sentence by a judge at Southwark Crown Court, having been found guilty of fraud. He was later released early on appeal in September 2020.
