= 3rd Carpathian Rifle Division =

3 Dywizja Strzelców Karpackich
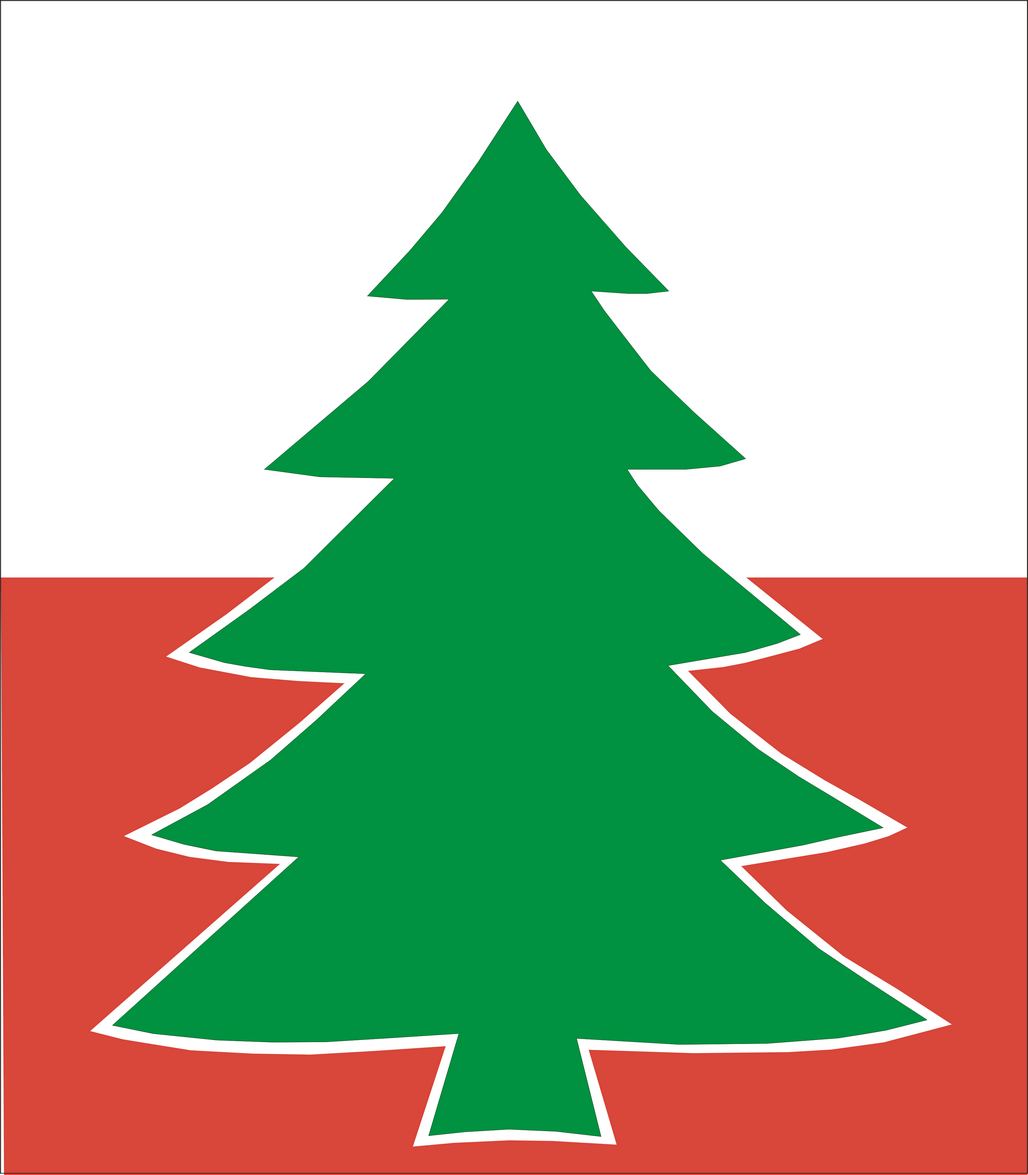
- Emblem of the division worn as a shoulder patch and painted on vehicles
- Active: 1942–1947
- Country: Poland
- Branch: Land forces
- Type: Infantry
- Role: Mountain warfare
- Nickname: Christmas Tree Division
- Engagements: Tobruk, Alem Hamza, Bardia, Monte Cassino, Gothic Line, Ancona, Bologna

Commanders
- Notable commanders: Stanisław Kopański, Bronisław Duch

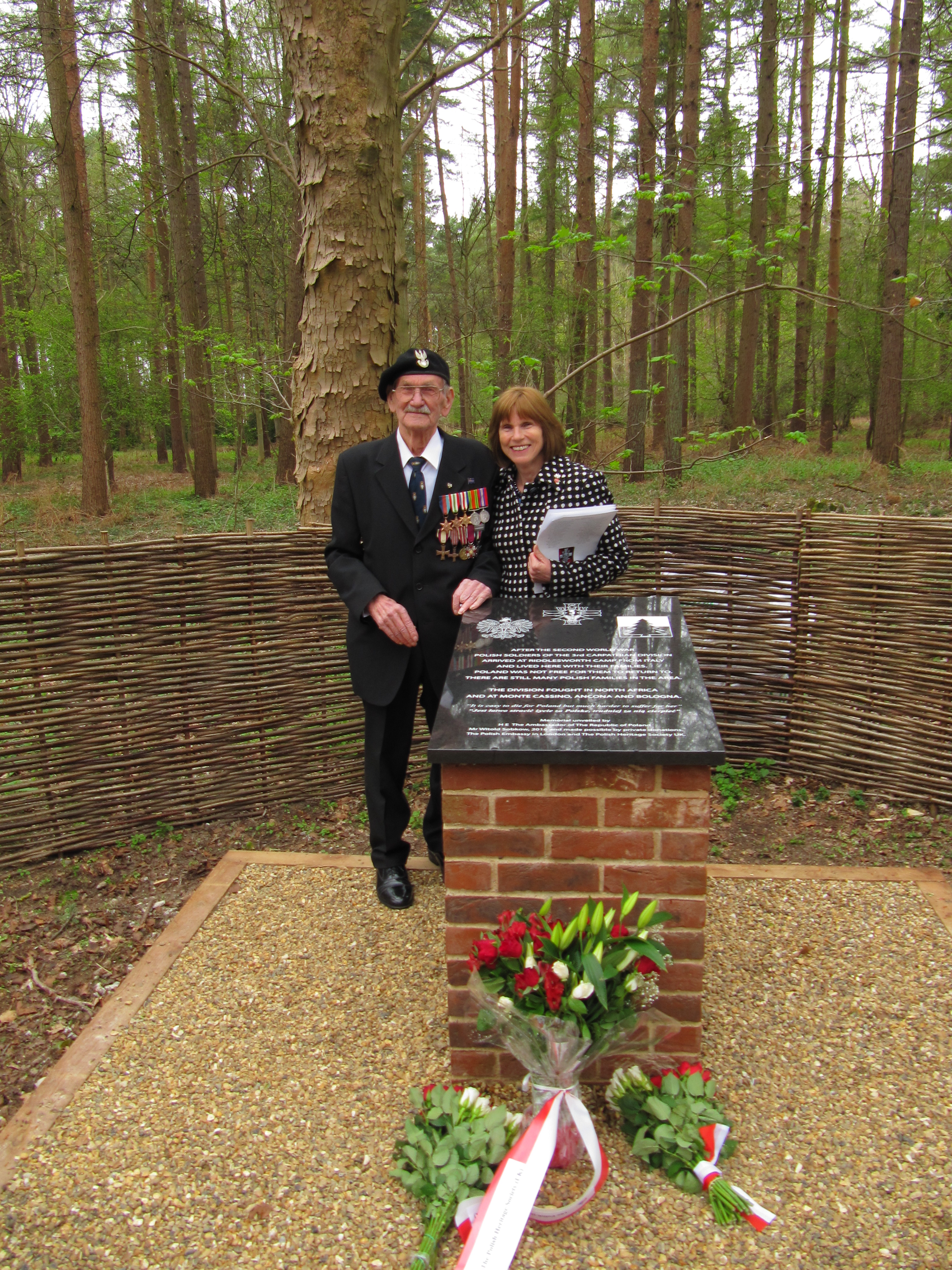
Mr Alfred Zelke, the last surviving member of the 3rd DSK camp at Riddlesworth, Norfolk, for the unveiling of the memorial, and his daughter Anna in 2018.

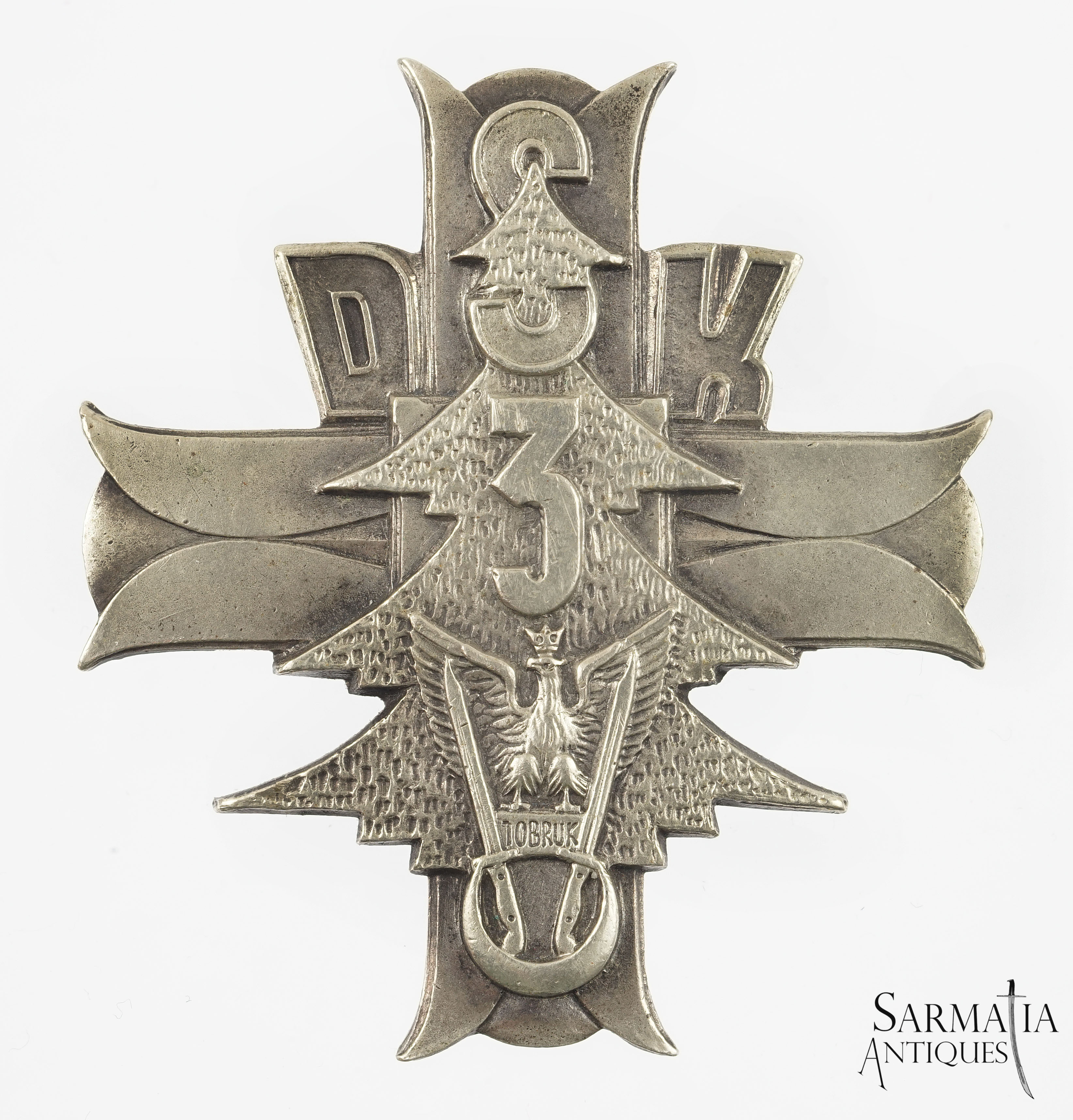
This Divisional badge is called Znak Pamiatkow and was instituted for soldiers of the 3rd DSK in 1 December 1945 and distributed in 1946 to troops who had fought with the Division.

The 3rd Carpathian Rifle Division (Polish: 3 Dywizja Strzelców Karpackich, sometimes translated as 3rd Carpathian Infantry Division), also commonly known as Christmas Tree Division due to the characteristic emblem of a cedar of Lebanon superimposed upon the Polish flag, was an infantry division of the Polish Armed Forces in the West that fought during World War II on the Italian Front. It was formed in 1942 of the Polish Independent Carpathian Brigade and of forces of Lieutenant General Władysław Anders' Polish 2nd Corps evacuated from the Soviet Union.

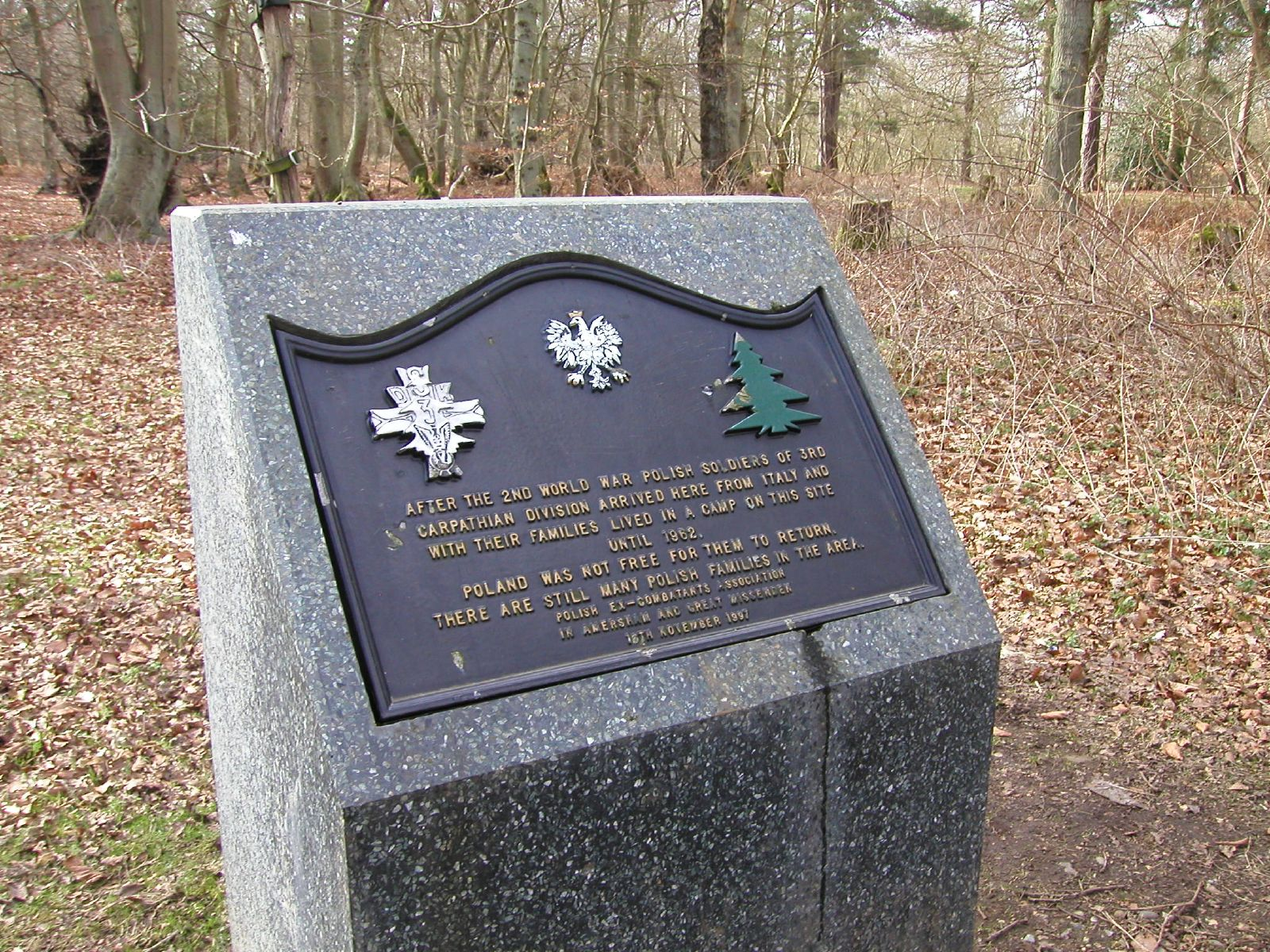
Plaque at the site of the former Polish camp, Hodgemoor Woods, Buckinghamshire.

The division participated in the North African and the Italian Campaigns (1941–1945) as part of the British Eighth Army. The division fought in some of the most difficult battles during the Italian campaigns of 1943-1944 and distinguished itself in numerous actions most notably the Battle of Monte Cassino, the dash for Ancona and Bologna.

== The Immediate Post War Period ==
After the cessation of hostilities in May 1945, the men and women of the Polish Armed forces were stationed across Europe. The 3rd Carpathian Division ended the war in Northern Italy and remained there for the next few months while their future was discussed in Moscow, London and Washington. The Divisional officers and troops naturally expected and hoped to return home to Poland however an ominous sign came in July 1945 when the British government withdrew formal recognition of The Polish Government in Exile - based in London as they had been since 1939. This was a portent of things to come and, soon after, the British government recognised the Russian backed government recently installed in Poland and the fate of the Polish nation was sealed. To add insult to injury and, after significant pressure from Stalin, Polish forces were refused permission to participate in the Victory Parade in London held on 8 June 1946 - an insult never forgotten by the men, women and families of the Polish forces. Yalta had already seen considerable swathes of Polish lands ceded to Russia by Churchill, but the British government also had to untangle the problem of what to do with the thousands of Poles already in Great Britain and also the fully armed Divisions in the now West Germany and Italy. In total over 220,000 Poles remained under British command. Should they be forcibly repatriated, it was clear that Stalin and his NKVD would execute many and send even more to Siberia in order to prevent the reformation of opposition to Communist rule in Poland. Members of the 3rd Carpathian Division hoped that a Third World War would result in which case they would return to Poland to fight the Russian occupiers.

According to the Polish Exiles of World War Two website and recent research, the 3rd Carpathian Division is listed as having 27,135 on roll in 1946 and of these 3,386 are also listed as having returned home to Poland after the war with the remaining men and women deciding to start new lives outside their homeland.

== The Polish Resettlement Corps (PRC) ==
Once it became clear that Poland had lost its independence, members of the Polish armed forces began to either return to Communist Poland or stay with their units. The formation of the Polish Resettlement Corps was announced by the Foreign Secretary Ernest Bevin in May 1946 and was a strategy to allow those Poles, who had made the heart rending decision not to return to their families, to transfer to Great Britain to start a new life. 110,000 joined the new Corps - mostly members of Polish II Corps - and, having been disarmed, a mass transportation from Italy to Great Britain began using dozens of troop transport ships. The remaining officers, men and women of the 3rd Carpathian Division were divided up into the 160 resettlement camps opened across the United Kingdom. The Corps was commanded by Polish General Stanislaw Kopanski - the former commander of the 3rd Carpathian Division in 1943.

== The Polish Resettlement Act & The Resettlement of the Division ==
The new Labour government went on to pass the 1947 Polish Resettlement Act which established in law the right of serving members of all Polish forces to stay and become British citizens. The Polish Resettlement Camps become 160 mini Polish nations. Polish schools were established to teach English to adults and children alike, Sports were arranged, Polish cultural life celebrated, gardens were planted and facilities repaired. The advance parties arrived in the autumn of 1946 and during early 1947 the main elements of the division arrived at Brandon Station, Brandon, Suffolk for transportation to their camps. The 3rd Carpathian Division was distributed between numerous camps such as Riddlesworth in Norfolk which became home to 3rd Heavy Machine Gun Bn (3rd Karp. CKM), Hodgemoor Camp in Berkshire (Kw.Gl 3rd DSK), Woodlands Park Camp, Great Missenden, Buckinghamshire which became the new home of a sapper battalion from the 3rd Carpathian Division, and London Road Camp in Brandon which was also home to another engineer battalion from the division. On arrival, the camps were a mixture of well maintained and almost derelict having been used for British and American troops during the war and even German prisoner of war camps.

In recent years a great deal of archival research has been completed and a book published by Zosia Bigus on the entire list of Polish Resettlement Camps.

== Memorials to the Division ==
In Italy and close to Monte Cassino, 1,300 meters north east of the Polish Cemetery, is the 3rd Carpathian Division memorial. Situated on Hill 593, this high obelisk is made of Travertine and is dedicated to the 1,115 men of the 3rd DSK who were killed in the Italian campaign. It has recently been fully restored. In the UK, local groups or the families of Polish troops once based there have now erected memorials recording the people who arrived there after World War Two, their sacrifice and dedication to their homeland and to the country that gave them a new home. Examples can be found at Hodgemoor in Buckinghamshire, as well as the Brandon and Riddlesworth Camps in Norfolk. The challenges for this first generation of Polish people of adjusting to post war life in a new country and a new language were considerable, but many of the Polish families or families with roots to a Polish name can trace their origins back to these events and to this division in 1946 and 1947.

== Commanders ==
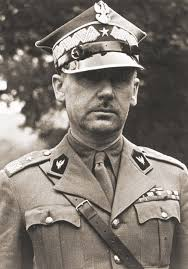
- Gen Stanislaw Kopanski
  Stanisław Kopański (1943)
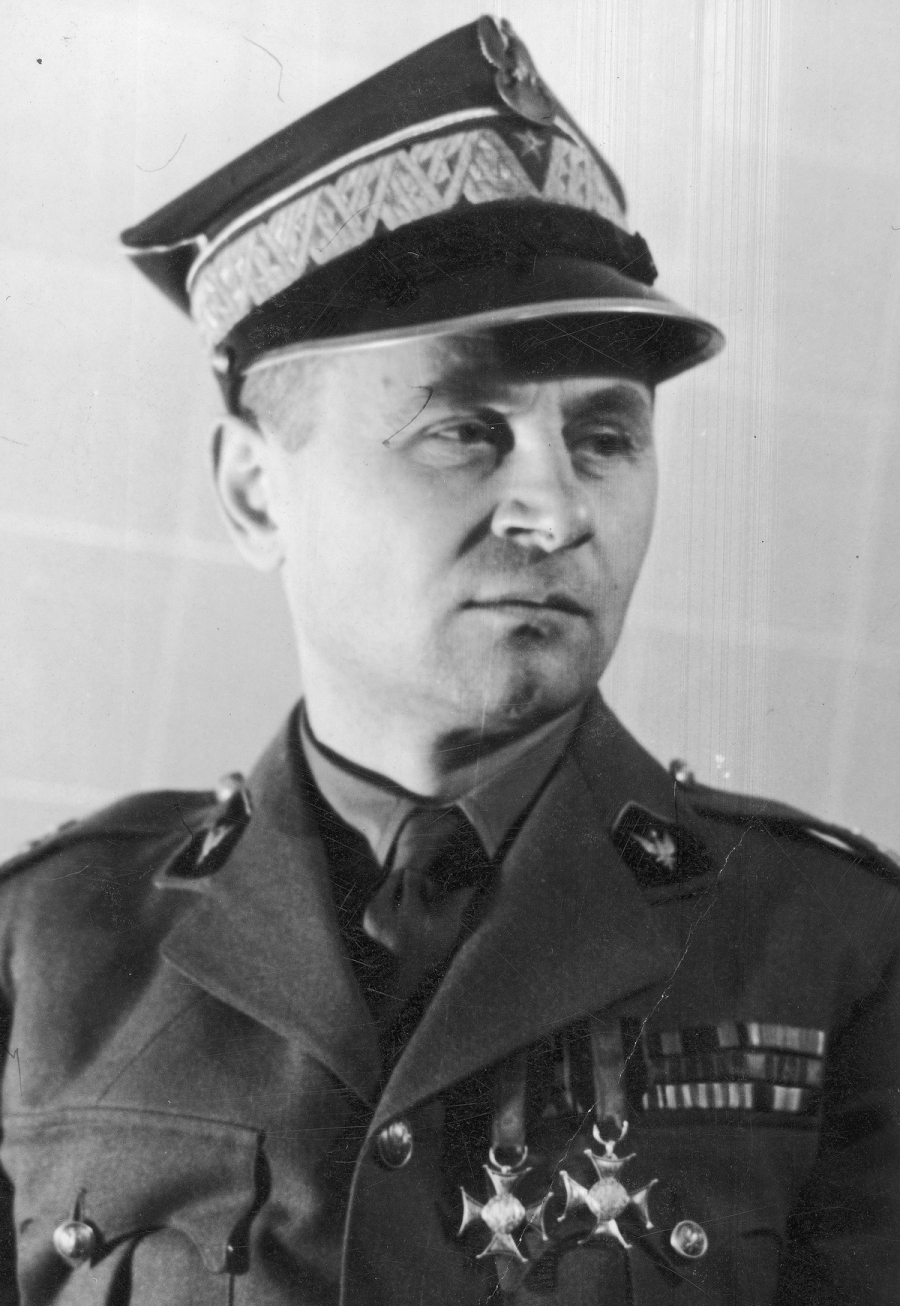
- Gen Bronislaw Duch
  Bronisław Duch (1944–1945)

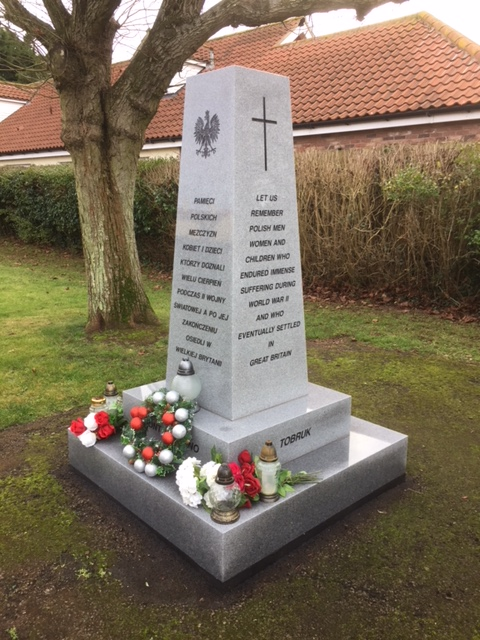
Memorial to the 3rd DSK at Brandon in Norfolk.

== Order of battle ==
The division's order of battle between 1943 and 1946 was as follows:

3rd Carpathian Rifle Division
Brigade	Sub-units	Notes
1st Carpathian Rifle Brigade 1 Brygada Strzelców Karpackich Peszek	1st Rifle Battalion
2nd Rifle Battalion
3rd Rifle Battalion
2nd Carpathian Rifle Brigade 2 Brygada Strzelców Karpackich Szymański	4th Rifle Battalion
5th Rifle Battalion
6th Rifle Battalion
3rd Carpathian Rifle Brigade 3 Brygada Strzelców Karpackich (since 1945)	7th Rifle Battalion
8th Rifle Battalion
9th Rifle Battalion
Reconnaissance Units (one of the following)	3rd Carpathian Cavalry Regiment
12th Podolian Cavalry Regiment
7th Lublin Cavalry Regiment
Artillery units artyleria dywizyjna	1st Carpathian Field Artillery Regiment
2nd Carpathian Field Artillery Regiment
3rd Carpathian Field Artillery Regiment
3rd Carpathian Anti-tank Artillery Regiment
3rd Carpathian Light Anti-aircraft Artillery Regiment
Support Units	3rd Carpathian Medium Machinegun Battalion
3rd Carpathian Engineers Battalion
3rd Carpathian Signals Battalion
Rear Units jednostki tyłowe	military police, court martial, military hospital, front hospitals, logistics units, transport battalions and such

== See also ==
- Polish contribution to World War II
- Riddlesworth
- Philip Bujak
