= Battle of Bologna =

Component of World War 2

- Part of the Spring 1945 offensive in Italy during World War II
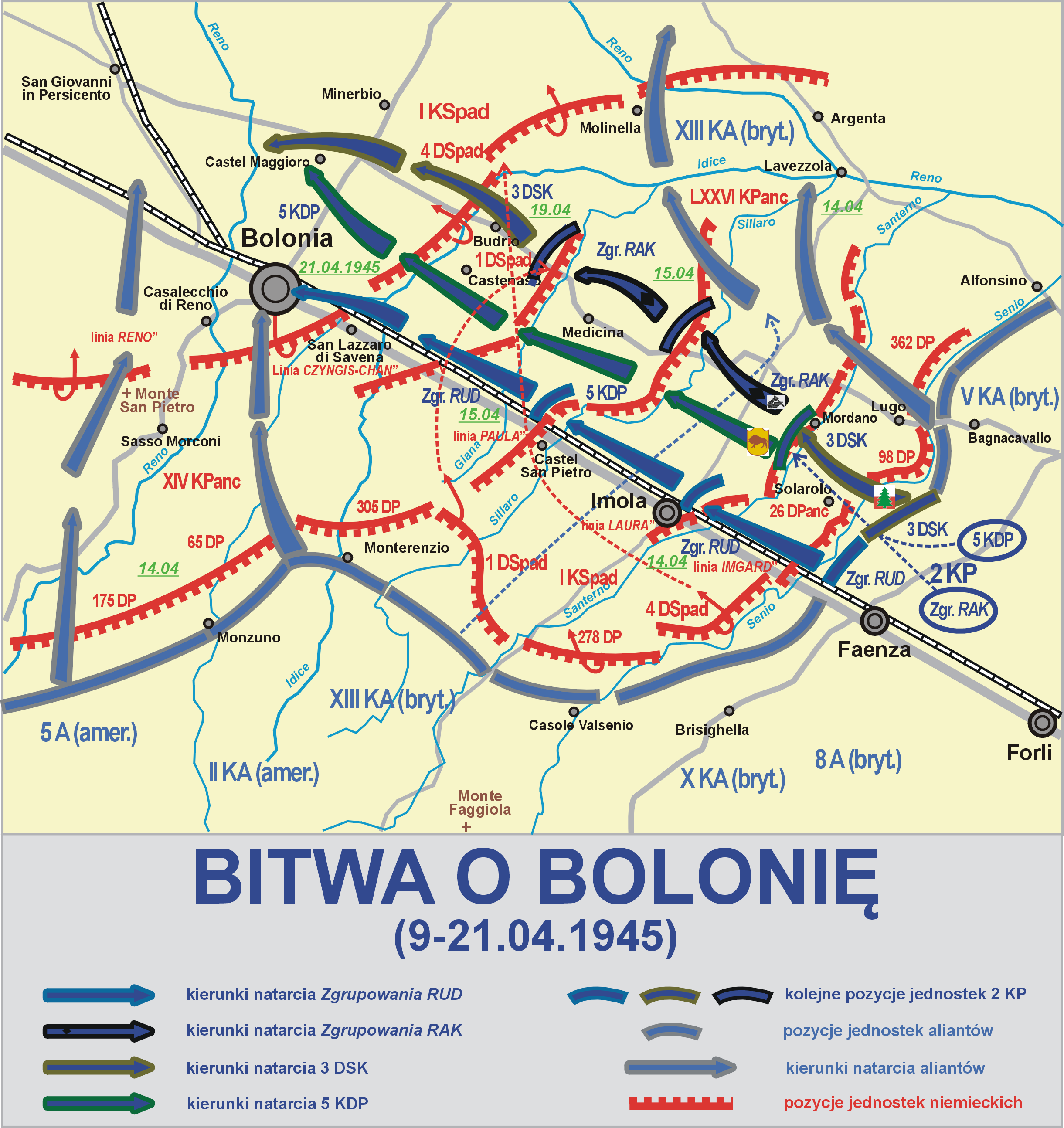
- Map of the battle
Date	9–21 April 1945
Location	Bologna, Italy 44°29′38″N 11°20′34″E
Result	Allied victory

Belligerents
Poland; United Kingdom; United States; Italy (Vargas Era) Brazil (aviation)	Germany

Commanders and leaders
(Polish government-in-exile) Władysław Anders (Polish government-in-exile) Zygmunt Bohusz-Szyszko	(Nazi Germany) Richard Heidrich

Units involved
(Polish government-in-exile) II Corps (United Kingdom) V Corps (Elements) (United States) II Corps (Elements) (Kingdom of Italy) Combat Group "Friuli" (Vargas Era) 1st Fighter Squadron	(Nazi Germany) I Parachute Corps (Nazi Germany) XIV Panzer Corps (Elements)

Casualties and losses
(Polish government-in-exile) 234 dead and 1,228 wounded (Kingdom of Italy) 84 killed, 159 wounded, 15 missing	Unknown, but heavy
- Location within Italy Battle of Bologna (Europe)

The Battle of Bologna was fought in Bologna, Italy, from 9–21 April 1945 during the Second World War, as part of the Spring 1945 offensive in Italy. The Allied forces were victorious, with the Polish II Corps and supporting Allied units capturing the city on 21 April.

== Background ==
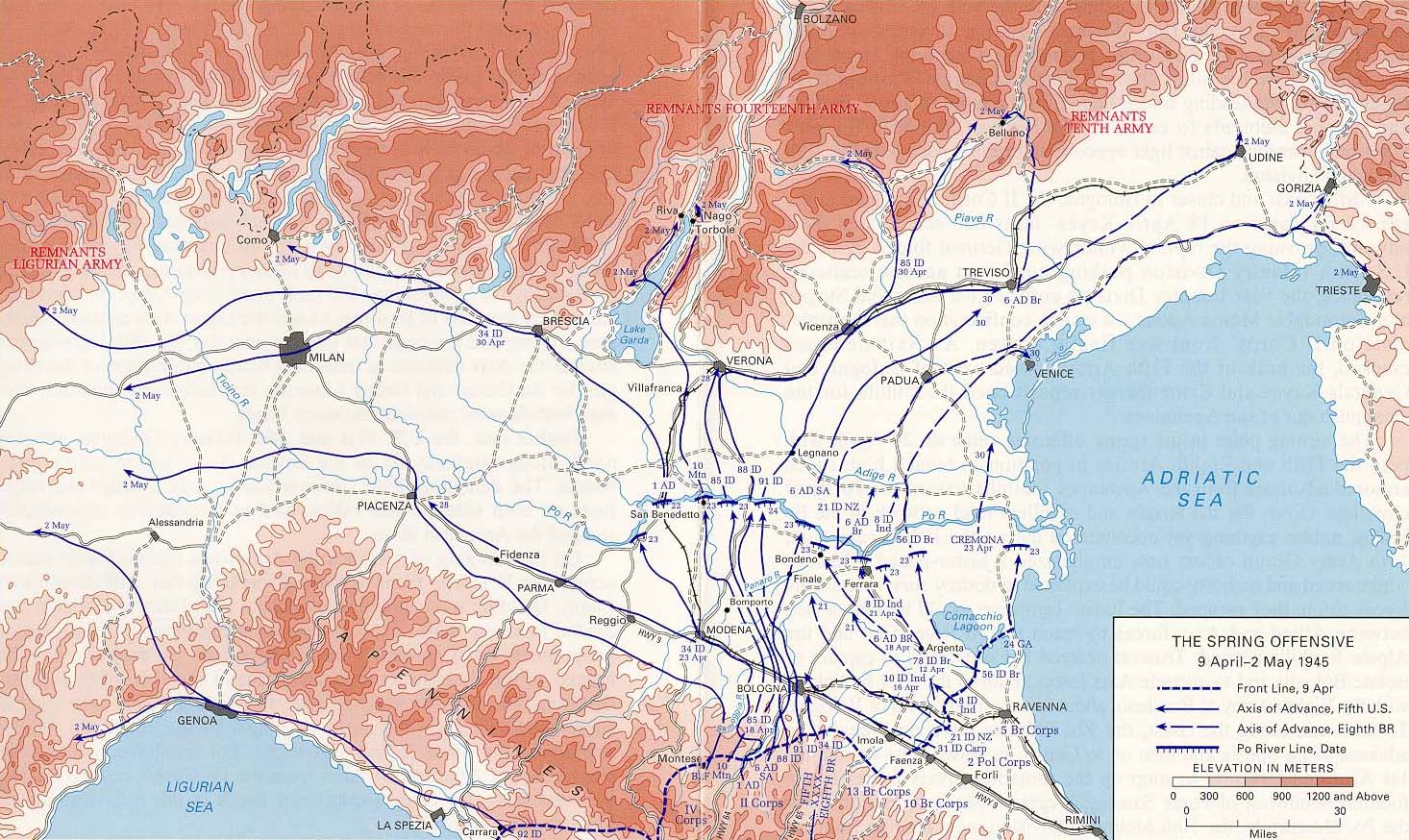
Allied Spring Offensive: Italy 1945, 9 April – 2 May. This map shows the advance of the Polish II Corps on Bologna

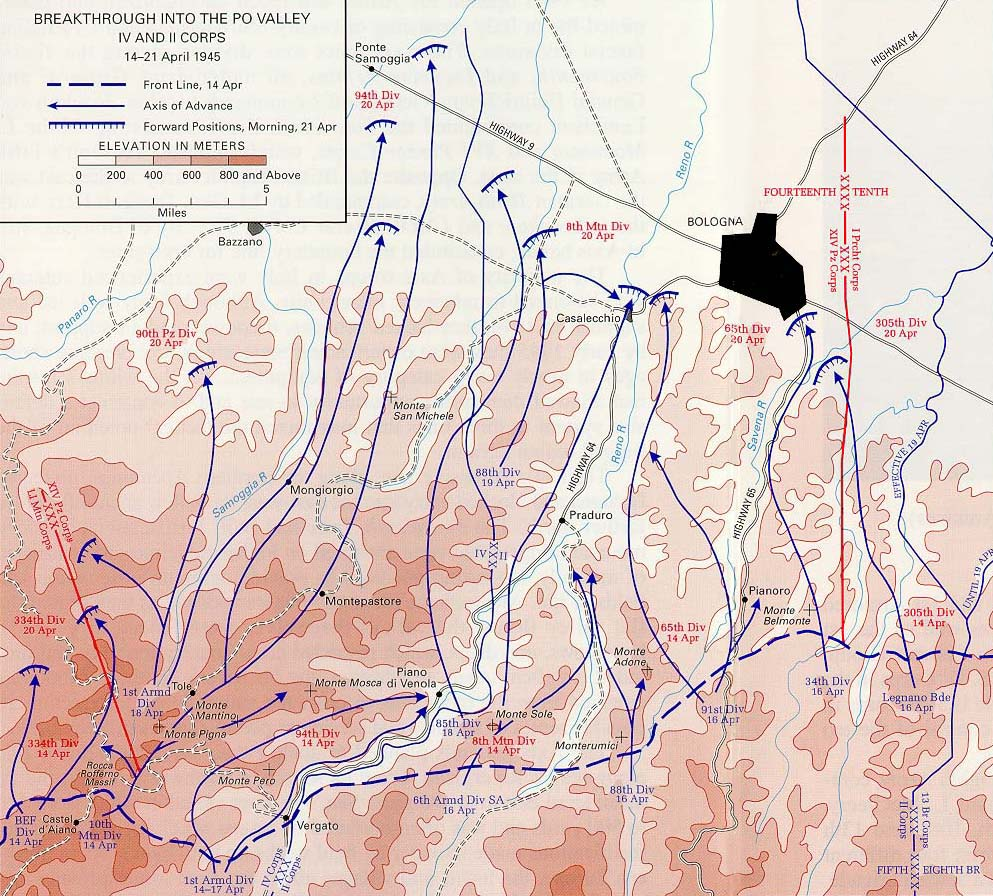
Map of US IV and II Corps breakthrough into the Po Valley, April 1945 (this map shows operations in the Bologna region, 14–21 April 1945, but does not seem to show any operations of non-US troops in the region)

In March 1945 the Allies were preparing a new offensive, Operation Buckland, in Northern Italy. The capture of Bologna, an important regional communication hub, was set as a part of that offensive. The Allied forces tasked with this were composed of the US 5th Army (II Corps, South African 6th Armoured Division) and the British 8th Army (which for that part of the theatre, was composed of the V Corps, the Polish II Corps and the Italian Combat Group "Friuli"). The German units defending the area were composed of the German 26th Panzer Division of the XIV Panzer Corps, the 1st Parachute Division and the 4th Parachute Division of the I Parachute Corps. German defenses in that region were part of the Army Group C, defending the Paula Line.

The morale of the Polish forces was weakened by the outcome of the Yalta Conference which ended on 11 February, where Winston Churchill and Franklin D. Roosevelt, without consulting the Polish government-in-exile, accepted Soviet control over a major part of the 1921–1939 Polish territories. One of the three Polish divisions, the Polish 5th Kresowa Infantry Division, was named after the Kresy region, which was now given to the Soviets in its entirety. When the Polish commander of II Corps, General Władysław Anders, asked for his unit to be withdrawn from the front line, Churchill replied "you are no longer needed" though the Allied commanders Richard McCreery, Mark Wayne Clark and Harold Alexander requested Anders to order his units to remain in their positions, as they had no troops to replace them. Anders eventually decided to keep the Polish units engaged.

== Order of battle ==
=== Allies ===
US 5th Army

II Corps

South African 6th Armoured Division

United States Army Air Forces

62d Fighter Wing

Brazilian 1st Fighter Squadron

British 8th Army

V Corps
Polish II Corps
Italian Combat Group "Friuli"

Major-General Zygmunt Bohusz-Szyszko (acting commander)

- Corps Troops
  - Army Group Polish Artillery
  - 54th Super Heavy Regiment Royal Artillery (one battery)
  - British 7th Armoured Brigade (under command)
  - 43rd Gurkha Lorried Infantry Brigade (under command)
  - 14th/20th Hussars (Kangaroo armoured personnel carriers) (under command)
- Polish 3rd Carpathian Rifle Division (Major-General Bolesław Bronisław Duch)
  - 1st Carpathian Rifle Brigade
  - 2nd Carpathian Rifle Brigade
  - 3rd Carpathian Rifle Brigade
- Polish 5th Kresowa Infantry Division (Major-General Nikodem Sulik)
  - 5th Wilenska Infantry Brigade
  - 6th Lwowska Infantry Brigade
  - 4th Wolwyn Infantry Brigade
- Polish 2nd Armoured Brigade (Brigadier-General Bronislaw Rakowski)

=== Germans ===
XIV Panzer Corps

German 26th Panzer Division
German 65th Infantry Division

I Parachute Corps (Richard Heidrich commanding)

1st Parachute Division
4th Parachute Division

== Battle ==
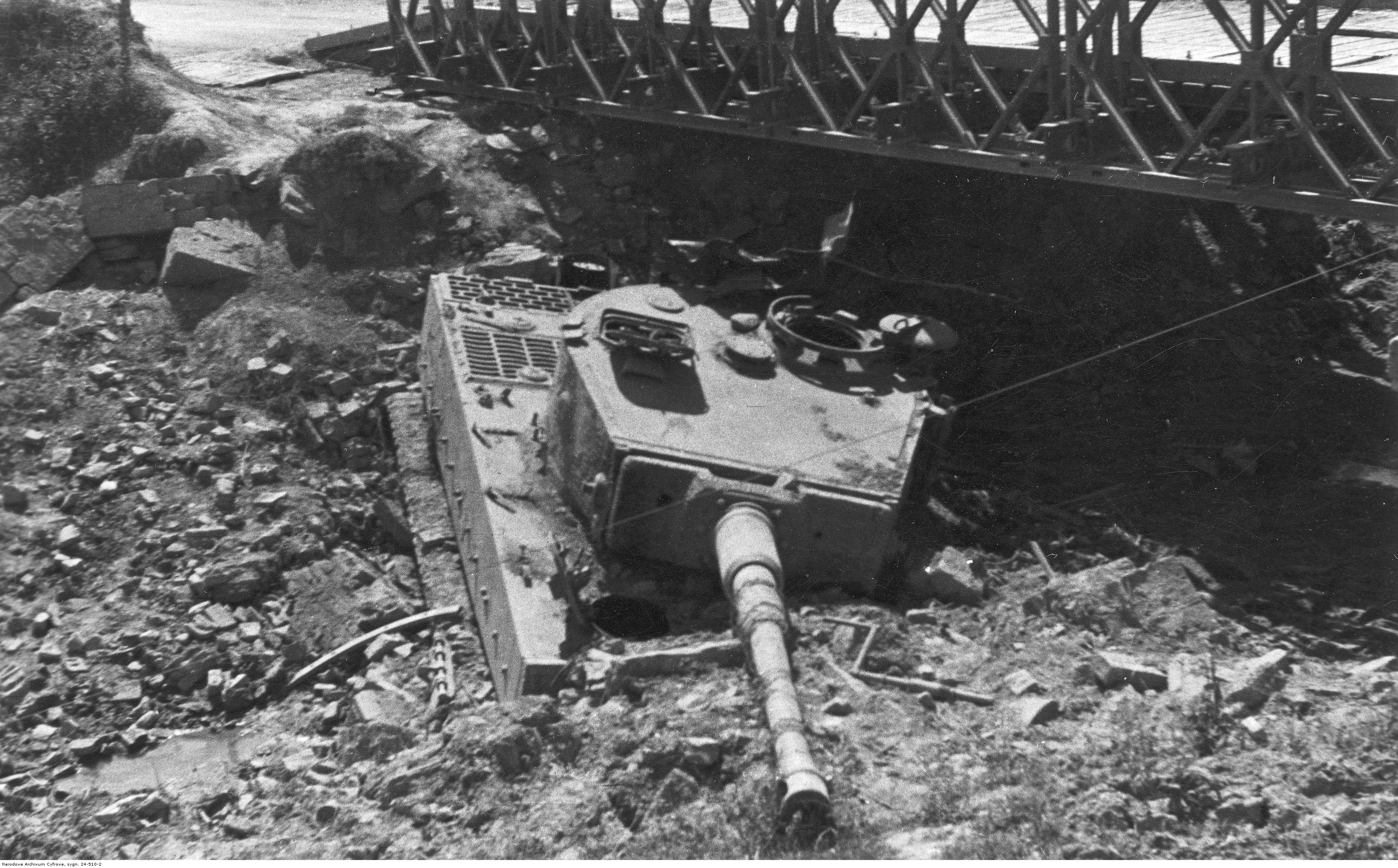
German Tiger I tank destroyed near the Medicina Canal, April 1945.

The offensive on Bologna started on 9 April at 4:00 am local time, with a major air and artillery bombardment of 400 guns firing on German positions, followed by an advance of ground forces the same evening. Friendly fire caused casualties as American bombers killed 38 advancing Polish troops on that day. The American and British units engaged the German flanks, while the Polish units broke through to the city. On 10 April, Polish forces pushed the Germans away from the Senio River. From 12 to 14 April Polish forces fought the Germans at the Santerno River and captured Imola. From 15 to 16 April, the Poles fought at the Sillaro River and the Medicina Canal. On 17 April, the commander of the Eighth Army ordered the Polish forces to continue their push towards Bologna from the east. The city was to be taken initially by the American troops of the Fifth Army advancing from the south.

On 21 April the 3rd Carpathian Rifle Brigade of the Polish 3rd Carpathian Infantry Division entered the city, where only isolated German units were still fighting. (Another source attributes the entrance to the Polish 5th Kresowa Division). By 6:15 am the Poles had secured the city, displaying Polish flags from the city hall and the Torre Asinelli tower, the highest tower in the city. The local Italian population welcomed the Poles as their liberators. At 8:00 am, American (South African) tanks arrived in the city, followed by Italian partisans and the "Friuli" division of the Italian Co-belligerent Army.

== Aftermath ==
The Battle of Bologna was the last battle of the Polish II Corps, which was taken out of the front line on 22 April. American and British troops completed their encirclement of the Germans forces north of the Reno River, the 8th Indian Division crossed the Po River and the German forces in Italy capitulated on 29 April. The Polish II Corps, commanded by General Zygmunt Bohusz-Szyszko, suffered 234 dead and 1,228 wounded out of 55,780 front line personnel.

German divisions were left in disarray, and as the end of the war neared, many splintered into small groups in order to retreat across the Po and try to reach the passes into Germany. The 65th Infantry Division lost its commander, Generalmajor Hellmuth Pfeifer in the last days of the war as he tried to make his way north with the remnants of divisional headquarters.
