= Tadeusz Machalski =

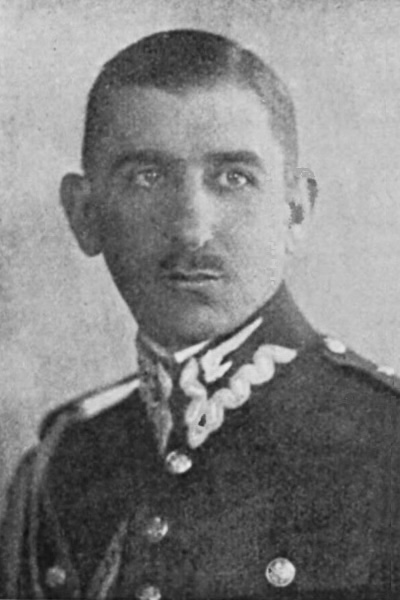
Tadeusz Machalski

Tadeusz Machalski (1893–1983) was a Polish military officer and a diplomat. Serving in the Polish Army in the rank of captain, he took part in the Polish-Bolshevik War as a cavalry NCO. After the war he remained in the military and briefly commanded the Polish 7th Cavalry Regiment between June and September 1924. Dispatched to staff and training duties, he continued his career as one of cavalry instructors. He was also the author of several cavalry handbooks and numerous articles for the Przegląd kawaleryjski (Cavalry Review) monthly

Opposed to Piłsudski, Machalski was nevertheless promoted to the rank of General while he left active service and started his career as a military attache of Poland in Ankara, Turkey. After the outbreak of World War II and the Polish defeat in the Polish Defensive War of 1939, Machalski was one of the people behind the creation of the Polish Independent Carpathian Rifles Brigade in Syria. He served at various non-notable posts during the war. Afterwards he remained in exile in the United Kingdom, where he authored several books and memoirs.
