= James Warren Childe =

English painter

James Warren Childe (1780 – 19 September 1862) was an English miniature painter.

== Biography ==
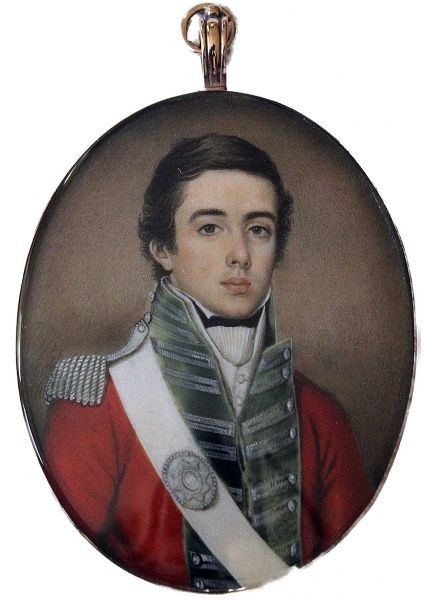
Painting by James Warren Childe

Childe was born in Poole, Dorset and first appears as an exhibitor in the Royal Academy in 1798. In that year he was residing at 29 Compton Street, Soho with his older brother Elias Childe. He was also the brother of magic lantern maker Henry Langdon Childe. His first exhibited works were landscapes, chiefly taken from London and the immediate neighborhood. He first appears as a miniature painter in 1815, and seems to have thenceforth adopted that particular line exclusively. From that year to 1853 he was a constant exhibitor of miniatures at the Royal Academy, and also at the Suffolk Street gallery. Most of his exhibited works were portraits of best known and most popular actors and actresses of the day.

== Family ==
He married Ann, née Banfield on 25 June 1810. His own children, who included singer Ann Childe Seguin and artist Maria Louisa Childe, were also favorite subjects.

Childe resided the greater part of his life at 39 Bedford Street, Covent Garden, and died at Searsdale Terrace, Kensington, on 19 September 1862, aged 82.

His middle name has also been listed as Wearing, Wearin or Waring.

== Gallery ==
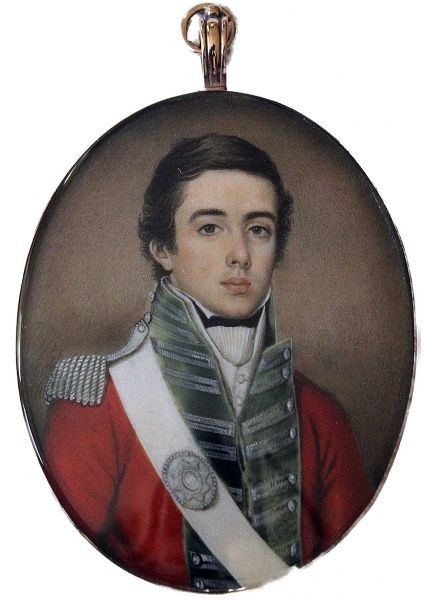

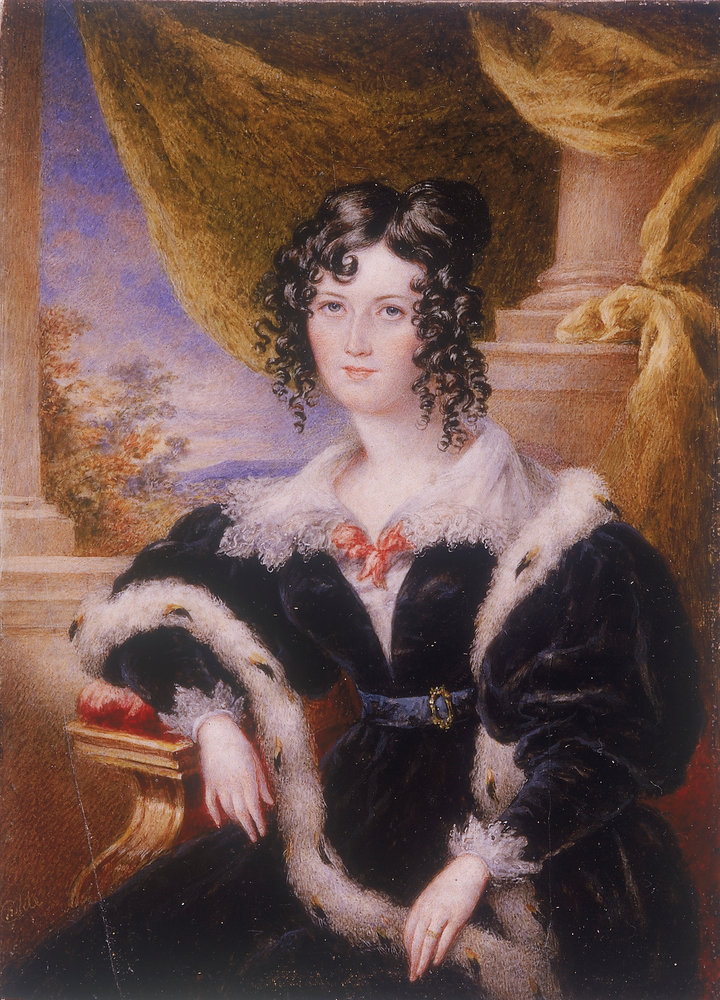

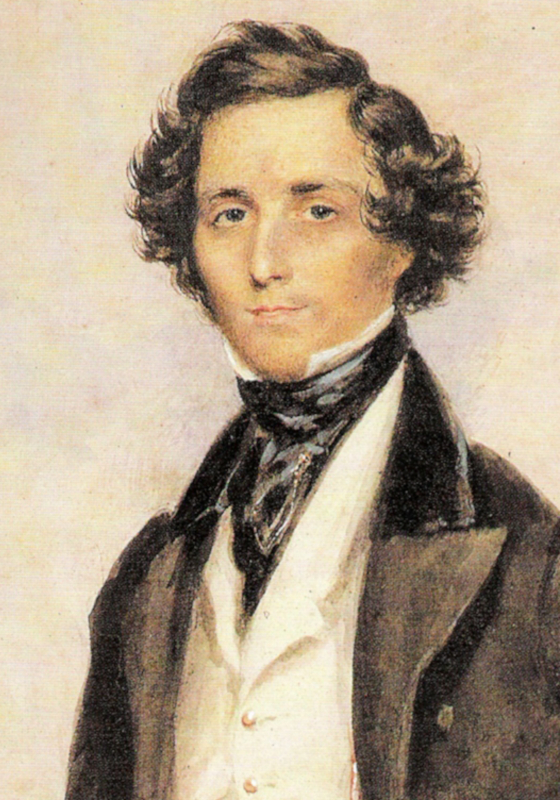

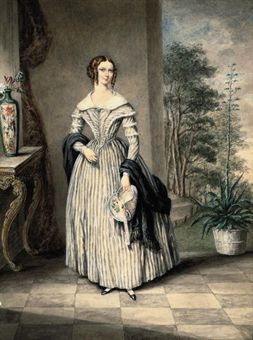

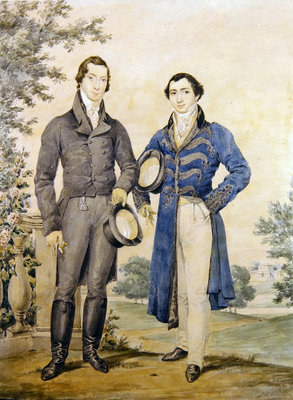

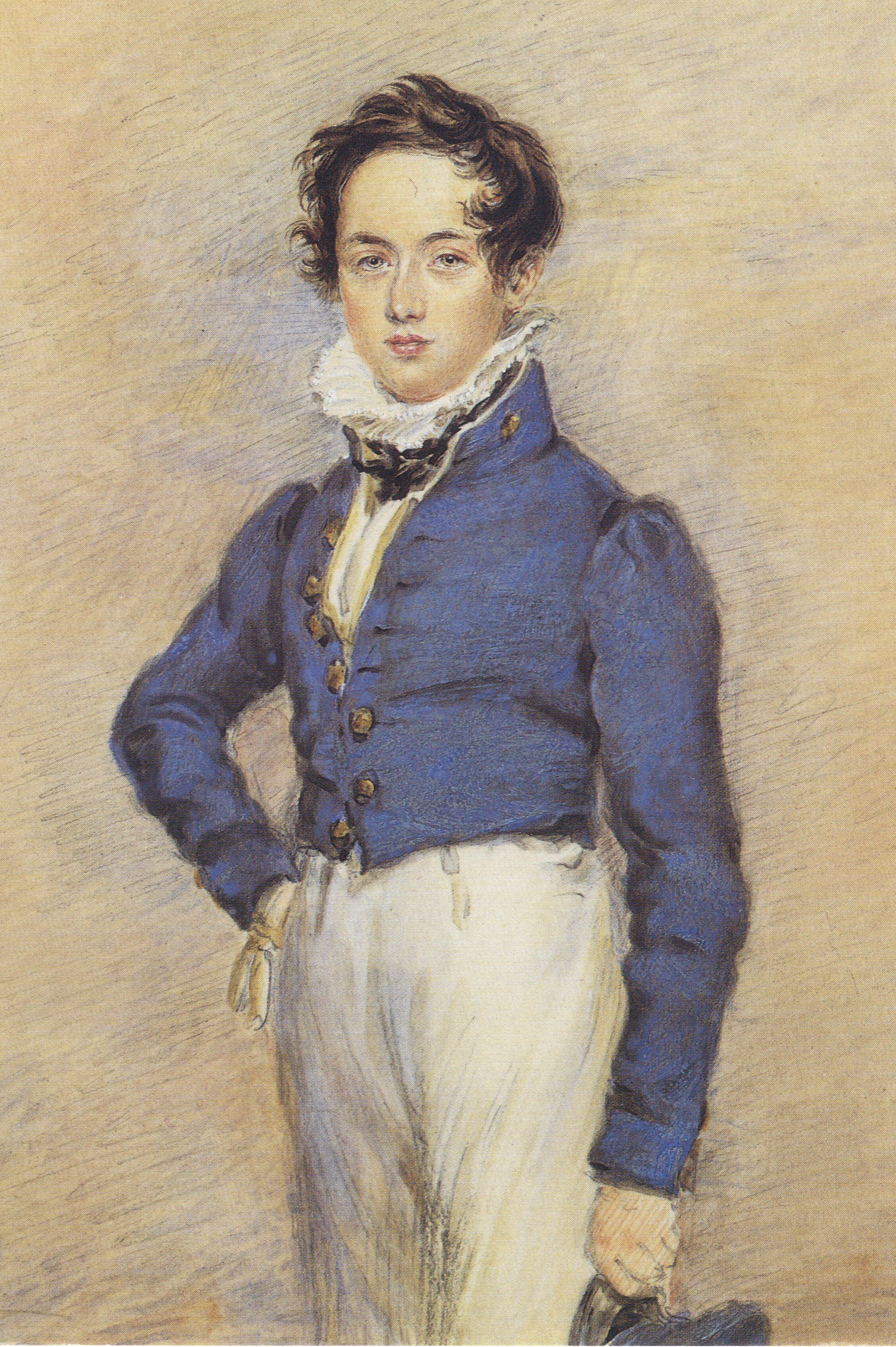
