= John Drewienkiewicz =

British Army general

Major General John Drewienkiewicz CB CMG
- Military career
- Allegiance: United Kingdom
- Branch: British Army
- Service years: 1966–2001
- Rank: Major General
- Conflicts: Kosovo War
- Awards: Companion of the Order of the Bath; Companion of the Order of St Michael and St George; Pro Memoria Medal (Poland)

Major General Karol John Drewienkiewicz CB, CMG is a retired British Army officer, generally known as "DZ".

== Early life and education ==
Drewienkiewicz attended Stamford School, an independent boarding school in southern Lincolnshire, alongside Mike Jackson, with whom he later served in Kosovo and who went on to become the professional head of the British Army.

== Army career ==
Drewienkiewicz was commissioned into the Royal Engineers in 1966 and was promoted to the rank of lieutenant in 1968, captain in 1972, major in 1978, lieutenant colonel in 1984 and colonel in 1988. Promotion to brigadier came on 31 December 1989, with seniority from 30 June that year.

Drewienkiewicz attained general officer rank with promotion to acting major general on 15 December 1994 and was appointed Engineer in Chief (Army). He was granted the substantive rank of major general on 25 April 1995 with seniority from 1 July 1994. He was appointed to the NATO role of Director of Support at LANDCENT on 28 July 1995 and to the honorary role of Colonel Commandant, Corps of Royal Engineers in 1997. In 1998, he served as military assistant to the High Representative for Bosnia and Herzegovina and was appointed a Companion of the Order of the Bath in 1998. Drewienkiewicz went on to serve as second in command, under William Walker, of the Kosovo Verification Mission (KVM), a group of unarmed observers sent into Kosovo in 1999 to oversee the United Nations-mandated reduction in arms under Slobodan Milošević's regime. Drewienkiewicz was appointed a Companion of the Order of St Michael and St George for his role in the KVM in the 2000 New Year Honours.

Drewienkiewicz retired from active service on 31 March 2001 and was appointed to the Reserve of Officers. He was succeeded as Colonel Commandant, Corps of Royal Engineers by then-Major General Mark Mans.
