= Bjørn Egge =

Norwegian general

CBE Bjørn Egge
- Egge as a captain, c. 1946
- Born: August 19, 1918; Kristiansand, Norway
- Died: July 25, 2007 (aged 88)
- Military career
- Allegiance: Norway
- Branch: Norwegian Army
- Rank: Major General
- Conflicts: Second World War

Bjørn Egge CBE (19 August 1918 – 25 July 2007) was a Major General of the Norwegian Army and President of the Norwegian Red Cross (1981–1987). He served as deputy head of the NATO Defence College (1976–1980).

Egge was a soldier during the German attack on Norway in 1940. He participated in the break out by Norwegian merchant vessels from Gothenburg in March 1942, the vessel he was on board was sunk and he was captured by the Germans.

He spent three years in concentration camps. He was arrested on 1 April 1942, and sat in Marlag und Milag Nord until being transferred to Rendsburg in early 1943. He went on to Sonnenburg in June 1943, then Sachsenhausen in November 1944. He returned to Norway in May 1945. After the war Egge entered officers training and served in the Norwegian army in various positions.

Egge served with the Norwegian contingent in the Congo Crisis in 1960 as an intelligence officer, and was the first United Nations official to arrive at the scene of United Nations Secretary-General Dag Hammarskjöld's airplane crash. Bjorn Egge died on 25 July 2007, believed to be of old age or illness.

== Awards ==
Egge was a Commander of the Royal Norwegian Order of St Olav, Commander of the Order of the British Empire, Knight of the Order of the Sword, Knight of the Order of the Falcon, officer of the French Legion d'honneur as well as recipient of the Polish Medal Pro Memoria. He also held the Atlantic Star.

In 2005 Egge was awarded the Henry Dunant Medal.

Order of St. Olav	Norwegian War medal	Defence Medal 1940–1945
Order of the British Empire	Atlantic Star	Order of the Falcon
Order of the Sword	Legion d'honneur	Medal Pro Memoria

== Bibliography ==
- Tilbakeblikk på NATO (1989)
- De ga oss en dag til å bruke (Oslo: Forum, 1996, ISBN 8203290728) – autobiography
- Kriger for fred: et liv for forsvar, frihet og fred (Hundvåg: Norsk tidsskrift for sjøvesen, 2004, ISBN 8292217169) – revised autobiography
- A Warrior for Peace: From Nazi Night and Fog prisoner to peace advocate – English edition of the autobiography (Leif Høegh's Foundation, 3rd printing 2012; e-book edition 2026, ASIN B0HJHV1282)

== External link ==
- bjornegge.com – family archive, with timeline and sources
