= Stanisław Kopański =

Polish general

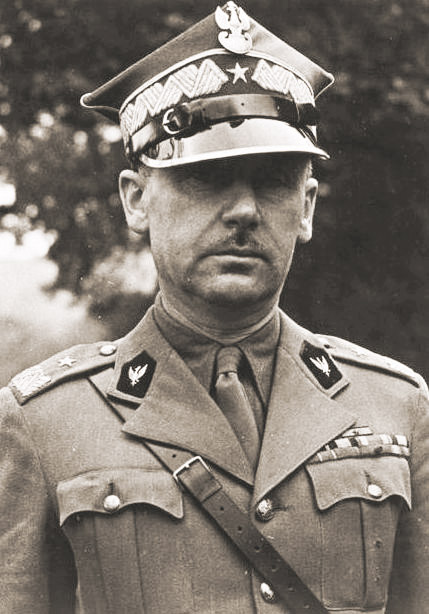
- General Stanisław Kopański
- Born: 19 May 1895; St. Petersburg, Russian Empire
- Died: 23 March 1976 (aged 80); London, England
- Military career
- Allegiance: Russian Empire; Poland
- Branch: Imperial Russian Army; Polish Army
- Service years: 1914–1921; 1923–1949
- Rank: Generał dywizji (Major general)
- Commands: General Inspector of Polish Armed Forces in Exile; Polish Resettlement Corps; Chief of Staff of the Commander-in-Chief of the Polish Armed Forces in the West; 3rd Carpathian Rifle Division; Polish Carpathian Brigade; 1st Regiment of Self-propelled Artillery; 1st Mounted Artillery Detachment
- Conflicts: World War I Polish–Ukrainian War; Polish–Soviet War; World War II
- Awards: Golden Cross of the War Order of Virtuti Militari; Grand Cross of the Order of Polonia Restituta; Golden Cross of Merit with Swords; Cross of Valour (2); Companion of the Order of the Bath (United Kingdom); Commander of the Order of the British Empire (United Kingdom); Distinguished Service Order (United Kingdom); Knight of the Legion of Honour (France); Croix de Guerre (France)

General Stanisław Kopański (19 May 1895 – 23 March 1976) was a Polish military commander, politician, diplomat, an engineer and one of the best-educated Polish officers of the time, serving with distinction during World War II. He is best known as the creator and commander of the Polish Independent Carpathian Brigade and Polish 3rd Carpathian Infantry Division.

Between 1943 and 1946, he was Chief of Staff of the Commander-in-Chief of the Polish Armed Forces in the West.

== Early life ==
Stanisław Kopański was born on 19 May 1895 in Saint Petersburg, Russian Empire to Polish parents. In 1905, he enrolled in a local Polish gymnasium (high school), where he graduated upon passing his matura examinations. Afterwards, he matriculated in a local Institute of Civil Engineering, but his studies were interrupted by the outbreak of World War I.

== World War I and the establishment of the Second Polish Republic ==
In 1914, Kopański was drafted into the Russian Army. He graduated from the Mikhailovskoye School of Artillery and served on the war's eastern front in the 3rd battery of the Russian 2nd Cavalry Division. After the February Revolution, he left the Russian Army and joined the Polish 1st Corps, being formed in Russia as part of the Entente forces. Demobilized after the Treaty of Brest-Litovsk, he left for Warsaw (then still occupied by the Central Powers), where he planned to enter the reopened Warsaw University to complete his education.

Kopański was unable to realize his plans, however, as Poland regained its independence in November 1918 and immediately became engaged in the Polish–Ukrainian War. The Polish Army badly needed experienced officers, and Kopański joined the 1st Uhlans Regiment, with which he fought in the battles of Przemyśl, Gródek Jagielloński and Lwów.

At the end of hostilities, Kopański remained in the army and fought in the opening stages of the Polish–Soviet War in the Lida and Wilno areas, in the forces of Colonel Władysław Belina-Prażmowski. On 20 April 1919, during the fighting in Wilno, he was badly wounded and lost his left eye. Following a brief hospitalization, he returned to active service, this time as commander of the Artillery NCO School in Warsaw.

However, Kopański requested to be sent back to the front and in September 1919, became commander of the 1st Mounted Artillery Detachment. In 1920, he joined the 8th Uhlans Regiment, with which he took part in the famous battles of Komarów and Tyszowce. In October 1920, he was awarded the Silver Cross of Virtuti Militari.

== Inter-war Poland ==
After the Peace of Riga, Kopański was demobilized and allowed to finally finish his engineering studies, this time at the Warsaw University of Technology. However, in 1923, he returned to army service and became the deputy commander of the Artillery Officers School in Toruń. Promoted to the rank of major in 1924, he held that post until 1927. In October of that year, he was dispatched to Paris, where he commenced his studies at the Ecole Superieure de Guerre, one of the most notable military academies of the time. After a brief service in the French School for Artillery Officers, he returned to Poland, where he became the commander of the 3rd Detachment of the General Staff (Operational). In May 1930, he became the commanding officer of one of the battalions within the 6th Heavy Artillery Regiment, stationed in Lwów, but resumed his post in the General Staff a year later. In early 1935, he became the deputy commander of armoured troops and, after additional two years of service there, he was made the commanding officer of the Stryj-based Polish 1st Regiment of Self-propelled Artillery, the most technologically advanced Polish artillery unit of the time. On 13 March 1939, in the course of the Polish secret mobilization, Kopański became the head of the 3rd Detachment of the General Staff and six days later, he was promoted to colonel.

== World War II ==
=== Polish Defensive War ===
After the outbreak of the Polish Defensive War, Kopański remained on the staff of Marshal of Poland Edward Rydz-Śmigły. The staff was evacuated from Warsaw on 6 September 1939 to Polish temporary headquarters in Brześć nad Bugiem. However, due to fast pace of German advance, the headquarters had to be evacuated further southwards, through Młynów, Kołomyja and Kosów, to the town of Kuty, where it was to organize the defense of the so-called Romanian Bridgehead. However, the Soviet invasion of Poland of 17 September 1939 made that plan obsolete and Kopański was evacuated to Romania, a country which at that time was allied with Poland. There, at both German and French insistence, the Polish highest authorities were interned by the Romanians. However, most of the soldiers interned in prisoner of war camps were able to escape with the secret consent of the Romanian authorities; Kopański himself fled the Călimăneşti internment camp, traveling through Bucharest and Constanţa to reach France in late October 1939.

=== Formation of the Carpathian Brigade ===
In France, Kopański applied for a post in one of the Polish units being formed in France and Great Britain at that time. Initially, however, the Polish government in exile of Władysław Sikorski held most of the high-ranking officers of the pre-war Polish Army in reserve and instead gave command of newly formed units to officers who had actively opposed the Sanacja authorities before the lost campaign. It was not until 5 April 1940 that Kopański was finally given command of the Polish Carpathian Brigade, being formed in Homs on the border between French-held Syria and Lebanon.

The unit was composed mostly of Polish soldiers who were able to escape prisoner of war camps in Hungary and Romania and make it to Allied-controlled territory, much like Kopański himself. On 12 April 1940 the brigade was officially formed and the new unit joined the French Armée du Levant. As a unit specializing in mountain warfare, the brigade was thought of as a Polish contribution to the Allied plan of landing in the Balkans. It was modelled after a standard French mountain infantry brigade. Although new recruits arrived on a daily basis, the brigade did not reach the planned strength of 208 officers and 6840 soldiers and NCOs.

=== Carpathian Brigade joins the British Army ===
After the capitulation of France nullified all pacts that country had with Poland and the United Kingdom, the commander of the Armee de Levant, General Eugène Mittelhauser, decided to support the new government of Philippe Pétain and Vichy France. He ordered the brigade to be disarmed and took Kopański as a hostage. However, due to strong opposition within Mittelhauser's own staff, he had to set Kopański free the following day. Kopański then followed the orders of General Sikorski and left French-controlled territory. On 30 June 1940 the brigade defected to the British Mandate of Palestine, where it joined the British forces stationed there. It was the only large military unit of the Armee de Levant to defect as a complete unit, with all of its equipment.

=== Western Desert Campaign ===
Initially composed of 319 officers and 3,437 soldiers, Kopański's brigade soon grew to roughly 5,000 men. Among the distinctive features of the unit was the high morale of the soldiers, all volunteers. In addition, roughly 25 percent were educated, a thing uncommon in European armies of the time. Kopański continued to train his men in mountain warfare, but also in warfare in desert conditions, completely alien to the Polish soldiers. In August 1941, the brigade was moved by sea from Palestine to the besieged town of Tobruk, where the unit took part in the final four months of the siege. After the siege was lifted on December 10, the brigade joined British forces in their pursuit of the withdrawing Italo-German armies and fought in the Battle of Gazala.

=== Formation of 3rd Carpathian Rifle Division ===
On 21 April 1942, after more than two years in constant service, Kopański was given a three weeks leave in London. On the day of his arrival there, he was appointed by General Sikorski as commander of the newly formed 3rd Carpathian Rifle Division. He organized that division out of his former unit and newly arrived soldiers of the Polish II Corps of General Władysław Anders, who had been liberated from Soviet gulags and then evacuated to Persia and Palestine. His new division was prepared and trained to take part in the Italian Campaign.

=== London ===
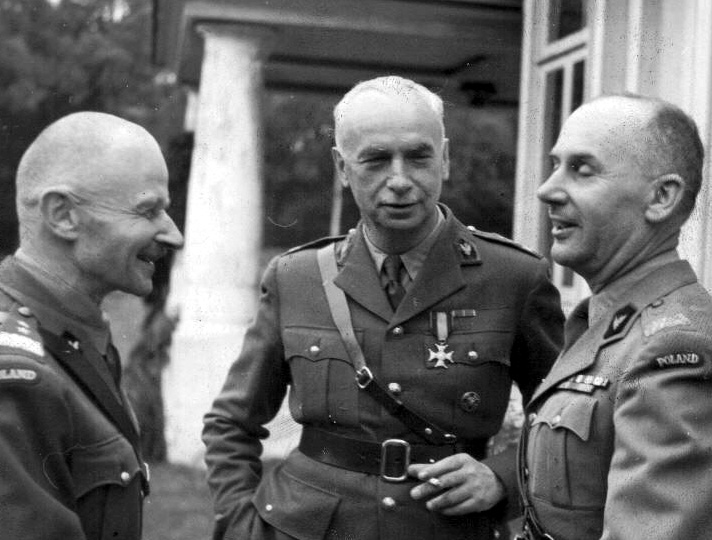
Kopański (right) with Marian Kukiel (left) and Kazimierz Sosnkowski (centre), in London, 1944.

Shortly before the invasion of Italy commenced, Kopański was withdrawn to London on 21 July 1943, where he was appointed Chief of Staff of the Commander-in-Chief of the Polish Armed Forces in the West. A skilled front-line officer, Kopański did not have much work "behind the desk", especially since, while most of the Polish units were fighting under Polish command, they were part of Allied fronts and armies. Because of that, on 20 October 1944, Kopański tried to resign. However, the President of Poland, Władysław Raczkiewicz, would not accept his resignation; instead, Kopański was promoted to the rank of Division General two days later. He remained Chief of Staff of the Polish Armed Forces until the end of World War II.

After the war the Allied governments withdrew their support from the Polish government, and the Polish forces were transformed into the Polish Resettlement Corps. This was a paramilitary organization designed to allow Polish veterans who were unwilling to return to communist-dominated Poland to find employment and homes in the west. In 1946 Kopański, became commander of the corps, and on 26 September that year he was deprived of Polish citizenship by the Communists.

== Post-war ==
After the corps disbanded in 1949, Kopański settled in the United Kingdom. He remained an active member of the Polish government-in-exile and until 1970, held the honorary title of Chief of General Staff. On May 13 of that year, his office was disbanded and transformed into the office of the General Inspector of Polish Armed Forces in Exile. The post, despite its name, was connected mostly with historical activity and Kopański focused on supporting various social and economic veteran associations. He also collaborated with the Sikorski Institute. Between 1970 and 1973 he was also a member of the Council of Three, a collegial body created by the Polish Government in Exile in 1954 with prerogatives of the President of Poland. Stanisław Kopański also wrote a number of books and memoirs.

On 23 November 1971 the Communist authorities of Poland declared their decision to deprive Kopański of citizenship null and void; this however was never made public. He died on 23 March 1976 in London and was buried at the Northwood Cemetery.

In December 2023 the remains of Kopański and his wife, Janina Kopańska, were returned to Poland and received a military funeral before being interred at Powązki Military Cemetery.

== Promotions ==
- Podporucznik (Second lieutenant) - 1916
- Porucznik (First lieutenant) - 1918
- Kapitan (Captain) - 1 June 1919
- Major (Major) - 1 December 1924
- Podpułkownik (Lieutenant colonel) - 14 December 1931
- Pułkownik (Colonel) - 19 March 1939
- Generał brygady (Brigadier general) - 3 May 1940
- Generał dywizji (Major general) - 23 October 1944

== Awards and decorations ==
- Golden Cross of Virtuti Militari (1940)
- Silver Cross of Virtuti Militari (1922)
- Grand Cross of Order of Polonia Restituta (posthumously, 1976)
- Officer's Cross of Order of Polonia Restituta
- Cross of Valour (twice)
- Golden Cross of Merit with Swords
- Golden Cross of Merit (18 March 1933)
- Medal of Independence (16 March 1933)
- Companion of the Order of the Bath (United Kingdom)
- Commander of the Order of the British Empire (United Kingdom))
- Distinguished Service Order (United Kingdom)
- Chevalier of Legion of Honour France)
- Croix de Guerre (France)
- Czechoslovak War Cross 1939–1945 (Czechoslovakia)
- Conventual Chaplains Grand Cross ad honorem of the Sovereign Military Order of Malta

== Bibliography ==
- Stanisław Kopański: Wspomnienia wojenne 1939–1945 (1961)
- Stanisław Kopański: Moja Służba w Wojsku Polskim 1917–1939 (1965)
