= Smith Child =

Smith Child may refer to:

- Smith Child (Royal Navy officer), Royal Navy admiral and grandfather of the 1st Baronet
- Sir Smith Child, 1st Baronet (1808–1896), English politician, MP for Staffordshire North 1851–1859 and Staffordshire West 1868–1874
- Sir Smith Child, 2nd Baronet (1880–1958), MP for Stone 1918–1922

== See also ==
- Child (surname)
