= Teresa Klimek =

Polish educator and activist

- Born: Teresa Maria Tomaszewska-Bończa; 11 October 1929; Hrubieszów, Poland
- Died: 29 December 2013 (aged 84); Gorzów Wielkopolski, Poland
- Occupations: math teacher and trade unionist
- Years active: 1952-1990s
- Known for: Co-founding the regional Catholic Intellectuals Club and serving on the regional Solidarity executive

Teresa Klimek (1929-2013) was a Polish educator and activist. Educated to teach mathematics, she taught in various schools in Gorzów Wielkopolski from 1953 to 1984 and was honored for her skill as an educator. She helped found the Gorzów Wielkopolski branch of the Catholic Intellectuals Club as well as the regional branch of Solidarity. Her activism during Poland's struggle for democracy was widely recognized at both the local and national level and she was honored with numerous medals and awards.

== Early life ==
Teresa Maria Tomaszewska-Bończa was born on 11 October 1929 in Hrubieszów, Poland to the noble families of Stanisław Bończa-Tomaszewski and Marii Skrzetuskiej. After her parents' divorce, Tomaszewska-Bończa was raised by her maternal grandparents Kazimierza Skrzetuskiego and Maria (née Dobrowolska) Skrzetuska. She was the great-granddaughter of Antoni Skrzetuski, who was honored for his military service in the January Uprising. The family moved often during the war, living in Wrzesnia, Zwierzyniec, Przeworsk and Mogilno, before she entered high school in 1944. In 1949, she graduated from the Bolesława Chrobrego High School in Gniezno and went on to further her studies at the Adam Mickiewicz University in Poznań (UAM), studying mathematics from 1949 to 1952.

== Career ==
After graduation, Tomaszewska-Bończa studied briefly at the Polish Naval Academy and then between 1952 and 1953 she taught at a vocational school in Gdynia. In 1953, Tomaszewska-Bończa married Władysław Klimek, moved to Gorzów Wielkopolski and taught at the Gastronomic Technical College (Polish: Technikum Gastronomicznym) for two years. In 1957, she began teaching at the Chemical Technical College (Polish: Technikum Chemicznym), where she remained until 1972. She completed a master's degree UAM in 1966 and in 1976 completed her post-graduate studies in computer science at the University of Warsaw. Between 1972 and 1984 she taught mathematics at the Maria Sklodowska-Curie High School in Gorzów Wielkopolski. During this time frame, she also worked on an experimental project between 1976 and 1980 launched in high schools by the Science Ministry. Klimek retired from teaching in 1984.

In the 1970s, Klimek helped organize the Catholic Intellectuals Club (Polish: Klub Inteligencji Katolickiej (KIK)), which she and her husband Władysław had founded. KIK's purpose was to stimulate independent thought and bring Catholics within Poland information about Catholic philosophy from countries outside the Socialist Bloc. Though it had to operate illegally and could not be registered until 1981, the group challenged authorities and openly promoted the organization. Beginning in 1980, Klimek was also engaged in the business of the Polish Trade Union, "Solidarity" (Polish: Niezależny Samorządny Związek Zawodowy (NSZZ)). Solidarity's goals were to bring about socio-economic reforms by changing the political system. Klimek promoted the organization in schools, encouraging students to found an independent student organization. She served on the regional board and was a delegate to the provincial congress as a Solidarity delegate.

From 1980 to 1981 Klimek served on an assistance committee for prisoners of conscience and provided care for members who were imprisoned. She was interned between 15 December 1981 and 27 June 1982 in camps in Poznań and Gołdap, during the implementation of martial law in Poland. Martial law was imposed to frighten people and make them think that Polish Communism was strong and could not be overthrown. After her release, Klimek worked in the Catholic Underground in support of Solidarity. Crucial to the underground's success was the underground press and in Gorzów Wielkopolski, Klimek's husband Władysław edited several journals and wrote articles for Solidarity.

Under the pseudonym "Simeon and Agnik", in 1983 Klimek wrote the activist's song "Feniksa" (Phoenix). In 1986, Klimek was involved in the reactivation of Solidarity and became a member of the Regional Executive Committee for the union. Klimek initiated the Gorzów Committee for the Memory of the Victims of Katyn and was made an honorary member of Gorzów's Katyn Families.

== Death and legacy ==
Klimek died on 29 December 2013 in Gorzów Wielkopolski. Both during her lifetime, and posthumously, Klimek was decorated for her activism and excellence as an educator. She was recipient of the Merit Award for Gorzowski Region (1998); Gold Badge of the National Section of Education NSZZ "S" (2005); Pro Memoria Medal (2005); Knight's Cross of the Order of Polonia Restituta (2009); Merit for the Lubuskie Province (2009); Merit Award for the City of Gorzow (2010), Silver Medal of the Medal of Guardian Places of National Remembrance (2010), Award of the Region Gorzowski NSZZ "S" (2010), Honorary Citizen of Gorzów Wielkopolski (2013); and Cross of Freedom and Solidarity (2015)
