= Montessori St Nicholas Charity =

The Montessori St Nicholas Charity seeks to promote Montessori education by means of training teachers, providing information, advice and support to schools, managing its own schools, and undertaking charitable projects to inform and sustain the Montessori community in the UK.

== History ==
On 29 March 1954, The St Nicholas Montessori Centre was established as an education trust to represent the continuation of the Training Centre started by Margaret Hompray and Phoebe Child, two former students of Maria Montessori. In 1967, the trustees purchased No. 23 Princes Gate while the co-principals acquired No. 24 and later allowed the trust to purchase it from them. By 1971 the Centre held accredited full-time, part-time and Saturday courses. It also had a successful Montessori school and facilities for resident students and children. In 1978, the two co-principals retired and moved to America. The leadership of St Nicholas was entrusted to Bridget Birts who served the Montessori community until 1983 and in whose name the Birts Scholarship was founded.

In 1998, the London Montessori Centre founded by Lesley Britton and Montessori St Nicholas formed Montessori Centre International, consolidating the work of two Montessori centres. MCI has trained 4,000 students from around the world over the last 20 years.

== Montessori teacher training ==
The training includes: in-depth investigation of the Montessori philosophy and materials, exercises of practical life, education of the senses, literacy skills, mathematics, cultural subjects, art and craft, music and movement, drama, child development, observation and assessment, contemporary issues, childcare and health, safety, nutrition and special needs.
