= Robert Childers =

Robert Childers may refer to:

- Robert Caesar Childers (1838–1876), British Orientalist scholar
- Erskine Childers (author) (1870–1922), author and Irish nationalist
- Robert L. Childers, judge in Tennessee

== See also ==
- Robert Child (disambiguation)
