= Pro Memoria Medal =

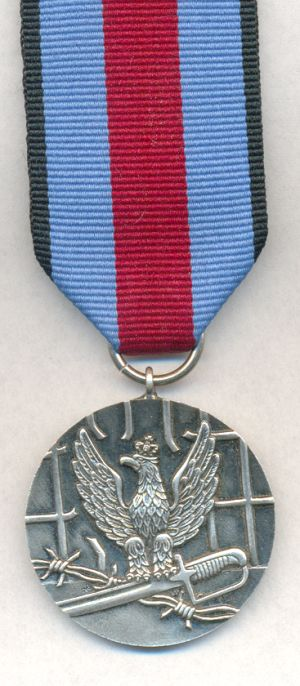
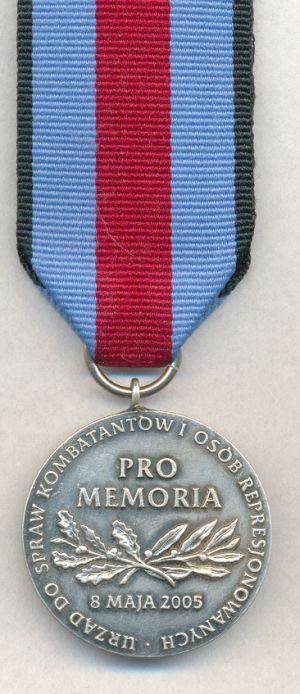
- Awarded for: Outstanding contributions in perpetuating the memory of the people and deeds in the struggle for Polish independence during World War II
- Country: Poland
- Presented by: the Office for War Veterans and Victims of Oppression
- Established: 25 January 2005
- Ribbon bar of the medal

Precedence
- Next (higher): Pro Patria Medal

The Pro Memoria Medal is a Polish civil state decoration awarded by the head of the Office for War Veterans and Victims of Oppression. Established 25 January 2005, the medal is awarded for outstanding contributions in perpetuating the memory of the people and deeds in the struggle for Polish independence during World War II.

== Description ==
The medal is disc shaped made of silver colored metal. The obverse of the medal shows the Polish Eagle sitting on a sword crossed with barbed wire. In the background is a breached fence. On the reverse around the rim is the inscription URZĄD DO SPRAW KOMBATANTÓW I OSÓB REPRESJONOWANYCH (Office for War Veterans and Victims of Oppression). In the center is the inscription PRO MEMORIA over crossed oak and laurel branches, and the date: 8 MAJA 2005, the 60th anniversary of the end of World War II.

The medal is suspended from a ribbon in the colors blue, magenta, and black. The colors refer to the ribbons of the Virtuti Militari, the Cross of Valor, and the Cross of Merit with Swords.

== Notable recipients ==
- Philip Bujak
- John Drewienkiewicz
- Bjørn Egge
- Franciszek Gągor
- Wojciech Jaruzelski
- Andrzej Karweta
- Teresa Klimek
- Teresa Potocka
- Bernard Skarbek
- Maria Skarbek
- Gunnar Sønsteby
