= Paul Child =

Paul Child may refer to:

- Paul Child (singer) (born 1969), Welsh singer
- Paul Child (actor) (born 1983), English actor
- Paul Child (soccer) (born 1952), English former US soccer player
- Paul Cushing Child, husband of chef, author and television personality Julia Child
