= Paula Line =

Paula Line refers to the German defense line in late World War II, around the Sillaro river in northern Italy. Defended by the I Parachute Corps, it was breached by II Polish Corps around 15 April 1945.
