= Fay G. Child =

American politician

Fay George Child (September 17, 1908 – April 2, 1965) was an American politician and newspaper editor.

Child was born in Wabasha, Wabasha County, Minnesota. He lived in Maynard, Chippewa County, Minnesota and went to the Maynard grade and high schools. Child served as Mayor of Maynard, Minnesota and on the Maynard School Board and was the clerk of the school board. Child was the editor and owner of the Maynard News. He served in the Minnesota Senate from 1951 until his unexpected from a heart attack in 1965.

Child died suddenly, aged 56, of a heart attack while talking at a committee hearing at the Minnesota State Capitol in Saint Paul, Minnesota.
