= Polish Independent Carpathian Rifle Brigade =

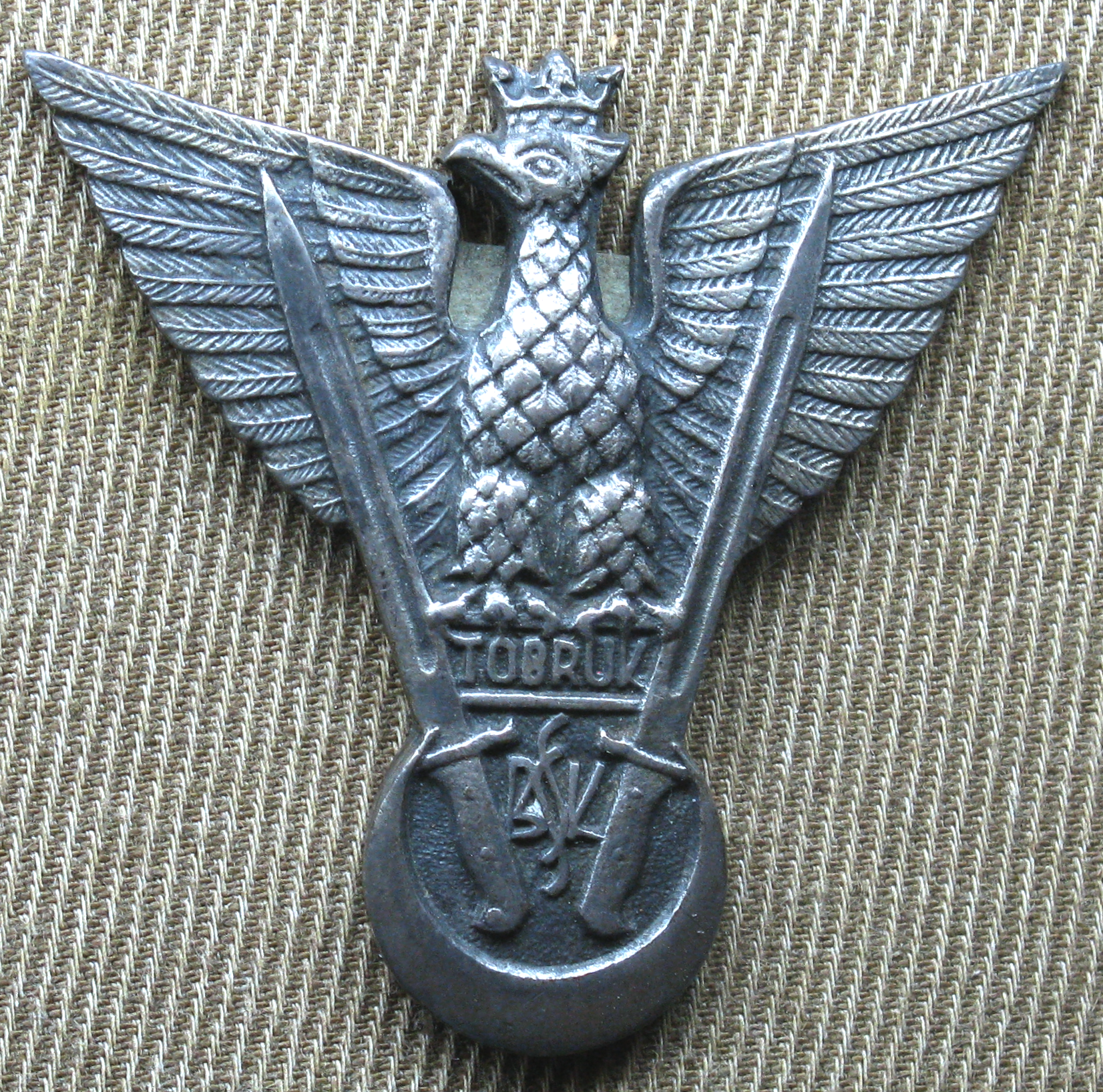
- Active: 12 April 1940 – 3 May 1942
- Type: Infantry
- Size: Brigade
- Engagements: World War II: Siege of Tobruk; Operation Crusader

Commanders
- Notable commanders: Stanisław Kopański

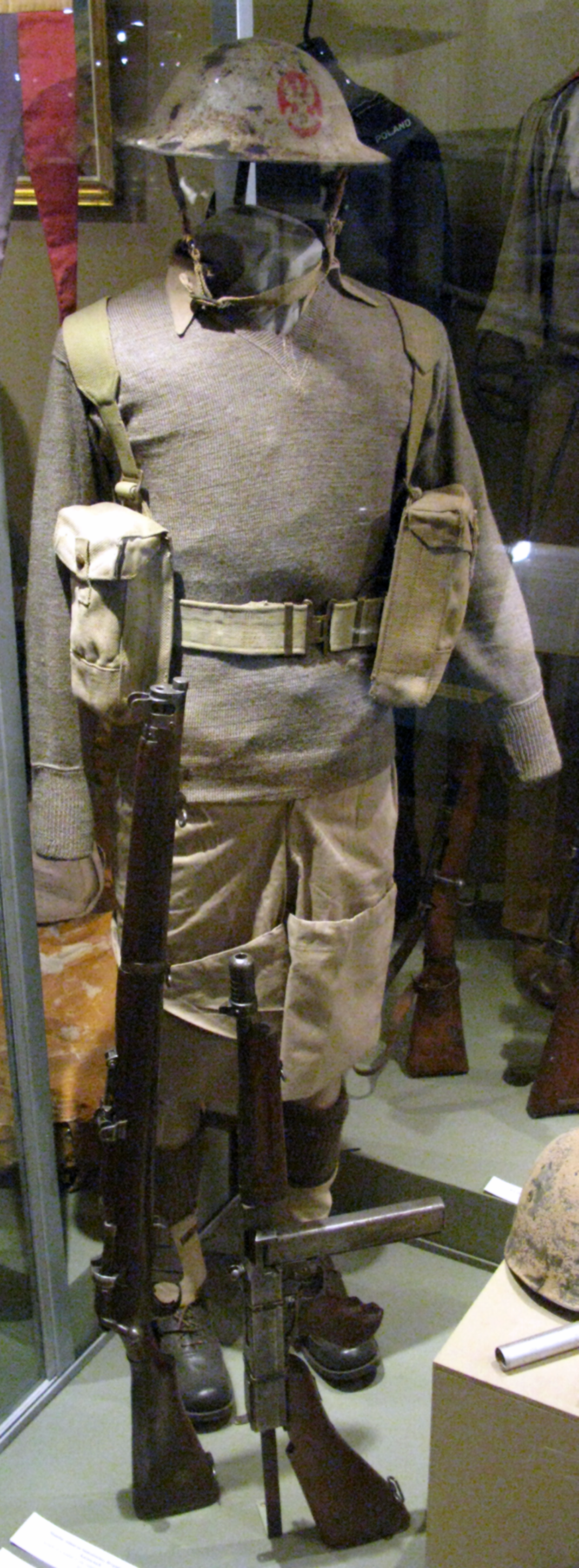
Uniform of soldier of Polish Independent Carpathian Rifle Brigade

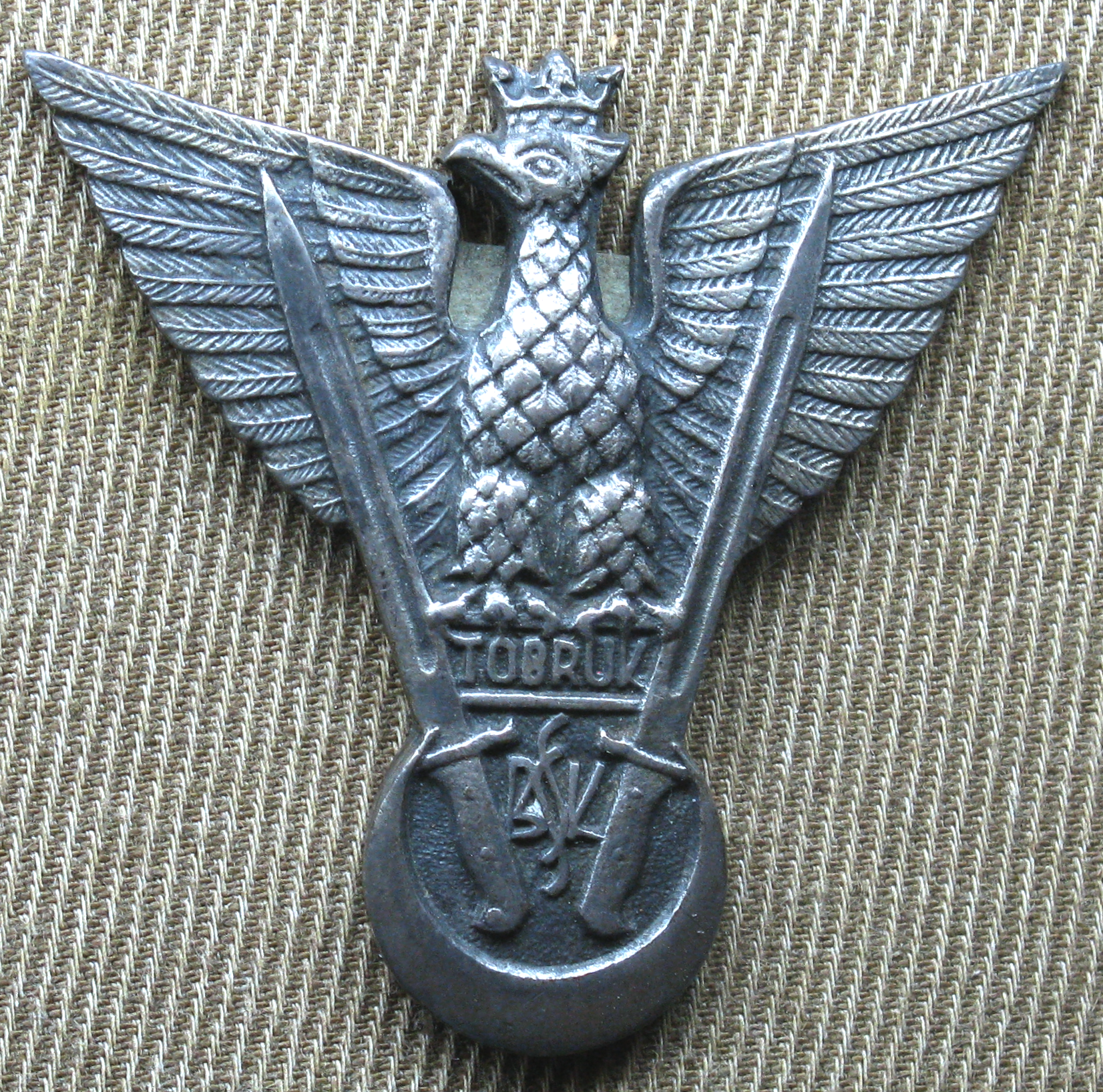
SBSK insignia

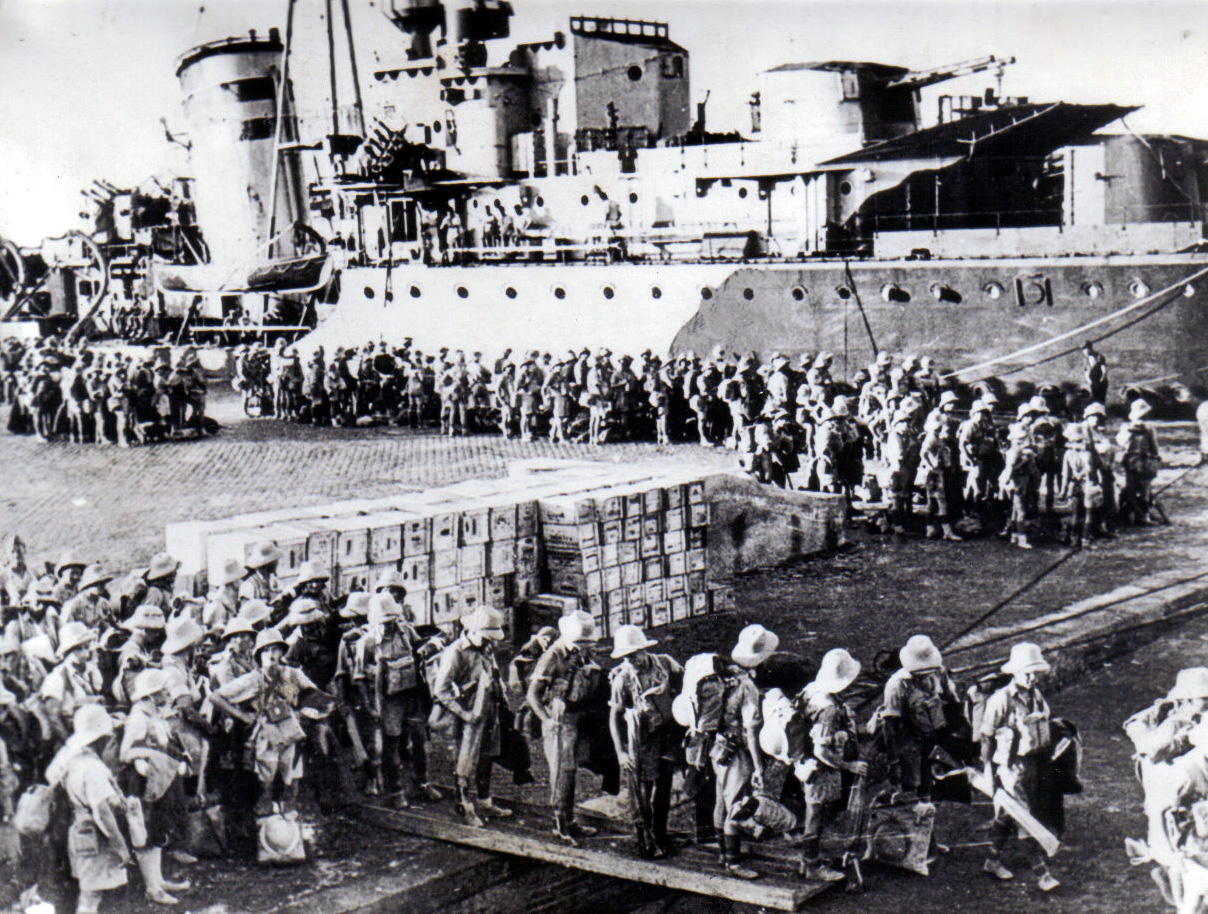
Upload of Polish Independent Carpathian Rifle Brigade in Alexandria for its trip to Tobruk

Polish Independent Carpathian Brigade (Polish Samodzielna Brygada Strzelców Karpackich, SBSK) was a Polish military unit formed in 1940 in French Syria composed of Polish soldiers exiled after the invasion of Poland in 1939 as part of the Polish Army in France. It was commanded by General Stanisław Kopański.

The division fought with distinction in the North African Campaign of World War II, notably during the Siege of Tobruk. In 1942 it formed the backbone of the 3rd Carpathian Rifle Division.

== History ==
In December 1939, three months after the invasion of Poland, the Polish Commander-in-chief, General Władysław Sikorski, decided that a Polish unit be created in the French territory of Levant . On 12 April 1940 the brigade was officially formed in Syria, with Colonel Kopański as its commander. The main base of the brigade was established in Homs and the new unit instantly entered the ranks of the French Armée du Levant. As a unit specializing in mountain warfare, the brigade was thought of as a Polish addition to Allied plans for landings in the Balkans. It was modelled after the standard French mountain infantry brigade, with 2 infantry regiments (of 2 battalions each), artillery regiment, reconnaissance regiment (mounted and motorized), signals, engineers and staff. Although new recruits arrived on a daily basis (mostly evacuated from Poland through Romania, Hungary, Greece and Yugoslavia), the brigade did not reach the planned numbers of 208 officers and 6840 soldiers and NCOs.

After the capitulation of France and the annulment of all of its pacts with Poland and the United Kingdom, the commander of the Armée du Levant General Eugène Mittelhauser decided to support the new Vichy government of Philippe Pétain, and Sikorski ordered the Poles to leave French territory. On 30 June 1940, the brigade defected to British-controlled Palestine, where it joined the British forces stationed there. Initially composed of 319 officers and 3,437 soldiers, it was soon reinforced to roughly 5,000 men. Among the distinctive features of the unit was the high morale of the soldiers, all of whom were volunteers. In addition, roughly 25% were well-educated, a thing uncommon in European armies of the time.

Based in Latrun, the brigade was equipped with British weapons, reinforced and trained. In October 1940 it was moved to Egypt, where it undertook garrison duties. Among other tasks, it guarded prisoner-of-war camps and prepared the fortification of Alexandria. However, as Poland was still formally at peace with Italy, it could not be sent to the front. On 12 January 1941, the reorganization of the brigade in keeping with British regulations was completed and the unit was renamed the Polish Independent Brigade Group. It was modelled on a British motorized infantry brigade and was then moved to the port of Haifa, from where it was to be transported to Greece. However, before the first of the detachments had been embarked on the ships, the Battle of Greece ended as the Germans overran that country.

On 30 April 1941, during the offensive of Erwin Rommel's Afrika Korps, the brigade was moved near to the front at the fort of Mersa Matruh, where it spent the next 10 weeks strengthening defensive positions. It was then withdrawn to the El Amiriya camp near Alexandria, and on 18 August 1941 the first convoy of the brigade's units left for besieged Tobruk. Transported in seven convoys, between 21 August and 28 August, the brigade took over the westernmost perimeter, relieving Australian troops in the process. Fighting alongside the British 70th Infantry Division, the brigade took part in the Siege of Tobruk. Overnight on 9 December, during the British Eighth Army's offensive, Operation Crusader, which was to raise the siege, the Polish brigade seized the strategically important Madauar Hill, the town of Acroma and broke through to the Eighth Army. Due to their impact on the battle, the Polish soldiers were awarded the prestigious title of the Rats of Tobruk by their Australian comrades in arms.

On 13 December the Carpathian Uhlan Regiment was detached while the remainder of the brigade was attached to XIII Corps of the Eighth Army and took part in the attack on the Axis Gazala defensive line on 15 December. Rommel made a fighting withdrawal to defensive positions around El Agheila but his counterattack on 21 January 1942 led to the armies once more facing each other at the Gazala position by early February. On 17 March 1942, the brigade was withdrawn from the front to the El Amiriya camp and then back to Palestine. There it was joined by the Polish forces of General Władysław Anders evacuated from the Soviet Union and was reformed into the 3rd Carpathian Rifle Division. The brigade officially ceased to exist on 3 May 1942.

Throughout its existence the brigade lost 156 killed in action (including 127 in the Siege of Tobruk), 467 wounded and 15 missing.

== Order of battle ==
=== 1941–1942 ===
The intended number of men at arms was 348 officers and 5326 soldiers and NCOs. However, the brigade did not reach it prior to being sent into battle. Each infantry battalion was composed of 4 rifle companies, each in turn composed of 3 rifle platoons and staff company (signals, AA, mortars, engineers and recce). The artillery initially composed of a mixture of French equipment and British Ordnance QF 18 pounder guns. By June 1941 all pieces of artillery were replaced with Ordnance QF 25 pounder. Despite the uniformity in equipping the artillery sub-units, they received the traditional Polish names of "Light Artillery", "Heavy Artillery" and "Mounted Artillery". Around that time also the anti-tank battalion was created, with 4 batteries, each consisting of 4 pieces of artillery.

- HQ (Gen. Stanisław Kopański)
  - Chief of Staff Lt. Col. Jerzy Zaremba, later Maj. Henryk Piątkowski
  - Commanding Officer of Infantry Col. Walenty Peszek
  - Quartermaster, Military Post Office, Military Police, Topography, Services
- 1st Battalion of Carpathian Rifles (Lt.Col. Stanisław Kopeć)
- 2nd Battalion of Carpathian Rifles (Maj. Antoni Michalik, then Maj. Jerzy Brzósko)
- 3rd Battalion of Carpathian Rifles (Lt.Col. Józef Sokol)
- Carpathian Artillery Regiment (Lt.Col. Stanisław Gliwicz)
  - 1st Light Artillery Battalion (Maj. Juliusz Możdżeń)
  - 2nd Heavy Artillery Battalion (Maj. Franciszek Kikal)
  - 3rd Mounted Artillery Battalion (Lt.Col. Emil Sikorski)
- Carpathian Anti-tank Artillery Battalion (Lt.Col. Antoni Cieszkowski)
- Carpathian Uhlans Regiment (Maj. Władysław Bobiński)
- Services:
  - sappers, signals

== See also ==
- Polish Armed Forces in the West
