= Roman Szymański =

Polish political activist, publicist, and editor

Roman Szymański (4 August 1840, Kostrzyn, Kingdom of Prussia – 18 December 1908, Poznań) was a Polish political activist, publicist, editor of Orędownik magazine.
