= Elias Childe =

British painter (1778–1849)

Elias Childe RBA (1778 – 1849) was a British landscape painter. He was a prolific artist, working both in oils and watercolours.

== Life ==
Born 1788, he was elder brother to the artist James Warren Childe and Henry Langdon Childe who developed the magic lantern. He first exhibited in 1798 at the Royal Academy, when he was living at 29 Compton Street, Soho, with his brother James. He concentrated on landscape, a field in which he was a success. In 1825 he was elected a fellow of the Society of British Artists.

Childe exhibited for the last time in 1848, and died in 1849.

== Works ==
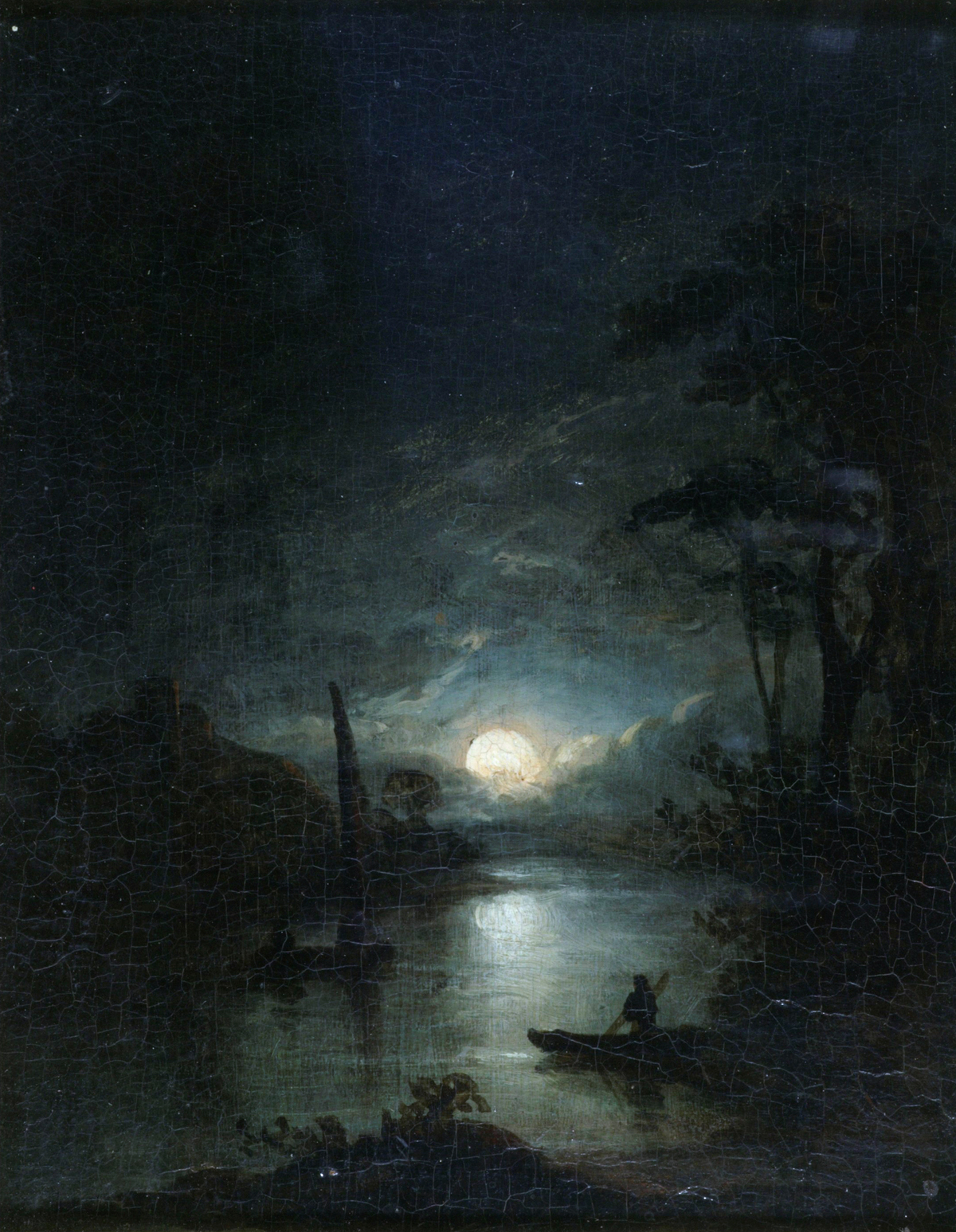
Moonlight: A Composition by Elias Childe

Childe exhibited upwards of 500 pictures at the exhibitions of the Society of British Artists, the Royal Academy, and the British Institution. His pictures were popular, and sold well. He particularly excelled in moonlight effects, and an example of that style went to the National Gallery of British Art at South Kensington.

== Notes ==
Attribution

This article incorporates text from a publication now in the public domain: Stephen, Leslie, ed. (1887). "Childe, Elias". Dictionary of National Biography. Vol. 10. London: Smith, Elder & Co.
