= Robert Child =

Robert Child may refer to:

- Robert Child (agriculturalist) (1613–1654), English physician, agriculturist and alchemist
- Sir Robert Child (Devizes MP) (1674–1721), English banker, Chairman of the East India Company 1715, Member of Parliament (MP) for Devizes 1713–15
- Robert Child (Wells MP) (1739–1782), English banker and politician, MP for Wells 1765–82

== See also ==
- Robert Childers (disambiguation)
