= Phoebe Child =

British educationist

Phoebe Child (12 May 1910–13 February 1990) was one of the pioneers of the Montessori Method of children's education and a co-founder of the Montessori World Educational Institute.

== Biography ==
Born in England, she first studied the Montessori approach with Maria Montessori in London in 1929. She then joined fellow students, Margaret Homfray, and Edna Andriano, in Italy to serve as English translators for the 1930 course in Rome. She, along with Margaret Homfray, continued to work with Montessori and later traveled with her to Ireland to translate her lectures in teacher training.

=== St. Nicholas Training Centre ===
In 1946, Montessori worked with Child and Homfray to start an English Montessori teacher training program, which later became the St. Nicholas Training Centre for the Montessori Method of Education. The training program eventually offered full-time residence training in two former embassy sites in Princes Gate in London, as well as a correspondence course.

Phoebe Child and Margaret Homfray served as co-principals for the training college for many years and trained thousands of Montessori teachers from all over the world. They also helped set up the St. Nicholas training center in Ireland and then went on to establish the Montessori World Educational Institute in the United States and Australia.
