= Henry Langdon Childe =

English showman (1781–1874)

Henry Langdon Childe (1781–1874) was an English showman, known as a developer of the magic lantern and dissolving views, a precursor of the dissolve in cinematic technique. While the priority question on the technical innovations Childe used is still debated, he established the use of double and triple lanterns for special theatrical effects, to the extent that the equipment involved became generally available through suppliers to other professionals. By the 1840s the "dissolving view", rooted in Gothic horror, had become a staple of illustrated talks with restrained animations.

== Early life ==
Childe was born in Poole, Dorset the youngest of three children. He and his wife Elizabeth had one daughter Maria. She is recorded in the 1851 census as an artist in glass, living in Lambeth with her parents.

== Development of lantern technique ==
Paul de Philipsthal used a magic lantern in London in 1802, for a phantasmagoria; he used effects such as animation of images, and a lantern on rails so that images could be changed in size. Childe reportedly worked for Philipsthal. He demonstrated his own magic lantern at the Sanspareil Theatre which was replaced by 1806, by the Adelphi Theatre.

The magic lantern had not advanced much from the 17th century to the latter part of the 18th century. Childe used achromatic lenses and an improved oil-lamp; and moved to the limelight, then associated with Thomas Drummond. The limelight has also been attributed to Robert Hare, and Goldsworthy Gurney. In Childe's hands, it increased the scale and brightness of the projected images at public performances.

It was the combination of the double image and the improved lighting that made the lantern technique standard for a time; credit for this advance in projection, underpinning "dissolving views" in practice, has been given to John Benjamin Dancer. The innovations of Childe and the instrument-maker Edward Marmaduke Clarke (the "biscenascope") played a part in displacing the diorama as a fashionable entertainment; it was a type of double lantern, but in fact had a single light source, divided by a mirror system.

Claims of priority were made on Childe's behalf, by 1885. On this account, repeated in the Dictionary of National Biography account of 1887, Childe innovated with his method of "dissolving views": one picture appeared to fade away, while another as gradually took its place, an effect created by two lanterns with shutters. He worked from 1807, and completed his method in 1818; a brother of the artist Elias Childe, he had learned while still a young man to paint on glass, and prepared his own lantern slides.

The date of the original introduction of dissolving views was the subject of an 1893 debate in The Optical and Magic Lantern Journal. At that point, the search for the earliest written reference to the technique was pushed back only to 1843, in the 25 March issue of the Magazine of Science. Later, a slightly earlier reference was found, to the 12 and 19 February issues during 1842 of The Mirror of Literature, Amusement, and Instruction. Childe had made a demonstration on 5 December 1840, at the Adelaide Gallery in London, before those at the Royal Polytechnic Institution the following year.

== Early career with the lantern ==
It remains unclear what Childe himself invented, and when, but according to some sources his technique became established in British theatres in the 1820s and 1830s: the lantern was used as a heightened dramatic effect and supported "transformation scenes". In 1827, a production of The Flying Dutchman opera by Edward Fitzball projected an image of the ship from backstage onto gauze. Childe has been credited with this moving image effect. Fitzball himself, however, took the credit at the time, for the use of a lantern on a track.

In the phantasmagoria tradition, which continued to be popular with British audiences of the early 19th century, Childe showed Castle Spectre within a Gothic setting in 1828. The Literary Gazette of 27 March 1830 reported on Childe's support of a popular scientific lecturer.

== Mainstream performer ==
After the opening of the London Colosseum, Childe was a frequent exhibitor there. Princess Victoria with her mother attended Childe's entertainment of dissolving views at the Adelphi. During Lent of the years 1837–40 Childe was engaged with his lanterns to illustrate a series of lectures on astronomy given at Her Majesty's Theatre. At the Royal Polytechnic Institution, the building was opened with his "grand phantasmagoria" in 1838. It was here that he developed the "chromatrope", consisting of two painted circles of glass that revolved in opposite directions. It was introduced about 1843–4.

== Later life ==
Childe's lantern exhibitions in Manchester and most of the large provincial towns were successful. He and his associates took part in the management of the Royal Polytechnic Institution, until it closed in 1882. On 1 January 1863 the Illustrated London News reported on a lantern production of Cinderella at the Polytechnic, in which Childe was involved in painting slides, after designs of Henry George Hine. W. R. Hill (1823–1901) was Childe's apprentice in the slide painting art; he moved on in 1867 to work for John Henry Pepper of the Polytechnic. A surviving lantern slide of Hill's has dimensions 17 cm (6.7 in) by 21 cm (8.3 in), larger than was standard. The Polytechnic's slides were professionally painted, by a group including also Charles Gogin, Isaac Knott, and Fid Page.

Childe lived to age 93, dying in 1874.

== Notes ==
Attribution

This article incorporates text from a publication now in the public domain: Stephen, Leslie, ed. (1887). "Childe, Henry Langdon". Dictionary of National Biography. Vol. 10. London: Smith, Elder & Co.
