= Cross of Independence =

Cross of Independence Krzyż Niepodległości
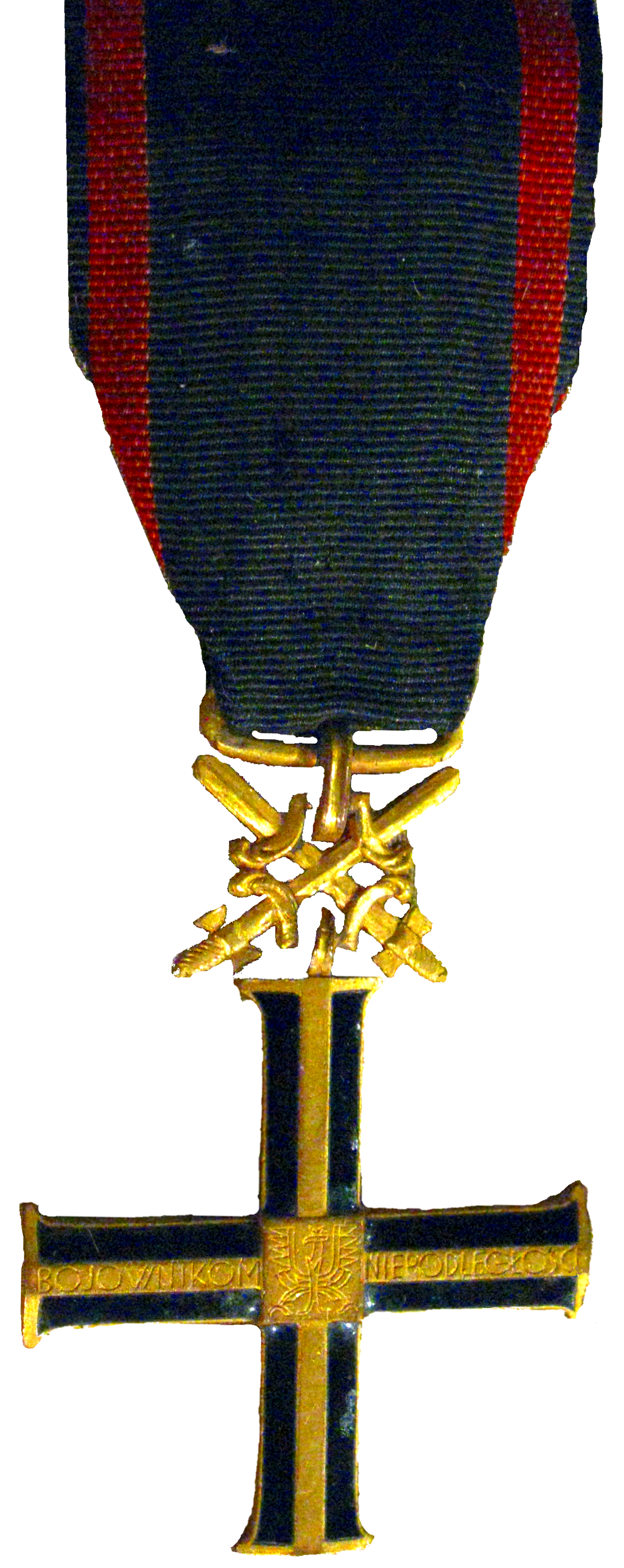
- Cross of Independence with Swords
- Awarded for: Heroically fighting for the independence of Poland
- Country: Second Polish Republic
- Presented by: the President of Poland
- Status: Obsolete
- Established: 29 October 1930

Highlights
- Total: Cross with Swords 1818; Cross 7917; Medal 51,735
- Ribbon bar of the Cross with Swords Ribbon bar of the Cross and Medal

Precedence
- Next (higher): Order of Polonia Restituta
- Next (lower): Cross of Valour
- Related: Order of the Cross of Independence; Cross of Freedom and Solidarity

Cross of Independence (Polish: Krzyż Niepodległości) was the second highest Polish military decoration between World Wars I and II. It was awarded to individuals who had fought actively for the independence of Poland, and was released in three classes.

== History ==
The Cross of Independence was established with a decree of the President of Poland of 29 October 1930. It was to be awarded to the people who laid foundations for the independence of the Fatherland before the World War or during it, as well as during the fights between 1818 and 1921, with the exception of the Polish-Russian War. After 1938 it was also awarded to people responsible for Trans-Olza's annexation by Poland.

Although the cross without the swords was awarded mainly to the civilians, all versions were considered to be military decorations. If awarded to a soldier it was worn before the 4th class of the Polonia Restituta and when awarded to a civilian – before the Volunteer Cross for War (Medal Ochotniczy za Wojnę).

The recipients of all grades of the Cross of Independence had a right to be elected to the Senate of Poland, the right to travel by Polish State Railways free of charge and a right to send their children to the schools of their choice free of charge.

== Design ==
Both the Cross and the Medal were designed by professor Mieczysław Kotarbiński and most of the copies were made by Warsaw-based jeweller Wiktor Gontarczyk.

The Cross of Independence had three classes:

1. Cross of Independence with Swords (1,818 awarded by 1938)
2. Cross of Independence (7,917 awarded by 1938)
3. Medal of Independence (51,735 awarded all together)

The cross was 42 by 42 mm, made of gilt bronze. The obverse had a rectangle shield with stylised eagle in bas-relief. The reverse was covered with black enamel and the motto Bojownikom Niepodległości (To the Fighters for Independence). The version with Swords had two golden swords crossed above the cross.

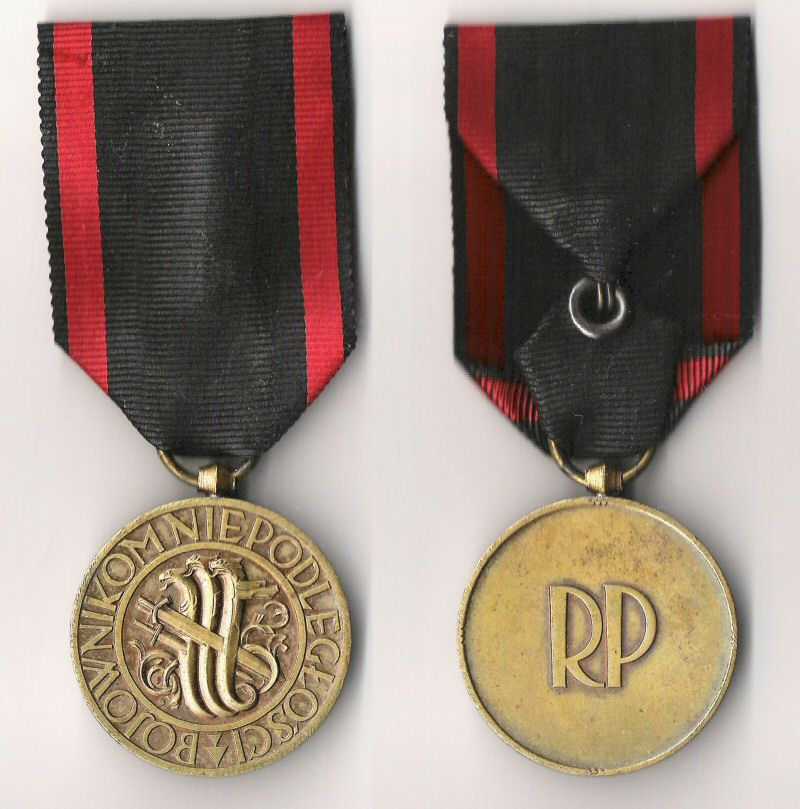
Medal of Independence

Medal of Independence was round, 35 mm in diameter and made entirely of bronze. On the obverse there was a symbolic depiction of three Hydras (symbolising three partitioning Powers) stroke with two swords and surrounded by the Bojownikom Niepodległości motto. The reverse was plain with letters RP in the centre (standing for Rzeczpospolita Polska).

== Recipients ==
- Józefa Bramowska
- Witold Abramowicz (politician)
- Franciszek Alter
- Tadeusz Anders
- Władysław Anders
- Julian Arnoldt-Russocki
- Franciszka Arnsztajnowa
- Edward Abramowski
- Stefan Kaczmarz
- Emil Rauer
- Andrezj Przeworski
- Władysław Leon Osmolski
