= Karol Anders =

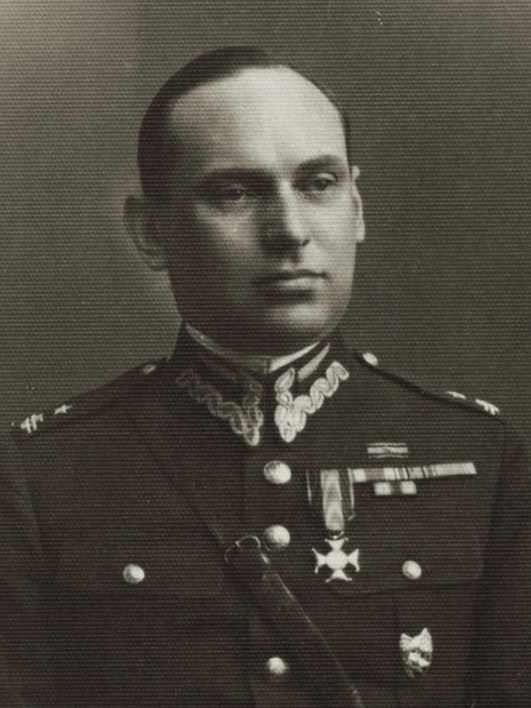
- Major Karol Anders
- Born: 8 September 1893; Krośniewice-Błonie, Congress Poland, Russian Empire
- Died: 4 July 1971 (aged 77); Penley, Wales, United Kingdom
- Burial place: Welford Road Cemetery, Leicester, England
- Spouse: Jadwiga née Chłopicka
- Relatives: Władysław Anders, Tadeusz Anders
- Military career
- Allegiance: Poland
- Branch: Polish Army, Polish II Corps
- Service years: 1912–1947
- Rank: Podpułkownik (Lieutenant colonel)
- Unit: 1st Krechowice Uhlan Regiment
- Commands: 1st Krechowice Uhlan Regiment, 2nd Grochowski Uhlan Regiment
- Conflicts: World War I; Polish–Soviet War; World War II; Invasion of Poland; Battle of Kock
- Awards

Karol Anders (8 September 1893 – 4 July 1971) was a Lieutenant colonel in the cavalry of the Polish Army, brother of Lt. General Władysław Anders and Colonel Tadeusz Anders, and double recipient of Poland's Virtuti Militari – IV and V Class.

== Youth ==
Karol Anders was born in Błonie, Kingdom of Poland – a village located approximately one kilometre north of Krośniewice. He was the son of Albert Anders – a German Balt, and Elżbieta née Tauchert. Karol was the middle son of the Anders family; Władysław was a year older than Karol, and Tadeusz was almost nine years younger. The Anders family was of German ancestry and Evangelical faith; Albert Anders' ancestors had settled in Poland in the first half of the 18th Century.

Karol Anders was a student at a Realschule in Warsaw before transferring to the Trade School in Kaunas. At 19, he entered the Imperial Russian Army as a one-year volunteer in Autumn 1912. He was stationed at the 3rd Uhlan Regiment in Vilkaviškis, Suvalkija. In 1913, Karol worked as an apprentice at his father's farm.

== 1914–1939 ==
Karol Anders was mobilized by the Russian Army on 1 August 1914 following the outbreak of World War I. In November 1917, he was assigned to the 1st Krechowce Uhlan Regiment. The 1st Krechowice was one of several units making up the 1st Polish Corps of the Russian Army led by General Józef Dowbor-Muśnicki.

In July 1918, the First Polish Corps was disarmed and demobilised. Karol travelled to Warsaw and, on 1 September 1918, set out towards Kielce where the 1st Uhlan Regiment of the newly formed Polish Army was being formed. He served in the 1st Uhlan Regiment during the Polish–Soviet War.

On 29 May 1920, Karol was severely wounded during the charge at the Battle of Wołodarka. On 17 October 1920, he was severely wounded again during the battle in the Olyka Region. For his bravery, he was awarded the Virtuti Militari with Silver Cross. After the Polish–Soviet War, Karol remained in the 1st Uhlan Regiment until 31 December 1924.

He was transferred to the Cavalry Training Center in Grudziądz in January 1925. He was assigned to the 2nd Regiment of Grochów Uhlans, stationed in Suwałki in May 1928, and was appointed Assistant Commander. In October 1931, he was assigned Assistant Commander of the 25th Greater Poland Uhlan Regiment stationed in Prużany. In June 1933, he was appointed Regional Horse Inspector of the Cavalry in Ciechanów. In 1938, he returned to Augustów as Assistant Commander of the 1st Krechowice Uhlan Regiment.

== World War II ==
At the onset of the September Campaign, Karol served as the Assistant Commander in the 1st Krechowice Uhlan Regiment until 9 September. Between 9 and 12 September, he served as the Commander of the 2nd Grochowski Uhlan Regiment. From 12 September to the end of military operations on 6 October, Anders served as the Commander of the 1st Krechowice Uhlan Regiment. The 1st Krechowice was incorporated in situ into the Cavalry Brigade "Edward". "Edward" help protect an evacuation corridor stretching from Suvalki to Lublin. "Edward" – along with the 1st Krechowice with Karol at the head, was forced to retreat and protect the Romanian Bridgehead in late September. Between 2 and 5 October the remnants of "Edward" fought at the Battle of Kock. After the lost battle and lost defensive campaign, Karol was interned at the Oflag VII-A Murnau prisoner-of-war camp. Karol's younger brother – Tadeusz, was an adjutant in the 4th Mounted Artillery Division incorporated into the Cavalry Brigade "Edward", and participated alongside Karol throughout most of the latter half of the September Campaign. Unlike his brother, Tadeusz successfully evaded capture and fled to France.

Karol was awarded the Virtuti Militari 4th Class for his leadership during the September Campaign.

== Post-War Life ==
After being liberated from the Murnau POW Camp, Karol Anders travelled to Italy in May 1945. He enlisted in the II Polish Corps led by his older brother Władysław. He was appointed Assistant Commander of the 16th Pomeranian Infantry Brigade of the II Polish Corps. The II Polish Corps was transferred to Great Britain, where it demobilised in 1947. After the war he resided in Great Britain for the remainder of his life, marrying Jadwiga née Chłopicka. Karol Anders died on 4 July 1971 in Penley, and was laid to rest at the Welford Road Cemetery in Leicester. His wife died in 1987.

== Promotions ==
- Rotmistrz (Captain) - 1 June 1919
- Major (Major) - 1 December 1924
- Podpułkownik (Lieutenant colonel) - 19 March 1937

== Awards and decorations ==
- Gold Cross of Virtuti Militari
- Silver Cross of Virtuti Militari (1921)
- Cross of Valour (three times)
- Gold Cross of Merit (11 November 1937)
- Wound Decoration
- Inter-Allied Victory Medal
