= Tadeusz Anders =

Army Officer

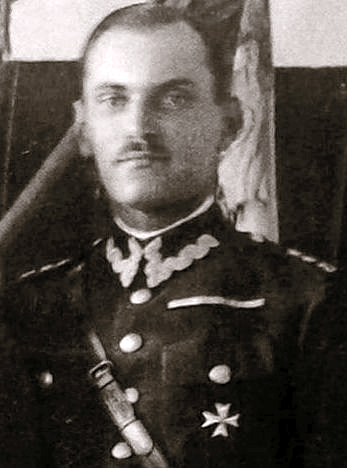
- Born: Tadeusz Konstanty Anders; June 12, 1902; Krośniewice-Błonie, Congress Poland, Russian Empire
- Died: July 7, 1995 (aged 93); New York City, United States
- Burial place: Our Lady of Czestochowa Cemetery
- Relatives: Władysław Anders; Karol Anders
- Military career
- Allegiance: Poland
- Branch: Polish Army
- Service years: 1918-1946/47
- Rank: podpułkownik (lt. col)
- Units: 15th Poznań Uhlans Regiment, II Corps
- Conflicts: Polish–Soviet War Third Silesian Uprising; September Campaign: Battle of Kock
- Awards: Virtuti Militari (V Class) Cross of Independence Cross of Valour Silver Cross of Merit Cross on Silesian Ribbon for Bravery and Merit

Tadeusz Konstanty Anders served as a captain artillery officer in the Polish Army during the Interbellum Period, and as a podpułkownik (lt. col) in the Polish Armed Forces during World War II. He was awarded the Virtuti Militari V Class, Poland's highest military decoration for heroism and courage in the face of the enemy at war.

== Biography ==
=== Early life ===
Tadeusz Anders was born on June 7, 1902, in the village Błonie, Kingdom of Poland, located approximately one kilometer north of Krośniewice. Tadeusz was the third and youngest son of Albert Anders, a German Balt and Elżbieta Anders née Tauchert, and the brother of Władysław and Karol. The Anders family was of German descent and Evangelical faith; Albert Anders' ancestors had settled in Poland in the first half of the 18th Century.

=== Military career ===
By the age of 16, Tadeusz Anders joined the Polish Military Organisation and served in the vicinity of Mińsk Litewski in 1918. From September 1919, he was stationed in Modlin as part of the II Cadet Corpus. With the onset of the Polish–Soviet War, Anders served in the 15th Poznań Uhlans Regiment, only to be transferred to Silesia in May 1921 to participate in the Third Silesian Uprising.

Upon completion of his Matura on June 25, 1922, Anders entered the Field Artillery Officers' School in Toruń. On July 1, 1923, he advanced to the rank of podporucznik (the equivalent of Junior Lieutenant) while being assigned to the 29th Light Artillery Regiment. Two years later on July 1, 1925, he was promoted to porucznik (Lieutenant).

After his promotion in 1925, Anders was transferred to the 11th Mounted Artillery Division. From 1931 to 1934, he served as an instructor in the Reserve Officers' Cadet School in Włodzimierz Wołyński. On January 1, 1934, he was promoted to captain. Afterwards, he was transferred to Suwałki, where he served as an adjutant in the 4th Mounted Artillery Division.

=== World War II ===
Anders remained at the 4th Mounted Artillery Division in Suwałki until the beginning of the September Campaign, where the 4th Mounted Artillery Division was incorporated in situ into the Cavalry Brigade "Edward". Apart from the 4th Mounted Artillery Division, Cavalry Brigade "Edward" also consisted of the 3rd Masovian Light Cavalry Regiment, the 3rd Mounted Infantry Regiment, and the 1st Uhlan Regiment, which was commanded by Tadeusz's older brother, Karol Anders, who then held the rank of podpułkownik (Lieutenant Colonel). The brigade was tasked with the protection of the defensive corridor formed between the Suwałki and Lublin regions. During the September Campaign, the brigade retreated south to protect the Romanian Bridgehead. Both Anders brothers, along with the rest of brigade, participated in the Battle of Kock.

At the conclusion of the September Campaign, Tadeusz Anders evaded capture. He made his way to France and joined Sikorski's Army. Next, he made his way to the II Polish Corps, which was led by his eldest brother, Władysław. There, Tadeusz was appointed commander of the 7th Mounted Artillery Regiment. In December 1944, the 7th Mounted Artillery Regiment was regrouped into the 7th Self-Propelled Artillery Regiment and he was appointed commander of the new regiment. While serving in the 7th Self-Propelled Artillery Regiment, Anders was promoted first to major, and then to podpułkownik (Lieutenant Colonel).

By the end of World War II, the II Polish Corps was transferred to Great Britain. Shortly thereafter, Anders emigrated to the United States. He died on July 7, 1995, in New York City. He was laid to rest at the National Shrine of Our Lady of Czestochowa, located near Doylestown, Pennsylvania. His tomb can be found at the cemetery dedicated to the Polish Veterans of World War II.

== Family ==
His brothers were Karol Anders and Lt. General Władysław Anders, the latter being the commander of the Polish II Corps.

== Bibliography ==
- (in Polish) Personal acts collection no. 154/012 at the Piłsudski Institute of America
