= Władysław Anders =

Polish general (1892–1970)

Lieutenant general Władysław Anders
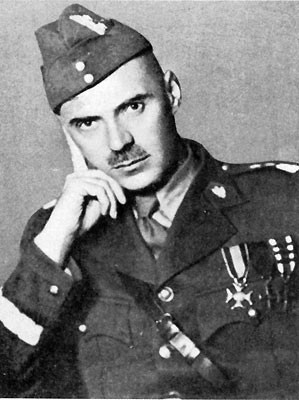
- Born: Władysław Albert Anders; 11 August 1892; Krośniewice-Błonie, Warsaw Governorate, Congress Poland, Russian Empire
- Died: 12 May 1970 (aged 77); London, United Kingdom
- Spouses: Irena Maria Anders (Jordan-Krąkowska); Irena Anders
- Relatives: Tadeusz Anders; Karol Anders
- Military career
- Allegiance: Russian Empire; Second Polish Republic; Polish Government in exile
- Service years: 1913–1946
- Rank: Lieutenant General (Polish: Generał Broni)
- Unit: Polish II Corps
- Conflicts: First World War; Polish–Soviet War; Second World War; Invasion of Poland; Battle of Tomaszów Lubelski; Battle of Wladypol; Italian campaign; Battle of Monte Cassino; Battle of Ancona; Battle of Bologna
- Awards: See list below

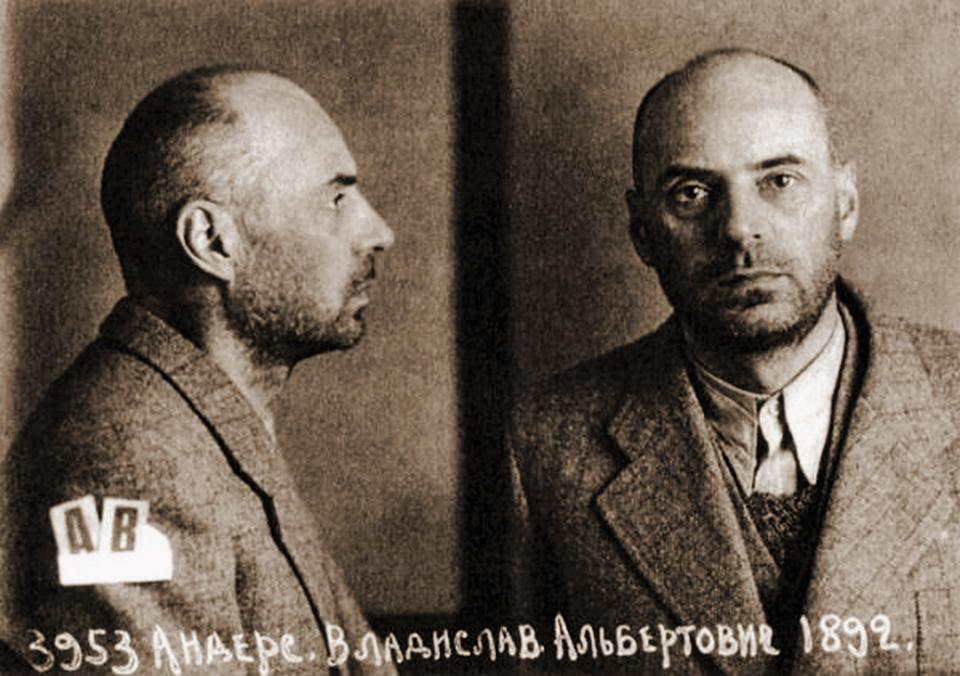
Mug shot made by the secret police of the Soviet Union (NKVD) after his arrest in 1940

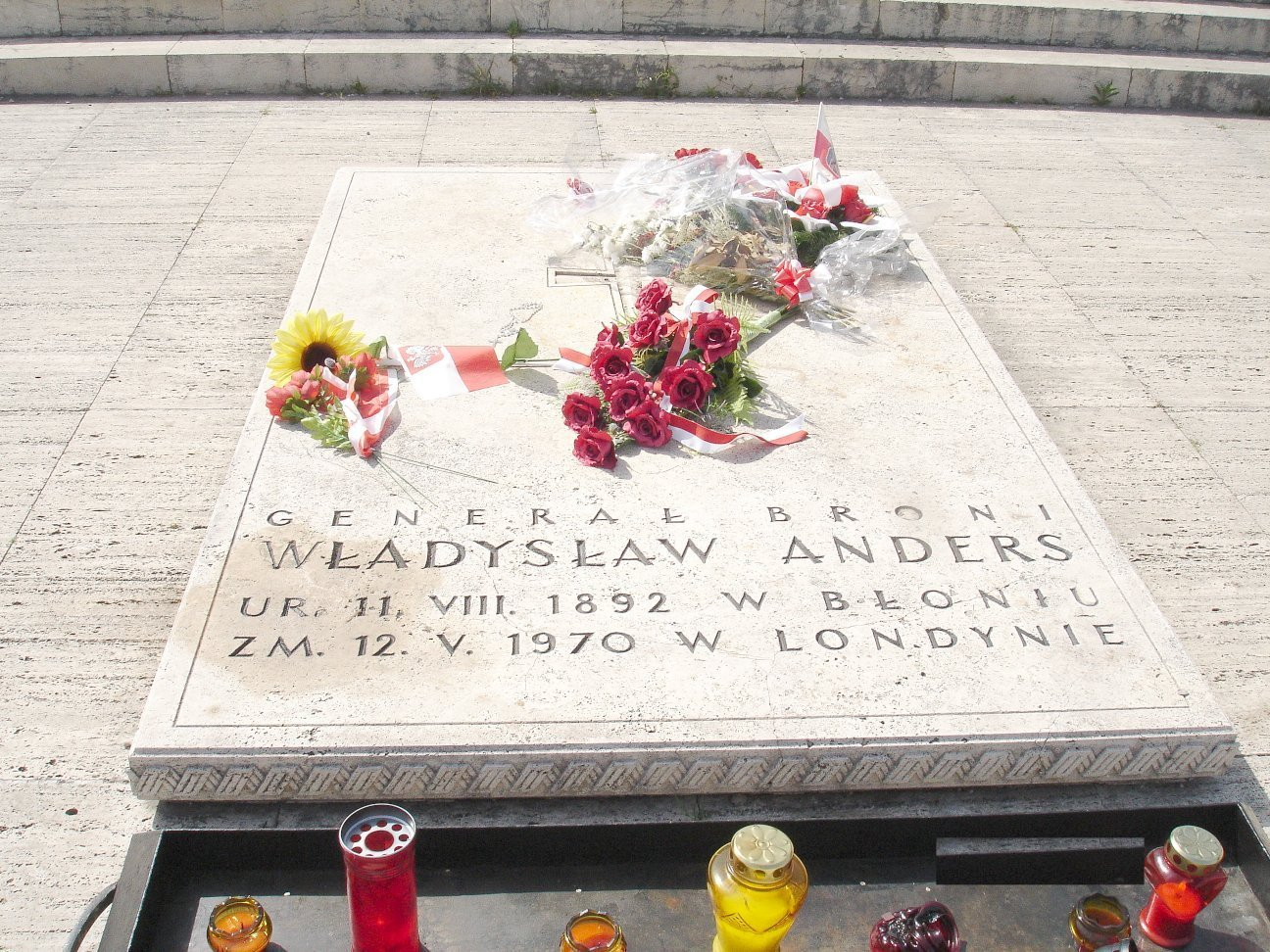
The tombstone of General Anders at the Polish War Cemetery at Monte Cassino in Italy.

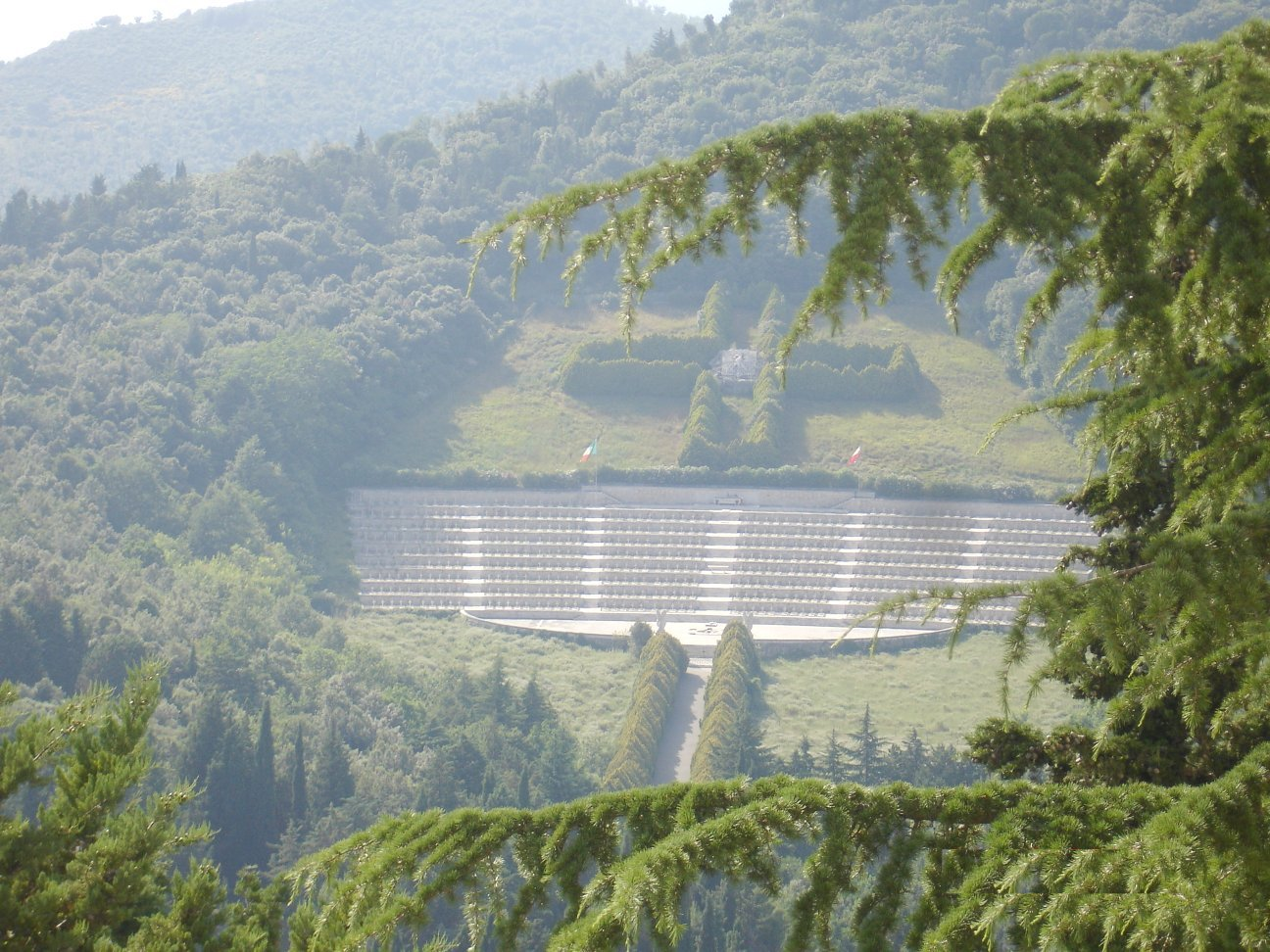
The Polish War Cemetery at Monte Cassino in Italy.

Władysław Albert Anders (Polish: [vwaˈdɘ.swaf ˈan.dɛrs]; 11 August 1892 – 12 May 1970) was a Polish military officer and politician, and a prominent member of the Polish government-in-exile in London.

Born in Krośniewice-Błonie, then part of the Russian Empire, he served in the Imperial Russian Army during World War I and later joined the Polish Land Forces after Poland regained its independence in 1918.

During World War II, Anders was captured by Soviet forces and imprisoned, but he was later released to form a Polish Army to fight against the Germans alongside the Red Army. He led the Polish II Corps throughout the Italian campaign, including the capture of Monte Cassino.

After the war, Anders was deprived of his citizenship and military rank by the Soviet-installed communist government of Poland. He remained in Britain, working for the Polish government in exile and various charities. In 1989, after the collapse of communist rule in Poland, his citizenship and military rank were posthumously reinstated.

== Biography ==
=== Before World War II ===
Anders was born on 11 August 1892 to his father, Albert Anders, and mother, Elżbieta (née Tauchert), in the village of Krośniewice–Błonie, 96 kilometres (60 mi) west of Warsaw, then part of the Russian Empire. Both his parents were of Baltic German origin and had been polonized long before his birth. He was baptised as a member of the Protestant Evangelical-Augsburg Church in Poland. He had three brothers – Karol, Tadeusz and Jerzy, all of whom also went on to pursue careers in the military.

Anders attended a technical high school in Warsaw and later studied at Riga Technical University, where he became a member of the Polish student fraternity Arkonia. After graduation, Anders was accepted into a Russian Military School for reserve officers. As a young officer, he served in the 1st Krechowiecki Lancers Regiment of the Imperial Russian Army during World War I.

When Poland regained its independence in November 1918, Anders joined the newly formed Polish Land Forces. During the Polish–Soviet War of 1919–1921, he commanded the 15th Poznań Uhlans Regiment and was awarded the Silver Cross of the Virtuti Militari. After the war, Anders continued his military education in France at the École spéciale militaire de Saint-Cyr, and upon graduation he returned to Poland, where he served on the general staff of the Polish Army under General Tadeusz Rozwadowski, Chief of the General Staff from 1920 to 1921.

Anders opposed Józef Piłsudski's May Coup in Poland in 1926, but unlike Rozwadowski, he avoided persecution by the Sanation regime that assumed power after the coup. Piłsudski made him the commander of a cavalry brigade in 1931 and he was promoted to the rank of general three years later.

=== World War II ===
Anders commanded the Nowogródzka Cavalry Brigade during the German invasion of Poland in September 1939 and was immediately called into action, taking part in the Battle of Mława. After the collapse of the Polish Northern Front the brigade withdrew towards Warsaw, and also fought heavy battles against the Germans around Mińsk Mazowiecki and in the second phase of the Battle of Tomaszów Lubelski. After learning about the Soviet invasion of Poland, Anders retreated south in the direction of Lwów, hoping to reach the Hungarian or Romanian border, but was intercepted by Soviet forces and captured on 29 September, after being wounded twice.

Anders was initially jailed in Lwów and subsequently transferred to the Lubyanka prison in Moscow on 29 February 1940. During his imprisonment, he was interrogated, tortured and unsuccessfully urged to join the Red Army.

After the launch of Operation Barbarossa and the signing of the Sikorski-Maisky agreement, Anders was released by the Soviets with the aim of forming a Polish Army to fight against the Germans alongside the Red Army. Continued friction with the Soviets over political issues as well as shortages of weapons, food and clothing, led to the eventual evacuation of Anders' men – known as Anders' Army – together with a sizeable contingent of Polish civilians who had been deported to the USSR from Soviet-occupied Poland, via the Persian Corridor into Iran, Iraq, and finally into Mandatory Palestine. The evacuation, which took place in March 1942, was based on the British-Soviet-Polish understanding. The soldiers involved were evacuated from the Soviet Union and made their way through Iran to British-ruled Palestine, where they passed under British command. Here, Anders formed and led the Polish II Corps, while continuing to agitate for the release of Polish nationals still in the Soviet Union.

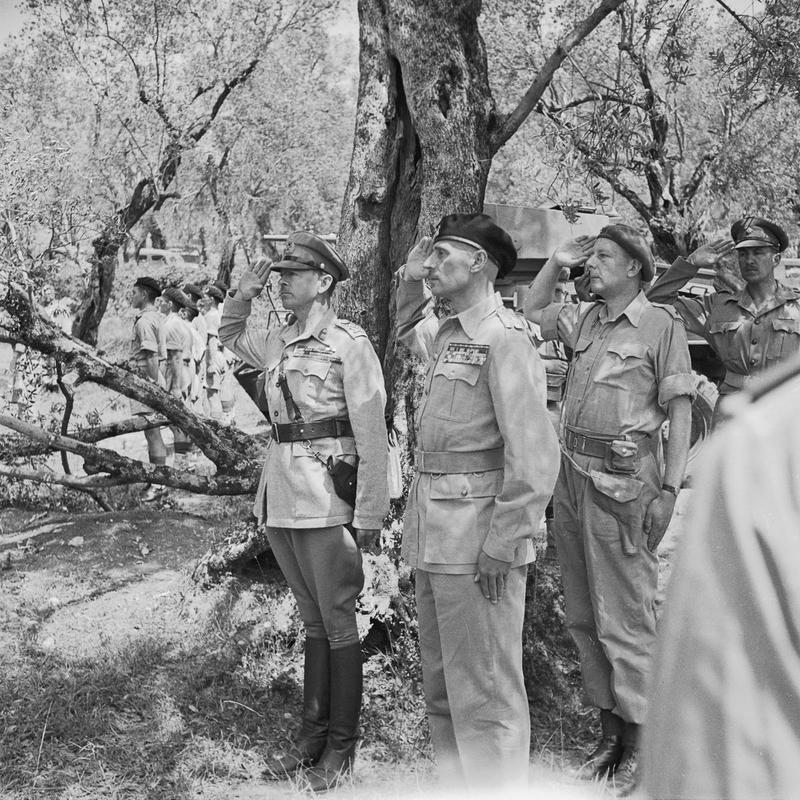
General Władysław Anders and the Commander of the Allied Armies in Italy, General Harold Alexander salute, after Alexander had invested Anders with the Order of the Bath in recognition of Polish services at Monte Cassino. Lieutenant Eugeniusz Lubomirski, Anders' adjutant, is standing behind his commander

The Polish II Corps became a major tactical and operational unit of the Polish Armed Forces in the West. Anders commanded the Corps throughout the Italian Campaign, capturing Monte Cassino on 18 May 1944, Ancona on 18 July 1944; afterward his Corps took part in the breaking of the Gothic Line and in the final spring offensive.

The morale of the Polish forces was weakened by the outcome of the Yalta Conference which ended on 11 February 1945, where Winston Churchill and Franklin D. Roosevelt, without consulting the Polish government-in-exile, accepted Soviet control over a major part of the 1921–1939 Polish territories. When Anders asked for his unit to be withdrawn from the front line, Churchill replied "you are no longer needed" though the Allied commanders Richard McCreery, Mark Wayne Clark and Harold Alexander requested Anders to order his units remain in their positions, as they had no troops to replace them. Anders eventually decided to keep the Polish units engaged, and they subsequently fought in the Battle of Bologna.

=== After World War II ===
After the war, the Soviet-installed communist government of Poland deprived him of Polish citizenship and of his military rank. Anders had, however, always been unwilling to return to a Soviet-dominated Poland where he probably would have been jailed and possibly executed, and remained in Britain. He was prominent in the Polish Government in Exile in London and became General Inspector of the Armed Forces, as well as working on behalf of various charities and welfare organisations. His book about his experiences during the Second World War, An Army in Exile, was first published by MacMillan & Co, London, in 1949.

Władysław Anders in 1969 at the commemoration of the 25th anniversary of the Battle of Monte Cassino in Italy

Anders died in London on 12 May 1970, where his body lay in state at St Andrew Bobola Church, and many of his former soldiers and their families came to pay their last respects. He was buried, in accordance with his wishes, amongst his fallen soldiers from the 2nd Polish Corps at the Polish War Cemetery at Monte Cassino in Italy. After the collapse of communist rule in Poland in 1989, his citizenship and military rank were posthumously reinstated.

Many personal effects which once belonged to Anders are on display in the Polish Institute and Sikorski Museum in London. In June 2021, General Anders's bust designed by Andrzej Pitynski was officially unveiled at London's National Army Museum.

=== Private life ===
Anders was married twice. He had two children with his first wife Irena Maria Jordan-Krąkowska.

In 1948, he married the actress and singer Irena Jarosiewicz, better known under her stage name Renata Bogdańska, with whom he had a daughter, Anna Maria.

== Medals ==
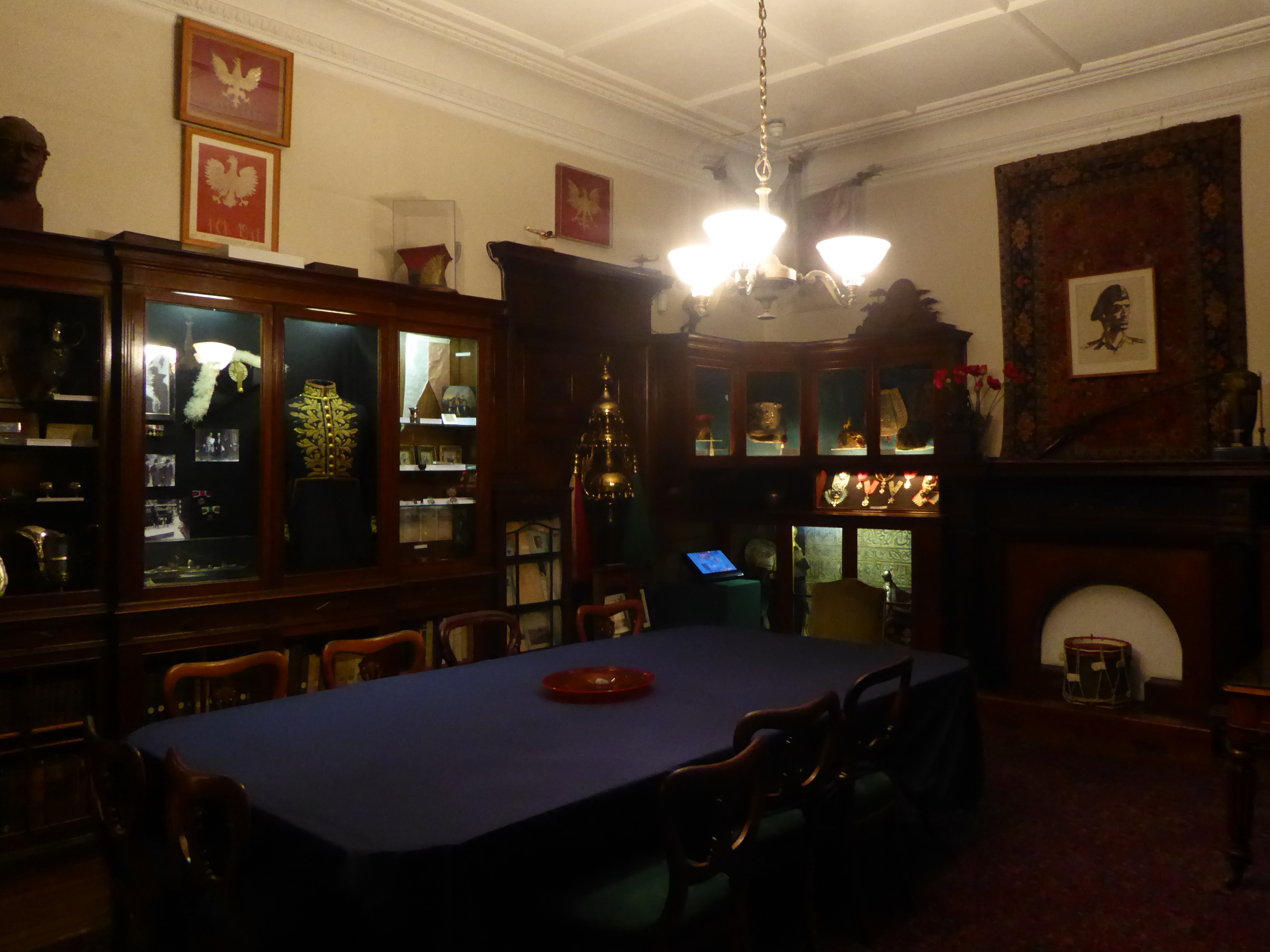
The Władysław Anders room in the Polish Institute and Sikorski Museum, London

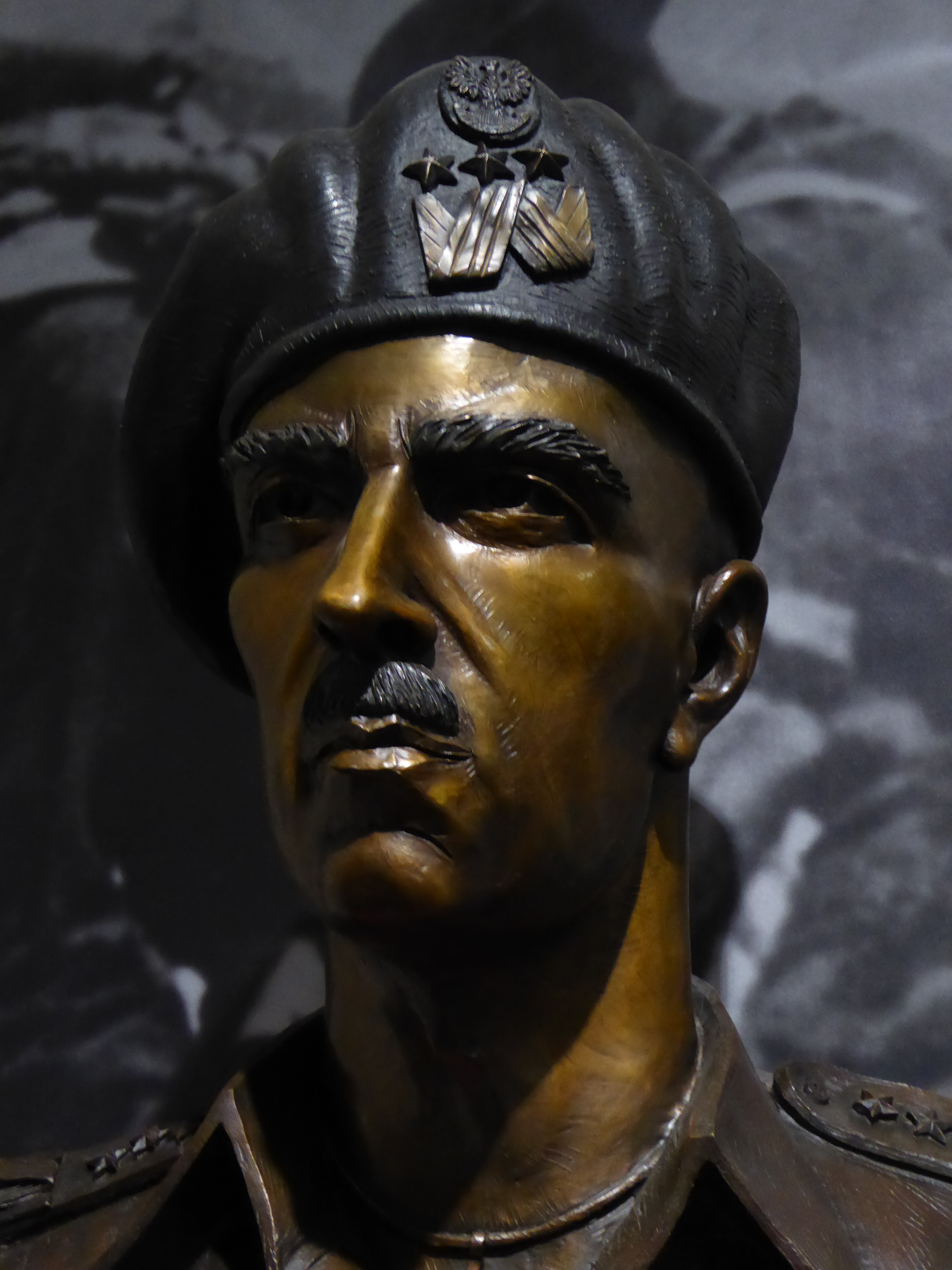
A bust of Władysław Anders in the Polish Army Museum in Warsaw

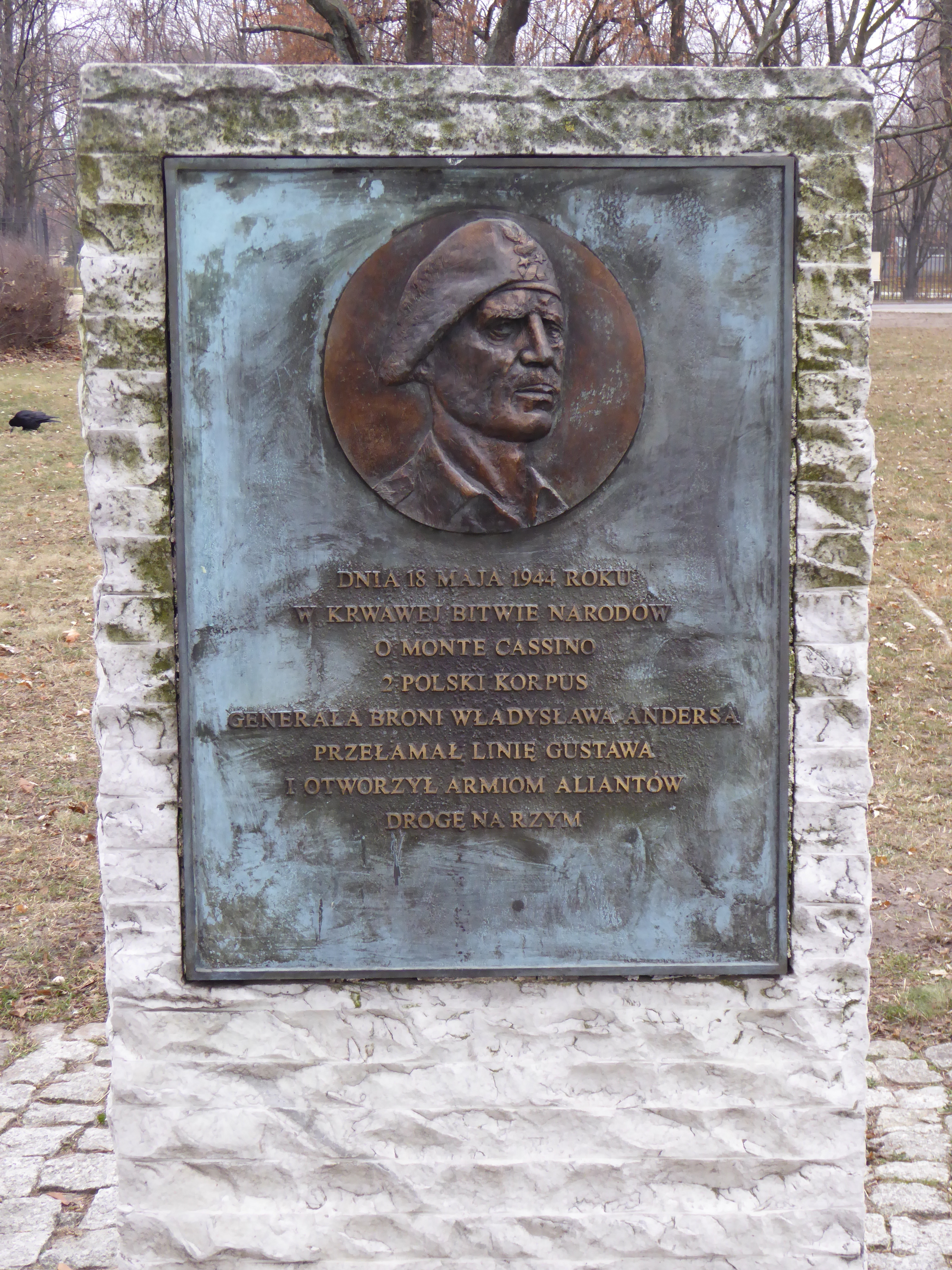
Anders pictured on the Monument to the Battle of Monte Cassino in Warsaw

Anders received numerous awards and decorations:

=== Poland ===
- Order of the White Eagle (awarded posthumously on 11 November 1995 by Lech Wałęsa)
- Virtuti Militari
  - Commander's Cross (2nd class)
  - Knight's Cross (3rd class)
  - Golden Cross (4th class)
  - Silver Cross (5th class)
- Order of Polonia Restituta
  - Commander's Cross (3rd class)
  - Officer's Cross (4th class)
- Cross of Independence
- Cross of Valour (four times: Polish–Soviet War (3) & Invasion of Poland)
- Gold Cross of Merit with Swords (four times)
- Army Medal (four times)
- Commemorative Medal for War 1918–1921
- Medal of the 10th Anniversary of Independence
- Medal of 3rd May
- Medal for Long Service
  - Silver (20 years)
  - Bronze (10 years)
- Home Army Cross
- Monte Cassino Commemorative Cross
- Wound Decoration, (eight times)

=== Foreign ===
Czechoslovakia

- Order of the White Lion

France

- Commander of the Légion d'honneur
- Croix de Guerre avec Palme
- Médaille Interalliée de la Victoire 1914–1918

Italy

- Order of Saints Maurice and Lazarus (1st class)
- War Cross for Military Valor

The Sovereign Military Order of Malta

- Grand Cross of Merit

Persia

- Order of Homayoun (1st class)

Imperial Russia

- Order of St. George (4th class, 1915)
- Order of St. Vladimir with Swords (4th class, 1915)
- Order of St. Anna with Swords (2nd, 3rd (1918) and 4th class)
- Order of Saint Stanislas with Swords (2nd and 3rd classes, 1918)

United Kingdom

- Honorary Companion of the Order of the Bath
- 1939–1945 Star
- Italy Star
- Defence Medal
- War Medal

United States of America

- Commander of the Legion of Merit
- Order of Lafayette

Kingdom of Yugoslavia

- Commander of the Order of St. Sava

== See also ==
- List of Poles
- Anders' Army
- Anders (tank)
- History of Poland (1939–45)
- Polish Armed Forces in the East
- Polish Armed Forces in the West
- Polish contribution to World War II
- Polish government-in-exile
- Western betrayal
- WPB Anders

== Notes ==
Military offices
Preceded by none	Commanding General of the Polish II Corps; 1943–1945	Succeeded by Zygmunt Bohusz-Szyszko
Preceded by Tadeusz Bór-Komorowski	General Inspector of the Armed Forces; 1946–1954	Succeeded by Michał Karaszewicz-Tokarzewski
Political offices
Preceded by none	Member of the Council of Three; Alongside: Tomasz Arciszewski, Edward Raczyński, Tadeusz Bór-Komorowski, Roman Odzierzyński, Stanisław Mglej, Alfred Urbański; 1954–1970	Succeeded by Stanisław Kopański
