= Józefa Bramowska =

Poland politician (1860–1942)

Józefa Zofia Bramowska Batschów
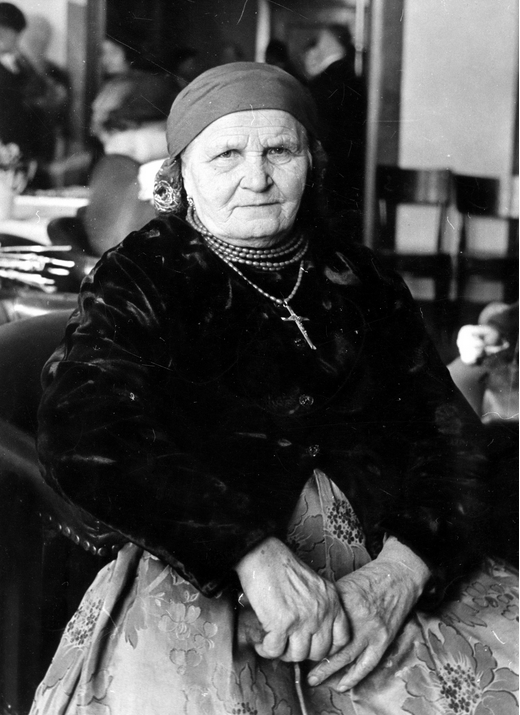
- Born: March 10, 1860; Żyglin, in the city of Miasteczko Śląskie
- Died: October 4, 1942 (aged 82); Żyglin
- Citizenship: Poland
- Occupation: Politician
- Known for: Polish culture in Silesia

Józefa Zofia Bramowska (née Batschów; March 10, 1860 – October 4, 1942) was a promoter of Polishness in Silesia, and senator of the Republic of Poland in 1929–1930 and in 1935.

== Early life and career ==
Jozéfa was born in Żyglin on March 10, 1860, into the family of Tomasz Batsch, a farmer, and Barbara née Przybyłków. She completed four classes at a primary school in Żyglin. After her father's death at the age of eighteen, she started working in the ore mine in Pasieki (now Bibiela). In 1891, she married Piotr Bramowski. She ran a farm in the village of Żyglin in Tarnowskie Góry county (now Miasteczko Śląskie).

In 1909, she founded the Society of Polish Women in Żyglin. She promoted Polish newspapers and Polish readership and gave patriotic speeches, for which she was imprisoned several times by the German authorities. She participated in the plebiscite in Upper Silesia and in the Third Silesian Uprising, nding her apartment as a weapons warehouse and underground premises.

From 1927 on, she was the chairwoman of the Main Board of the Society of Polish Women in Silesia. She was also a member of the National Organization of Women.

She ran in the 1928 elections on behalf of the National Christian Labor Union, but she took over the mandate only in 1929 after the death of Józef Londzin. She also became a senator for the third term in 1935, after resigning from the mandate by Jan Kołłątaj-Srzednicki.

After the start of World War II, she evacuated to the east, but on September 29, 1939, she returned to Żyglin. She died on October 24, 1942, in Żyglin.

== Orders and awards ==
- Cross of Independence (September 13, 1933)
- Officer's Cross of the Order of Polonia Restituta
- Cross of the Order of Polonia Restituta (November 10, 1928)
- Golden Cross of Merit (April 22, 1939)
- Silver Cross of Merit

=== Commemoration ===
She is one of the 30 heroes of the exhibition entitled "60 x 100 Neighborhoods." The Voice of Women about Silesian Uprisings and the Plebiscite" is devoted to the role of women in Silesian uprisings and the plebiscite action (2019). The concept of the exhibition and materials were prepared by Małgorzata Tkacz-Janik, with graphics by Marta Frej.
