= Władysław Leon Osmolski =

Polish physician and military officer (1883–1935)

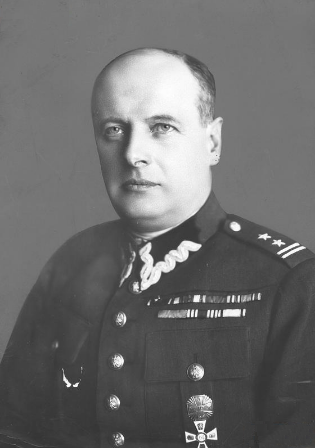
- Lieutenant Colonel Władysław Leon Osmolski (photograph taken between 1926 and 1929)
- Born: June 28, 1883; Warsaw, Poland
- Died: April 6, 1935 (aged 51); Świebodzin, Poland
- Occupation: Physician
- Awards: Cross of Independence; Officer's Cross of the Order of Polonia Restituta; Cross of Valour (four times); Gold Cross of Merit; Swedish Order of Vasa (Knight 1st Class); Swedish Order of Vasa (Commander 1st Class); Romanian Meritul Sanitar Order; Czechoslovak Order of the White Lion

Władysław Leon Piotr Osmolski (28 June 1883 – 6 April 1935) was a Polish physician, physical education theorist, and military officer who served as a lieutenant colonel in the Polish Armed Forces. He was the commandant of the Central Military School of Gymnastics and Sports in Poznań, director of the Central Institute of Physical Education in Warsaw, and a publicist, independence activist, and sports advocate.

== Biography ==
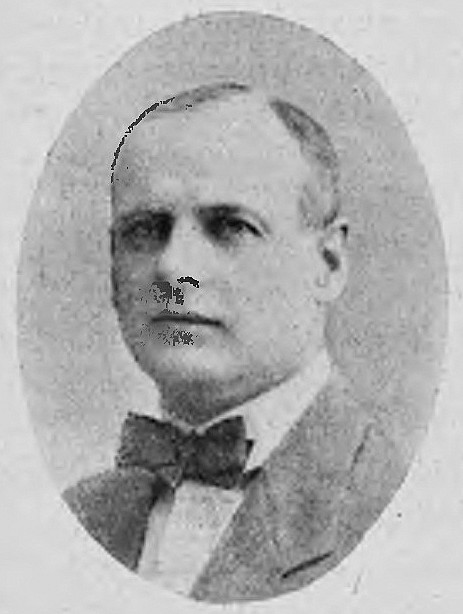
Władysław Osmolski, c. 1924

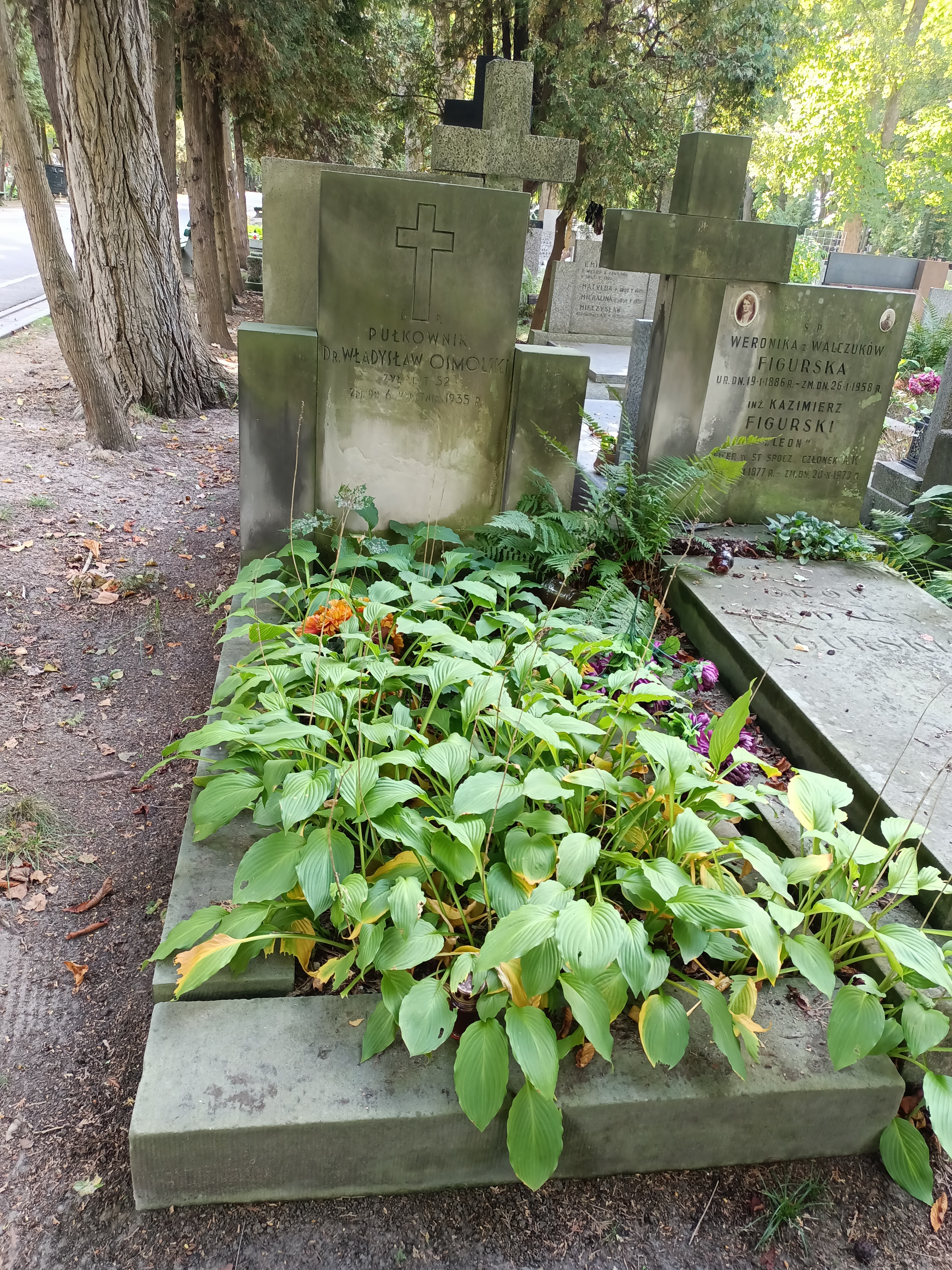
Grave of Władysław Osmolski at the Powązki Military Cemetery

Born in Warsaw to Władysław Osmolski and Maria Japowicz, he completed his secondary education at the V Government Philological Gymnasium in Warsaw. He began medical studies at the Faculty of Medicine of the Imperial University of Warsaw. Expelled in 1905 for participating in a school strike, he continued his studies at the Jagiellonian University in Kraków, earning his medical degree from the University of Dorpat in 1907.

=== Medical career ===
Osmolski began his professional career in Warsaw, later working in the Ushitsa uezd and Odesa at the Bacteriological Institute. He was sent by the Russian government to Arabia, where he served for two years in a plague quarantine under the International Commission for Combating Plague. After publishing Przyczynek do anatomii patologicznej moru (Contribution to the Pathological Anatomy of the Plague) in Gazeta Lekarska, he joined the Warsaw Medical Society in 1911. He worked under Franciszek Kijewski in surgery and as an assistant to Walenty Kamocki at the Ophthalmic Institute, specializing in ophthalmology from 1912 to 1920. During this period, he also contributed to the hygiene movement as a physician in Wilhelm Rau's gardens. He earned his doctorate in medical sciences from the Jagiellonian University in 1922.

=== Military career ===
Osmolski began his military service as a regimental doctor in the Imperial Russian Army during World War I. On 2 August 1915, he deserted near Łomża to join the Polish Military Organisation. On 4 August 1915, he became a commissioner of the Civic Guard in the XII District, serving until its dissolution. He served as chief physician of the Warsaw District from 1916 to 1918 and, from 11 November 1918, as a physician for the 36th Infantry Regiment.

During the Polish-Soviet War, he was promoted to captain in 1920. After the war, as chief sanitary officer of the 2nd Army, he was demobilized but later recalled. On 3 May 1922, he was verified as a lieutenant colonel with seniority from 1 June 1919, ranking 70th among sanitary officers. In June 1922, he was appointed head of the Physical Education Department of the General Staff's Third Branch, while remaining an extra-regimental officer of the 1st Sanitary Battalion.

From 1926 to 1929, he commanded the Central Military School of Gymnastics and Sports in Poznań. He initiated the establishment of the Central Institute of Physical Education in Warsaw, serving as its first director and lecturer from 1929 to 1931. In 1931, he became commandant of the Sanitary Cadet School at the Sanitary Training Centre (1931–1933), lecturing simultaneously at the Vilnius University. He later served as chief sanitary officer of the VII Corps District in Poznań. On 18 February 1930, he was promoted to colonel with seniority from 1 January 1930, ranking first among sanitary officers (physicians).

=== Social and educational activities ===
Osmolski taught at schools and delivered lectures at early aviation courses. He authored the first regulations on hygiene and physical education, including Nauczanie higieny w szkole elementarnej oraz seminarium nauczycielskim (Teaching Hygiene in Elementary Schools and Teacher Seminars). From 15 January 1918, he worked in the Ministry of Religious Affairs and Public Education as a hygiene consultant and served as vice-president of the Council for Physical Education and Physical Culture until 1922.

He headed the Physical Education Section at the Polish General Exhibition in Poznań, chaired the organizing committee of the First Sports Congress in Warsaw (1923), served as president of the Polish Ski Association, and was the first president of the Sports Journalists' Association. In 1924, he led the Polish delegation at the 1924 Winter Olympics in Chamonix. In 1925, dissatisfied with the management of Legia Warsaw, he founded the rival military sports club Lechia Warsaw at the same address and facilities, which inadvertently revitalized Legia.

He lectured at the Central Military School of Gymnastics and Sports in Poznań and the University of Warsaw. Osmolski died on 6 April 1935 near Świebodzin during a trip to the Republic of Liberia at the invitation of its government. He was buried at the Powązki Military Cemetery in Warsaw.

== Views ==
Osmolski emphasized the educational value of competitive sports and advocated for their accessibility to youth. He viewed physical activities as a training ground for social participation. He promoted a balanced approach to physical education, condemning its commercialization and advocating for its ethical role. His theory of motor efficiency, grounded in a holistic understanding of human development, was implemented at the Central Institute of Physical Education and aligned with government policies limiting state responsibility in this area. His progressive views on education are widely recognized.

== Legacy and contributions ==
Osmolski was a pioneer of sports medicine, a promoter of physical culture, and a co-founder of the Polish Olympic Committee and the Medical Publishing Society. An expert in tropical diseases, he authored over 110 publications in journals such as Lekarz Polski, Nowiny Lecznictwa Farmaceutycznego i Fizykalnego, Przegląd Fizjologii Ruchu, Przegląd Sportowo-Lekarski, Warszawskie Czasopismo Lekarskie, Wychowanie Fizyczne w Szkole, and Wychowanie Sportowe i Wojskowe. He was the publisher and editor-in-chief of the weekly Stadion, a member of the editorial committee of Wychowanie Fizyczne i Zdrowotne, and editor of Lekarz Wojskowy.

== Awards and decorations ==
- Cross of Independence
- Officer's Cross of the Order of Polonia Restituta (2 May 1923)
- Cross of Valour (four times)
- Gold Cross of Merit
- Swedish Order of Vasa (Knight 1st Class)
- Swedish Order of Vasa (Commander 1st Class, 1931)
- Romanian Meritul Sanitar Order
- Czechoslovak Order of the White Lion

== Publications ==
- Przyczynek do anatomii patologicznej moru (Contribution to the Pathological Anatomy of the Plague, 1911)
- Hygiena sportu (Sports Hygiene, 1917, co-edited with T. Heryng, M. Arct Publishing, Warsaw)
- Hygiena w harcerstwie (Hygiene in Scouting, 1918, M. Arct Publishing, Warsaw)
- Lekka atletyka (Light Athletics, 1920)
- Operowanie woreczka łzawego ropiejącego (Surgery of the Suppurating Lacrimal Sac, 1922)
- Wpływ nauk lekarskich na doktrynę wychowania fizycznego (Influence of Medical Sciences on the Doctrine of Physical Education)
- Rola sportu w wychowaniu etycznym (The Role of Sports in Ethical Education, 1922, Biblioteka Eugeniczna Polskiego Towarzystwa Walki Ze Zwyrodnieniem Rasy, No. 1)
- Stosunek sportu do wychowania fizycznego (The Relationship of Sports to Physical Education, Lekarz Wojskowy, 1926)
- Zaniedbane drogi wychowawcze (Neglected Educational Pathways, 1928)
- Zdrowie, opieka społeczna, wychowanie fizyczne i sport (Health, Social Welfare, Physical Education, and Sports)
- Budowa terenów i urządzeń sportowych (Construction of Sports Fields and Facilities, 1928, co-edited with Henryk Jeziorowski, Main Military Bookstore, Warsaw)
- Biologiczne znaczenie ćwiczeń fizycznych (Biological Significance of Physical Exercises, Nowiny Lekarskie, 1931)
- Psychofizjologia rozwoju sprawności ruchowej (Psychophysiology of Motor Efficiency Development, 1931)
- Biologiczne wytłumaczenie popędów sportowych (Biological Explanation of Sports Drives, 1932)
- O studiach specjalizujących lekarzy sportowych (On Specialized Training for Sports Physicians)
- Wychowanie fizyczne w Polsce (Physical Education in Poland, Tętno, 1932)
- O wychowawczym znaczeniu zabawy (On the Educational Significance of Play)
- Teorja sprawności ruchowej (Theory of Motor Efficiency, 1935, Nasza Księgarnia, Warsaw)
- Podstawy biologiczne ćwiczeń ruchowych (Biological Foundations of Physical Exercises, in Medycyna sportowa (Sports Medicine), 1935)
