= 15th Poznań Uhlan Regiment =

15 Pułk Ułanów Poznańskich
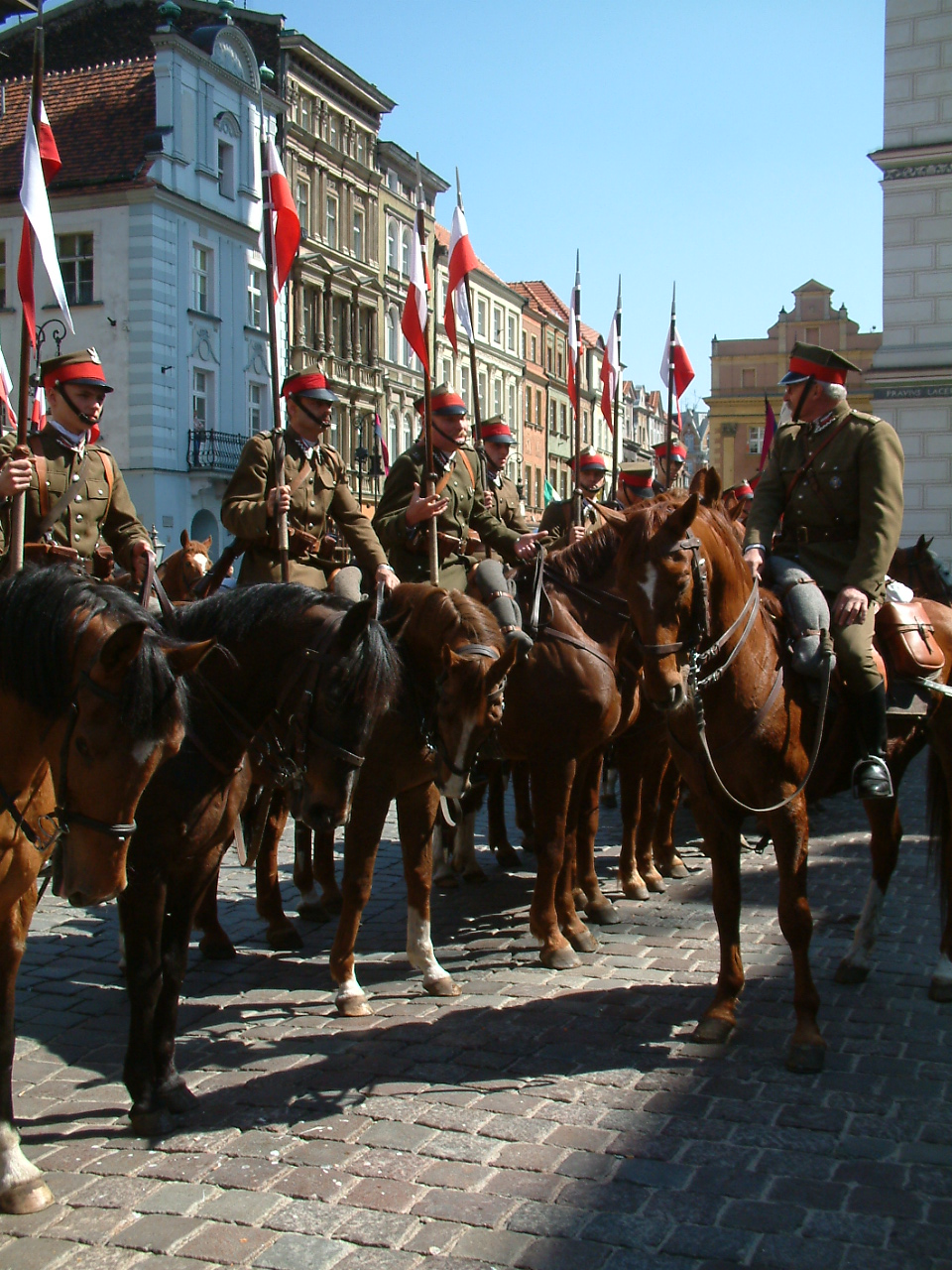
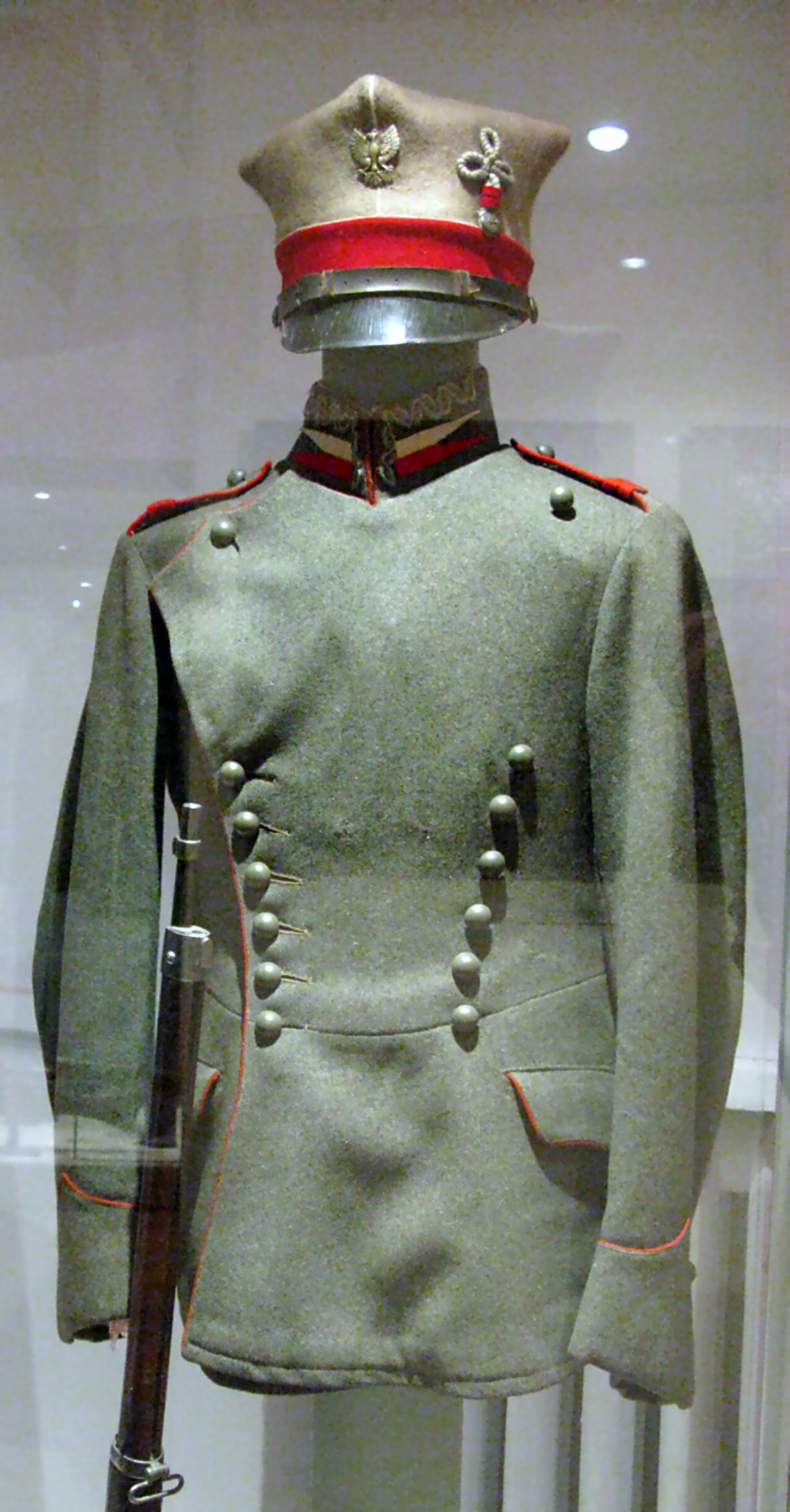
- LEFT:Volunteer Representative Uhlans Unit of City of Poznań in uniforms of 15th Regiment; RIGHT:Kurtka and czapka of lance corporal of 1st Greater Poland Uhlans Reg.
- Active: 1918-1939, 1942-1947
- Country: Poland
- Branch: Land forces
- Type: Cavalry, Mounted Infantry, Mechanized Infantry, Armoured
- Garrison/HQ: Poznań
- Nicknames: Rogate, czerwone czorty (Horned, red devils)
- Colors: white and red
- Anniversaries: 23 April
- Engagements: Greater Poland Uprising (1918-1919), Polish-Soviet War, September Campaign, Italian Campaign (World War II)

Commanders
- Ceremonial chief: President of City of Poznań, Jacek Jaśkowiak
- Notable commanders: Władysław Anders, Stanisław Grzmot-Skotnicki

Insignia
- Pennant

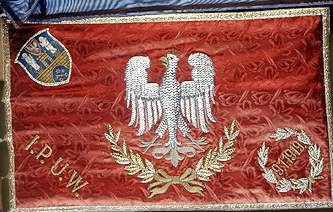
- Regimental colours of 15th Poznań Uhlans Reg. (reverse)

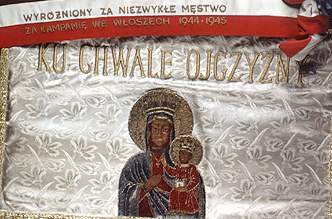
Regimental colours of 15th Poznań Uhlans Reg.

15th Poznań Uhlan Regiment (Polish: 15 Pułk Ułanów Poznańskich; 15 puł) was a Polish cavalry unit, part of Greater Poland's Army, the Polish Army (Second Republic) and the Polish Armed Forces in the West during World War II.

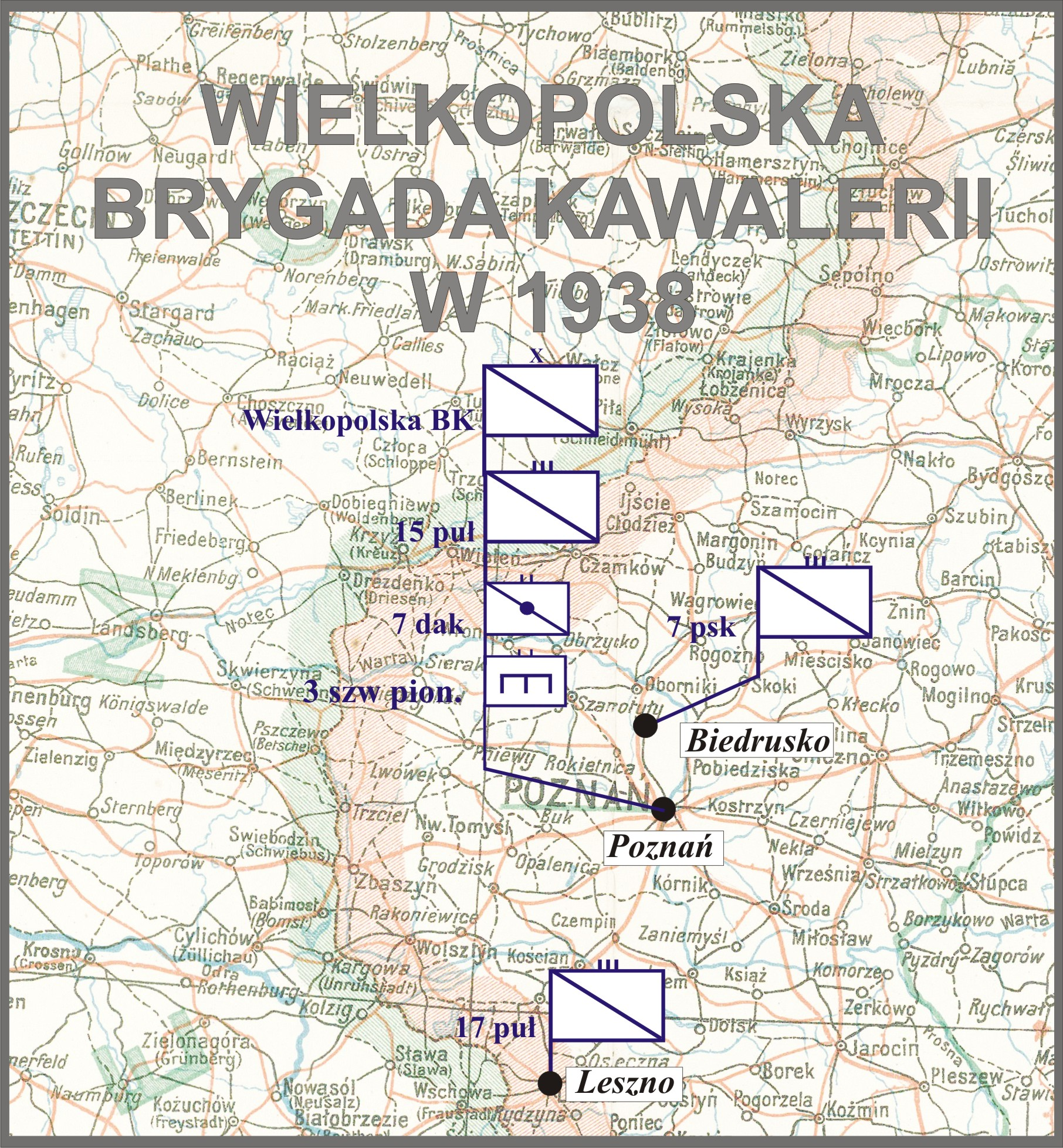
Wielkopolska BK w 1938

== Regimental colours ==
The Regimental colours were founded by females from the Poznań society Ognisko Żołnierza Polskiego. The regiment received the colours from the hands of Gen. Józef Dowbor-Muśnicki in Poznań on 29 July 1919. Although Colours were irregular to Polish Army military code, the standard was used for all the time of the regiment's existence during the interbellum. During the occupation, the standard was kept in the Visitationist Church in Warsaw. The nuns, after the assassination of Franz Kutschera, cut off the image of the Holy Mother and burned the rest of the standard. The standard was reconstructed, with usage of parts of previous colours in 1960. Currently, the Standard is kept in Greater Polands Military Museum in Poznań.

== History and traditions ==
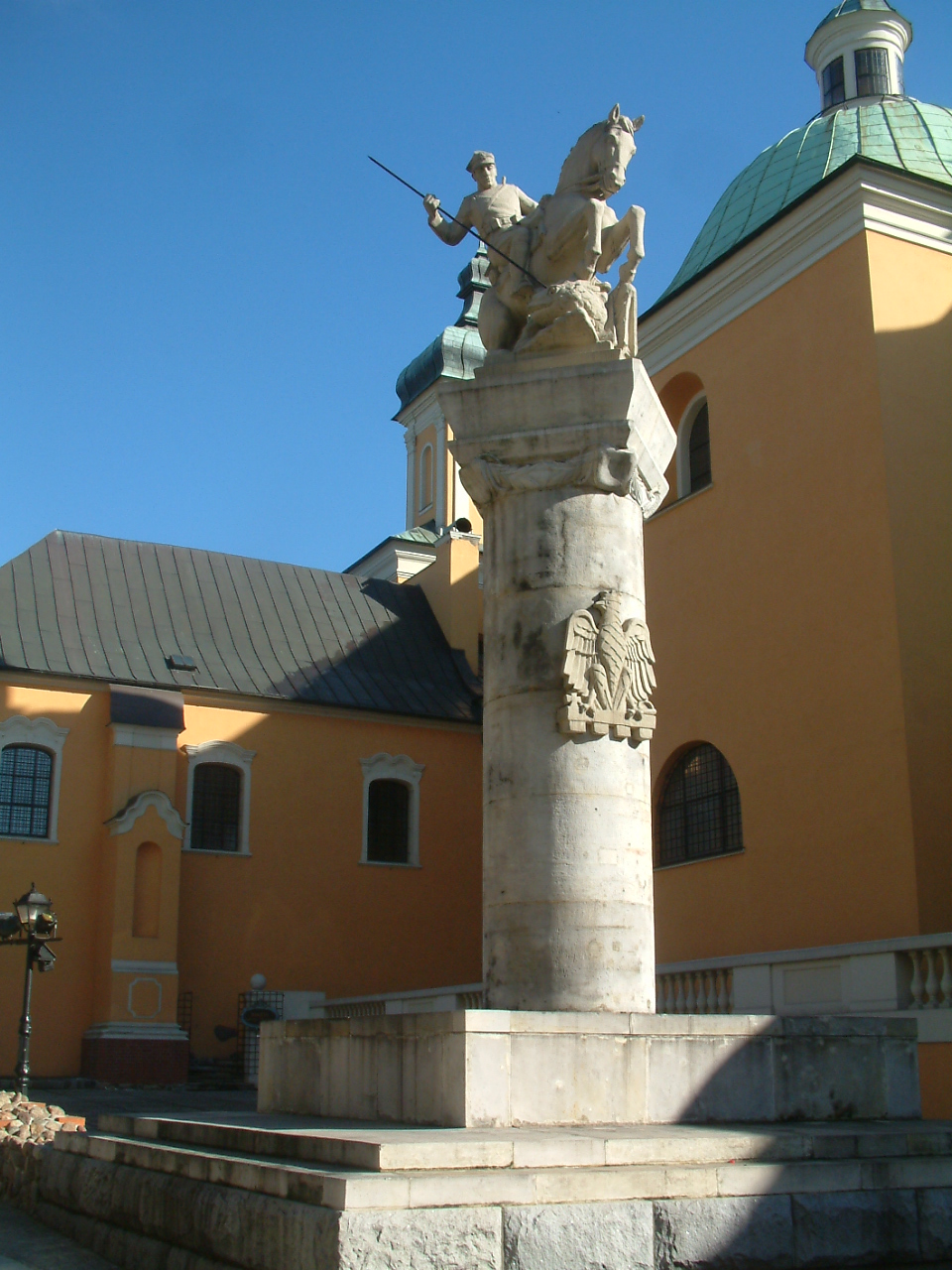
Monument of Poznań Uhlans by Mieczysław Lubelski

The 15th Uhlans Regiment was first formed as a part of the Army of the Duchy of Warsaw. Later, during the November Uprising, volunteers from the Prussian partition created the Poznań Cavalry Regiment (Polish: Pułk Jazdy Poznańskiej). Close to the west wall of the St Anthony of Padua's Church is a monument of the 15th Poznań Uhlan Regiment.

=== World War I and post-war period ===
Regiment of uhlans that appeals to those units was created on 30 December 1918 during the Greater Poland Uprising (1918–1919) as Mounted Rifleman of Poznań Guard (Polish: Konni Strzelcy Straży Poznania) with 2nd Lt. Kazimierz Ciążyński as first commander. The national colours, white and red were adopted as the colours for the unit pennants. On 14 January 1919, 2nd Lt. Józef Lossow replaced Ciążyński as temporary commander. Soldiers took a military oath on 26 January 1919 as the 1st Greater Poland Mounted Rifleman Regiment (Polish: 1 Pułk Strzelców Konnych Wielkopolskich).

On 29 January 1919, the regiment once again changed its name to 1st Greater Poland Uhlan Regiment (Polish: 1 Pułk Ułanów Wielkopolskich). Two days later Col. Aleksander Pajewski became commander of the regiment.

In January 1920, after the unification of Greater Poland's army with the rest of the Polish Armed Forces, the unit was renamed to 15th Uhlans Regiment (Polish: 15 Pułk Ułanów). In July 1920, the reserve squadron of the 15th Reg. detached the 1st Sqn. of the newly created 115 Greater Poland Uhlan Regiment (Polish: 115 Pułk Ułanów Wielkopolskich) and 215 Greater Poland Volunteer Cavalry Regiment (Polish: 215 Ochotniczy Pułk Jazdy Wielkopolskiej).

On 5 August 1920, on proposal of the President of Poznań, Jarogniew Drwęski, the regiment was renamed to 15th Poznań Uhlans Regiment (Polish: 15 Pułk Ułanów Poznańskich). On 22 October 1927, the Poznań City Council and the regiment's officers revealed a monument of the Poznań Uhlans on Ludgarda Str. in Poznań. The statue, made by Mieczysław Lubelski and Adam Ballenstaed, shows an Uhlan as Saint George attacking a dragon with his lance.

During the September Campaign, the regiment was part of the Greater Poland Cavalry Brigade (Polish: Wielkopolska Brygada Kawalerii) in the frames of the Poznań Army (Polish: Armia "Poznań").

=== Western Polish Army ===
In 1942, the Regiment was recreated in the Anders Army as Battalion "S" (Polish: Batalion "S").

The battalion, along with other units of the Anders Army, left the Soviet Union and went to Iran, Iraq and later to the Middle East, where on 8 October 1942 it was transformed into an armoured reconnaissance unit named 15th Armoured Cavalry Regiment (Polish: 15 Pułk Kawalerii Pancernej). On 1 December 1943, the unit was named 15th Poznań Uhlans Regiment.

Later, as part of the II Corps (Poland), the regiment took part in the Italian Campaign (World War II). At the end of December 1944, the regiment was moved to the south of Italy for rest. Their unit was split into the 15th Reg. and the 25th Greater Poland Uhlan Regiment (Polish: 25 Pułk Ułanów Wielkopolskich). The new 15th Reg. was transformed into an armoured unit and subordinated to the 14th Greater Poland Armoured Brig.. During this time, reinforcements for the regiment were trained in Egypt. After the end of the war, the regiment was moved to United Kingdom. After demobilization in 1947, remains of the regiment in July 1947 formed Basie Unit 340 of the Polish Resettlement Corps at Slinfold Camp. The unit was dissolved in 1948.

=== Modern regiment ===
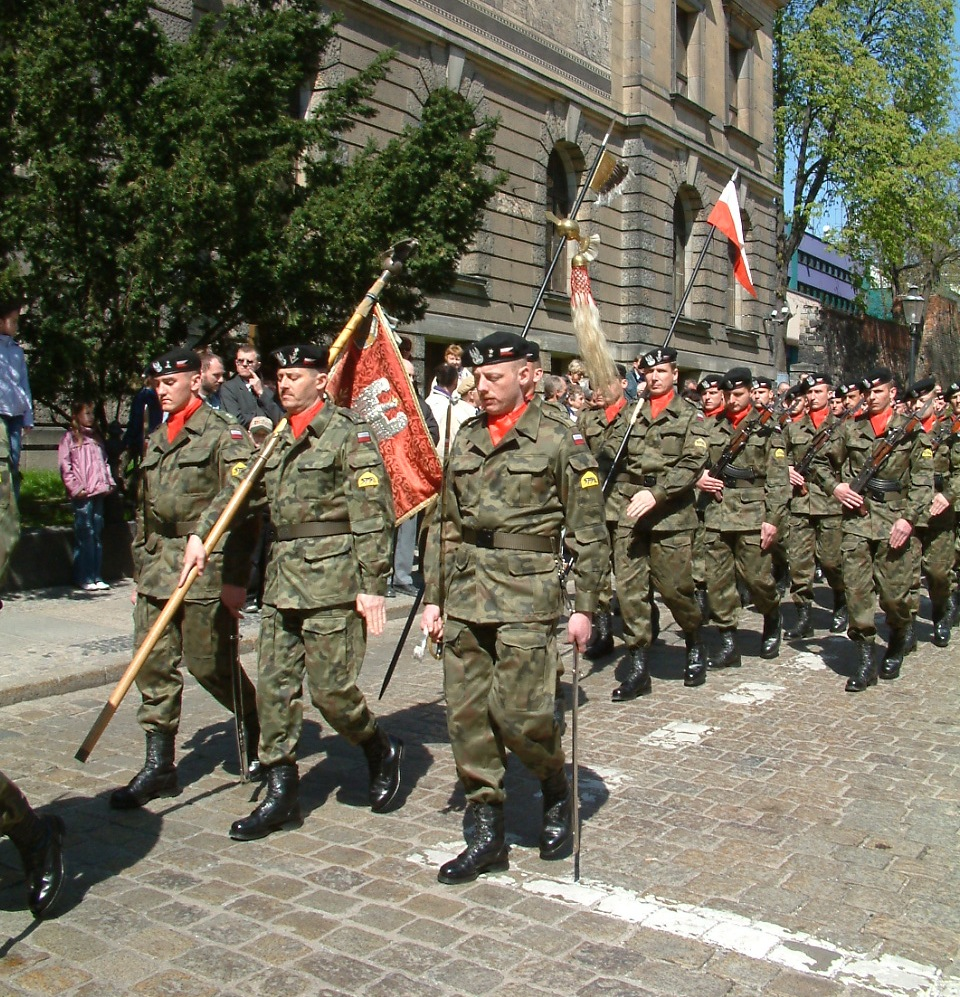
Soldiers of 1st Tank Btn. of 15th Greater Poland Armoured Brig., continuators of combat traditions of 15th Reg. with Colours of 15th Regiment

In 1996, due to efforts of the Society of Former Soldiers and Friends of 15th Poznań Uhlans Regiment (est. in 1991 in Poznań) and the Wheel of Poznań Uhlans of LtGen. Władysław Anders (est. in 1946 in Italy, later in London), a newly created armoured cavalry brigade in Wędrzyn was named 15th Greater Poland Armoured Cavalry Brigade (Polish: 15 Wielkopolska Brygada Kawalerii Pancernej), and its 1st Tank Battalion received the pennant colours of 15th Poznań Uhlans Reg. After the dissolution of 15th Brigade, the traditions of the 15th Reg. were passed on to the armoured battalion (since 2007, a mechanized infantry battalion) of 17th Greater Poland Mechanized Brigade (Polish: 17 Wielkopolska Brygada Zmechanizowana) named 15th Poznań Uhlans Battalion (Polish: 15 batalion Ułanów Poznańskich).

Pre-war uniforms of the 15th Regiment are used by the reenactment group Volunteer Representative Uhlans Unit of City of Poznań (Polish: Ochotniczy Reprezentacyjny Oddział Ułanów Miasta Poznania).

During the interbellum the regiment was dislocated to Poznań. The regiment anniversary was held on 23 April, as commemoration of Virtuti Militari decoration in 1921.

== Operational history ==
=== Greater Poland Uprising 1918-1919 ===
During the night between 5 and 6 January 1919, a squadron of Mounted Rifleman under command of 2nd Lt. Kazimierz Ciążyński took part in the Battle of Ławica Airfield. At the night between 9 and 10 January 1919, the Squadron was moved to Gniezno, and on 11 January took part in fights near Szubin. In later days the whole regiment was used as mobile reserve on different parts of Polish-German front line.

=== Polish–Soviet War ===
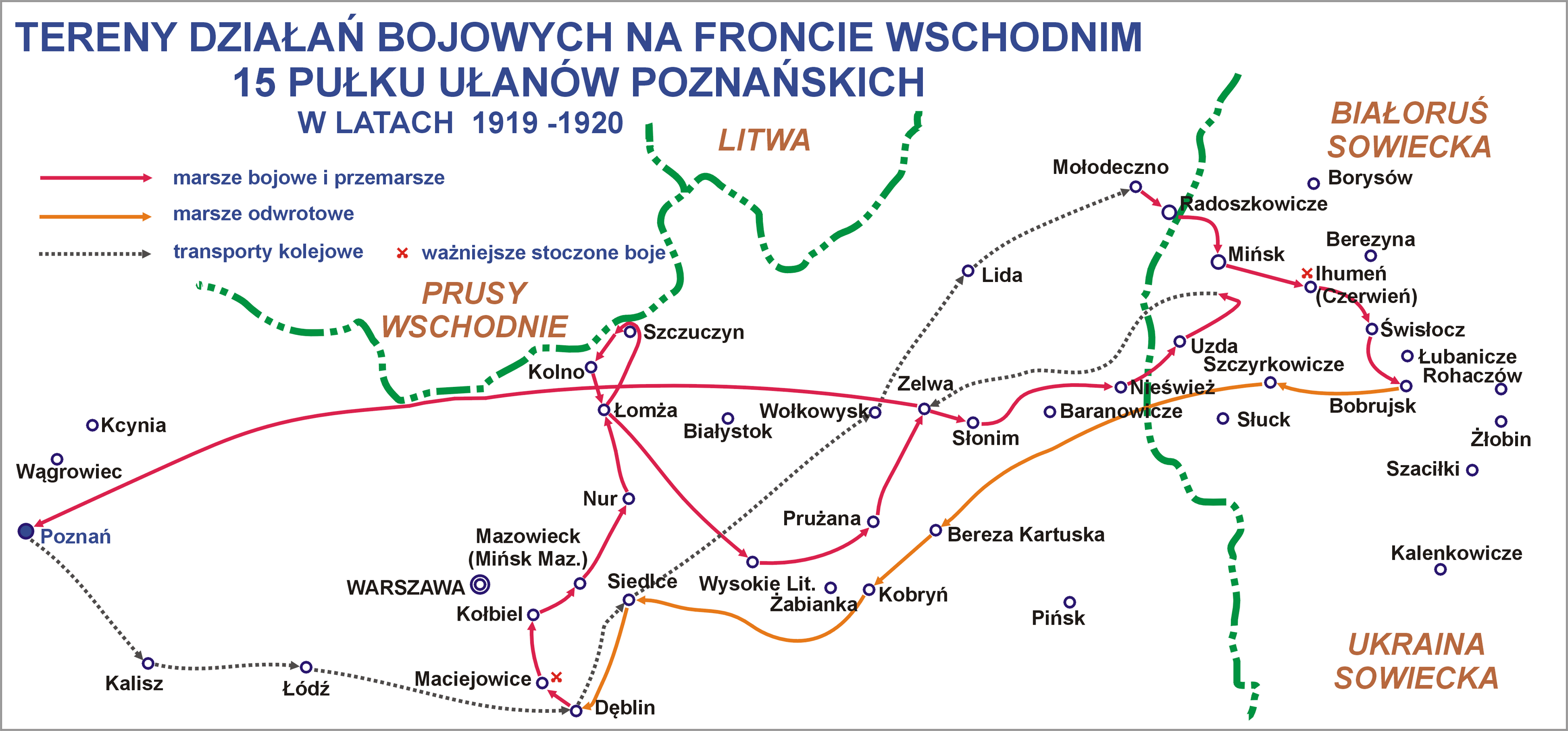
Area of combat actions of regiment 1919-1920

On 1 August 1919, the regiment moved to the front line as a part of 14th Greater Poland Infantry Division (Polish: 14 Wielkopolska Dywizja Piechoty). The regiment campaigned through Maladzyechna, Małe Gajany, Minsk, Ihumen, Bochuczewicze and Babruysk, which was captured on 28 August. Babruysk became the base of the regiment during the fights in the Berezina River valley and in Polesia until May 1920. In this period, Soviet soldiers nicknamed the regiment rogate, czerwone czorty (English: horned, red devils), due to the red colour on their rogatywkas. In May 1920 the regiment took part in stopping the offensive of the Soviet 16th Army, taking many soldiers from the Soviet cavalry brigade as prisoners. In June 1920, due to next Soviet offensive, the regiment was forced to retreat. During fights near Ivachnoviche, on 29 July the regiment's CO, LtCol. Władysław Anders, was wounded. As a part of the Polish counteroffensive the regiment broke through the Soviet lines on 16 August, near Maciejowice. Later the regiment took part in the Battle of the Niemen River. In the second half of September 1920 cavalryman took part in fights near Mezhiritch, Zelva and Snovy. The last city captured by the regiment was Minsk, from where the unit was withdrawn after the ceasefire. On 16 January 1921, the regiment returned to Poznań under the command of Władysław Anders. For their valor during the war, all regiments of the 14th Division received Virtuti Militari. The colours of the unit were decorated by Marsh. Józef Piłsudski on 22 April 1921.

=== September Campaign ===
On 1 September 1939 the regiment, as a part of the Greater Poland Cavalry Brigade, was near Zaniemyśl. After the outbreak of the war, the Regiment moved to Uniejów and Bzura River. Between 9 and 18 September 1939 the regiment, located on the eastern flank of the "Poznań" Army, took part in heavy fighting near Brochów and Walewice as a part of the Battle of Bzura. On 12 September in Ziewanice, the CO of regiment, LtCol. Tadeusz Mikke, was killed in action. After the battle of Bzura, the regiment formed the rear guard during the retreat of the "Poznań" Army and remains of the "Pomorze" through Puszcza Kampinoska to Warsaw. The regiment arrived in the Polish capital on 20 September. The regiment subsequently took part in the defence. The unit was disbanded on the day of the city's capitulation on 28 September.

=== Polish Armed Forces in the West ===
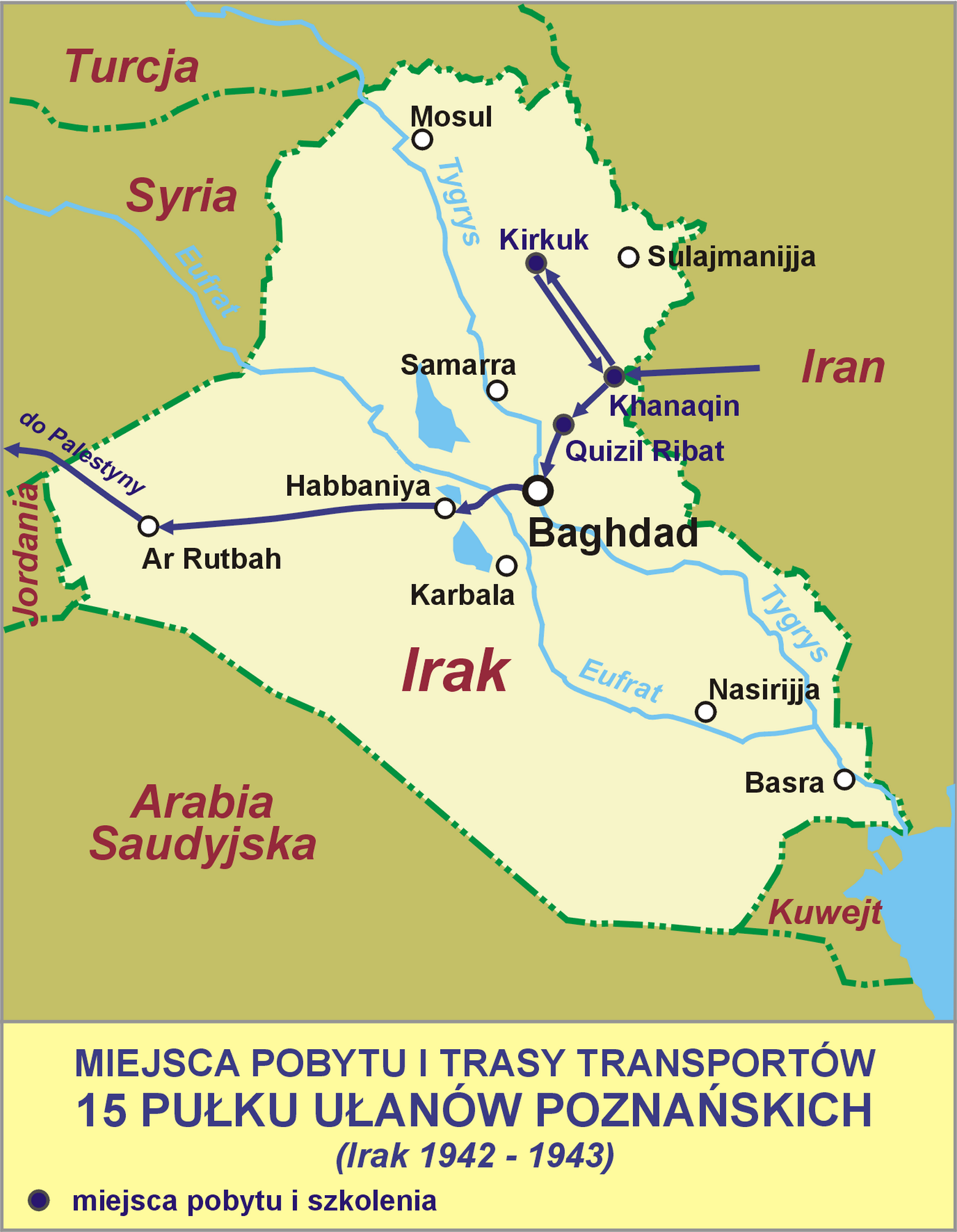
Route of 15th Reg. in Iraq 1942-1943

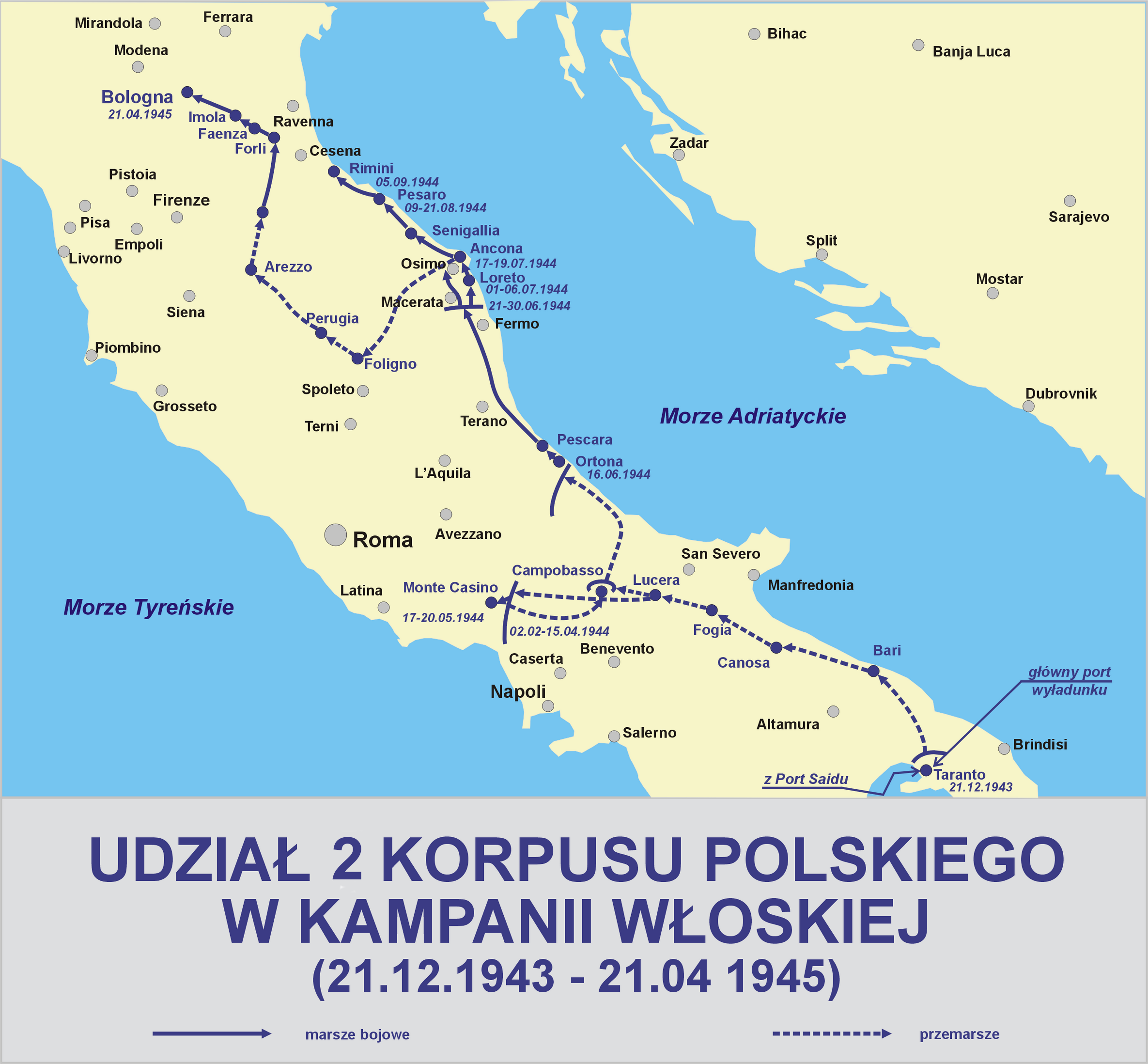
Route of Polish II Corps in the Italian Campaign

On 17 April 1942, Battalion "S" was formed in Yangiyo'l near Tashkent under command of Cpt. Zbigniew Kiedacz. On 8 October 1942, in Iraq, the unit was transformed into the 15 Regiment of Armoured Cavalry, reconnaissance unit of the 5th Kresowa Infantry Division. At the end of 1942, the regiment was renamed to 15th Poznań Uhlans Regiment. In next months, the unit was trained in Iraq, Palestine, Liban and Egypt. During February and March 1944, the regiment was moved to Italy. Uhlans took part in fighting on 6 April 1944 near Capracotta, and during the following days reached Genoa. Between 3 and 29 May 1944, the regiment took part in the Battle of Monte Cassino fighting on Castellone hill, and later broke through Hitler Line capturing Pizzo Corno and Monte Cairo. On 20 July, the unit ended its fights in the battle of Ancona. In October 1944, the regiment was fighting in the Emilian Apennines as a part of the breaking through the Gothic Line. On 23 October, the commanding officer of regiment, Col. Zbigniew Kiedacz, was killed in action. The regiment received the award Virtuti Militari for a second time for the Italian Campaign. In the winter 1944 and 1945, the 25th Greater Poland Uhlan Regiment (Polish: 25 Pułk Ułanów Wielkopolskich) was detached from the regiment. In January 1945, the 15th Reg. was moved to Egypt, where the unit, after receiving new tanks, was subordinated to the 14th Greater Polish Armoured Brig. (Polish: 14 Wielkopolska Brygada Pancerna). In October 1945, the brigade was moved to Giulianova in Italy and in June 1946 to Browning Camp near Horsham near London. In 1947, the regiment was disbanded.

== Commanders ==
- 2nd Lt. Kazimierz Ciążyński (30 December 1918 to 14 January 1919)
- 2nd Lt. Józef Lossow (14 to 29 January 1919)
- LtCol. Aleksander Pajewski (31 January 1919 to 23 April 1919)
- LtCol. Władysław Anders (23 April 1919 to end of September 1921)
- Col. Gwido Poten (September 1921 to 5 June 1924)
- Col. Stanisław Grzmot-Skotnicki (5 June 1924 to 11 August 1927)
- Col. Rudolf Dreszer (15 August 1927 - October 1931)
- vacant
- LtCol. Konrad Zembrzuski (30 March 1932 - 3 June 1938)
- LtCol. Tadeusz Mikke (3 June 1938 - 12 September 1939, KIA)
- Maj. Kazimierz Chłapowski (12 September 1939 - 28 September 1939)
- LtCol. Zbigniew Kiedacz (9 April 1942 to 23 October 1944, KIA)
- vacant
- LtCol. Adam Bieliński (4 November 1944 till disbanding in 1947)

== Other notable uhlans ==
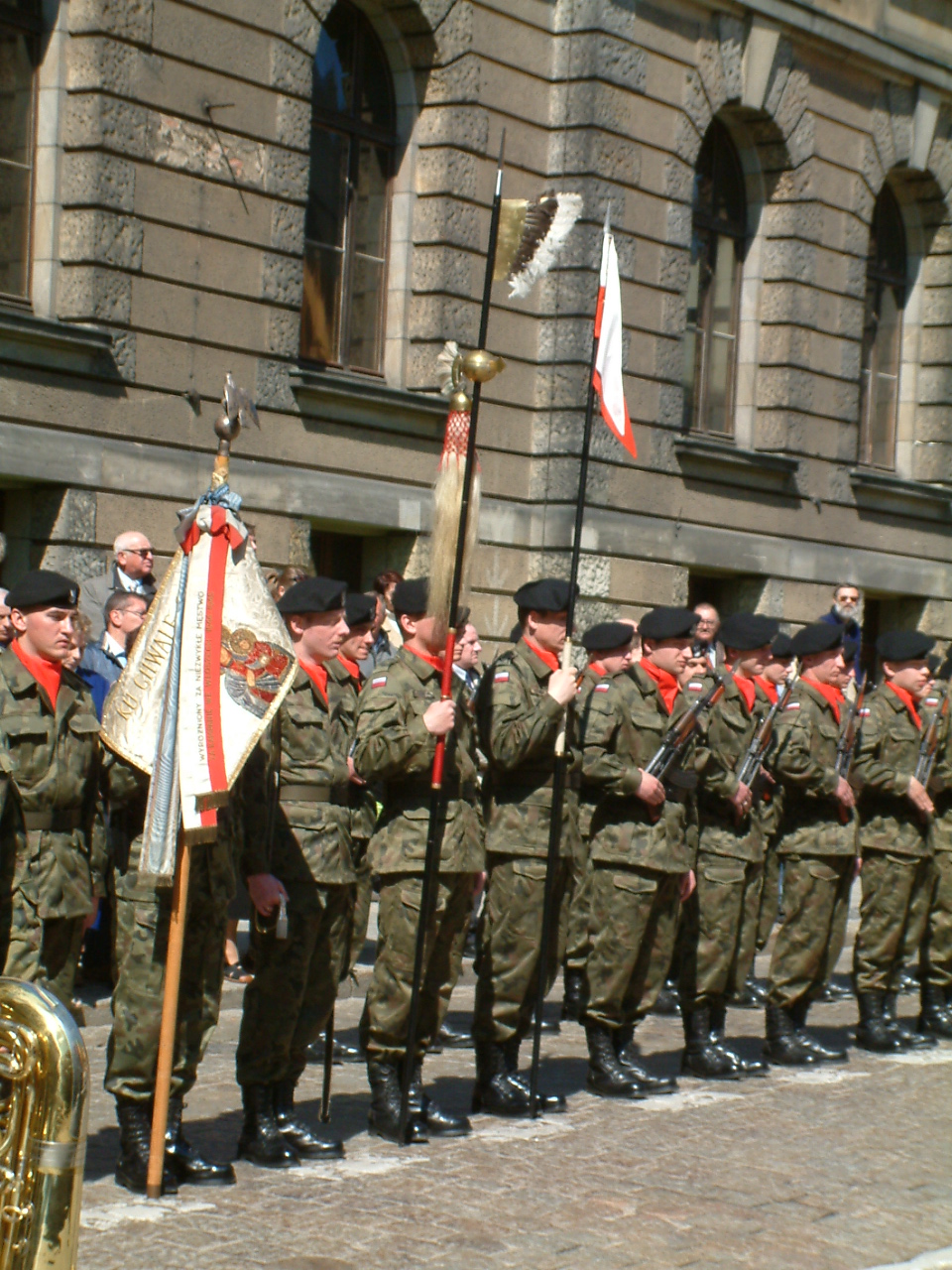
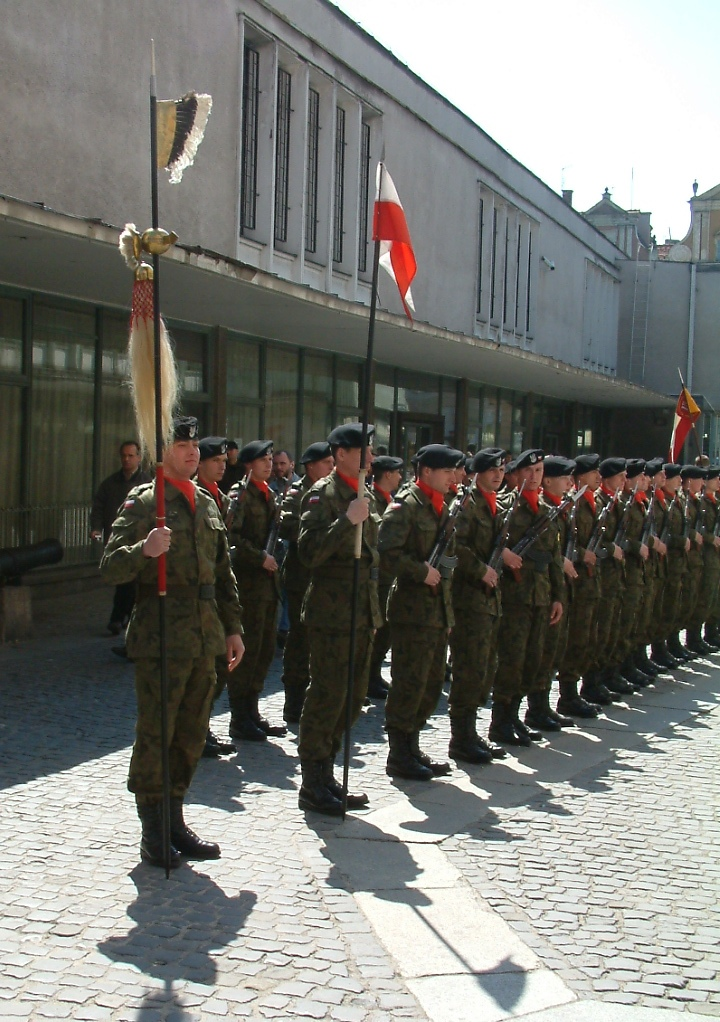
The modern day soldiers of 1st Tank Btn.
of the 15th Greater Poland Armoured Brig.
with Colours, bunchuk and pennant of 15th Reg.
- Lt. Witold Dzierżykraj-Morawski (1895–1944)
- Lt. Antoni Dunin (1907–1939), recipient of Virtuti Militari

== Bibliography ==
Notes

References

- Abraham Roman, Wspomnienia wojenne znad Warty i Bzury, Warszawa 1990, Wydawnictwo Ministerstwa Obrony Narodowej ISBN 83-11-07712-6
- "Księga jazdy polskiej": pod protektoratem marsz. Edwarda Śmigłego–Rydza. Warszawa 1936. Reprint: Wydawnictwo Bellona Warszawa 1993
- Czarnecki Jan Janusz "Zarys Historji Wojennej 15-go Pułku Ułanów Poznańskich, Wojskowe Biuro Historyczne, Warszawa 1929
- Grota, Zdzislawa; Polaka, Boguslawa, eds. (1982). 15 Pulk Ulanow Poznanskich w Obronie Ojczyzny 1919–1945 (trans: 15th regiment of Ulanow from Poznan, in defense of the fatherland, 1919–1945). Poznan.
