= Krośniewice =

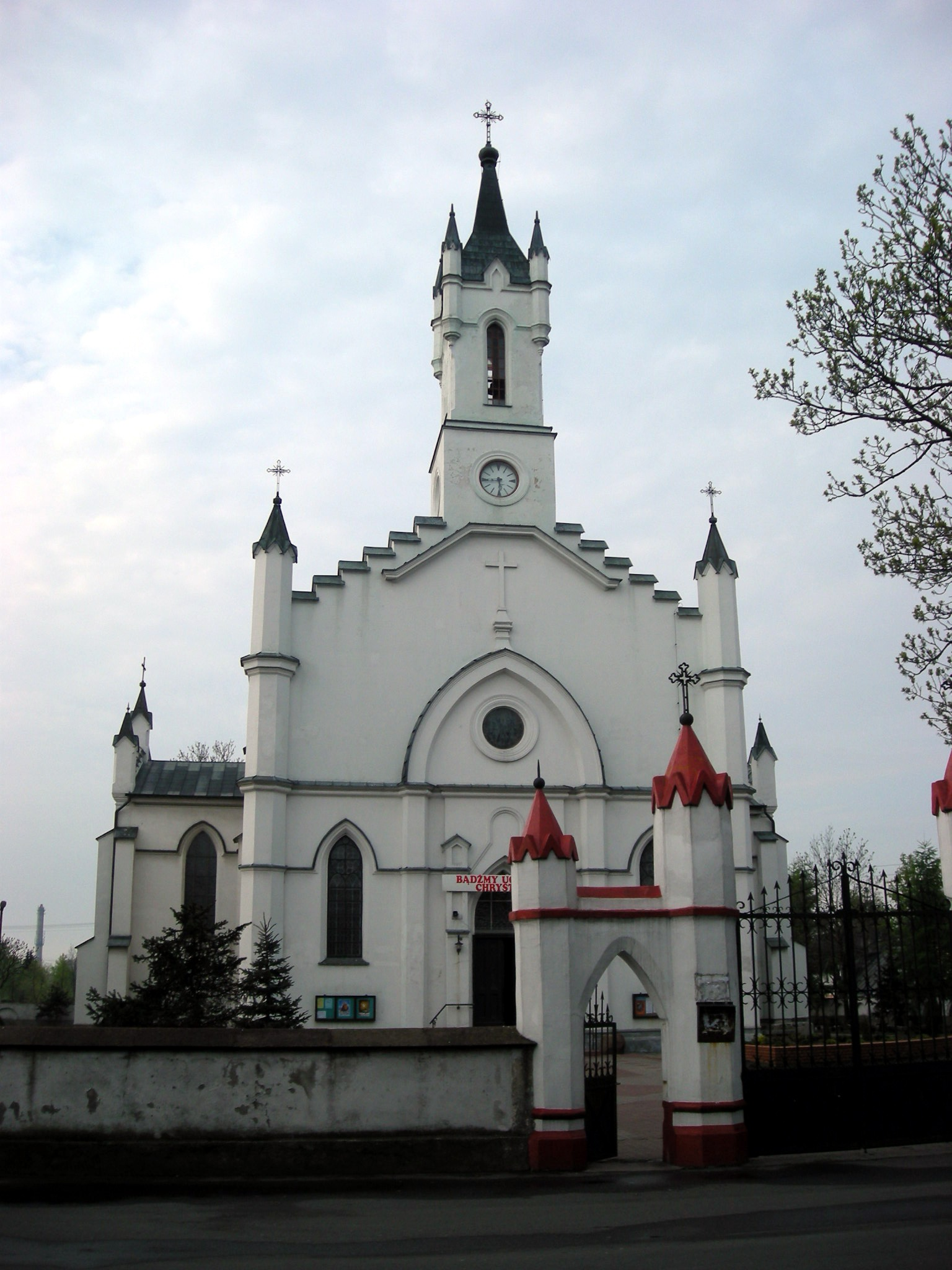
- Church of the Assumption of the Virgin Mary

- Coat of arms
- Interactive map of Krośniewice
- Location within Poland
- Coordinates: 52°15′13″N 19°10′12″E
- Country: Poland
- Voivodeship: Łódź
- County: Kutno
- Gmina: Krośniewice
- First mentioned: 14th century
- Town rights: 1442 or earlier

Government
  - Mayor: Katarzyna Erdman

Area
  - Total: 2.96 km^{2} (1.14 sq mi)

Population (31 December 2020)
  - Total: 4,258 ▼
  - Density: 1,440/km^{2} (3,730/sq mi)
- Time zone: UTC+1 (CET)
  - Summer (DST): UTC+2 (CEST)
- Postal code: 99-340
- Vehicle registration: EKU
- Website: krosniewice.pl

Krośniewice [krɔɕɲɛˈvʲit͡sɛ] is a town in Kutno County, Łódź Voivodeship, Poland, with 4,258 inhabitants (2020).

== Transport ==
The European routes E30 and E75 used to intersect in the town until a bypass was built around the town in 2010. The main railway between Warsaw and Poznań passes through Krośniewice. It also serves as an important depot of a narrow gauge railway line operating in the area.

== History ==
The town was first mentioned in historical documents from 1387 or 1388, and was apparently owned by a particular knight at the time, from the clan Awdaniec (or Abdank). The town's Coat of Arms is derived from the heraldry of that clan. It was granted town rights in 1442 or earlier. It was a private town of Polish nobility, administratively located in the Łęczyca County in the Łęczyca Voivodeship in the Greater Poland Province of the Kingdom of Poland. In the Second Partition of Poland, in 1793, it was annexed by Prussia. In 1807 it was regained by Poles and included in the short-lived Duchy of Warsaw, and after its dissolution, in 1815, it became part of Congress Poland in the Russian Partition of Poland. Many inhabitants took part in the Polish January Uprising of 1863–1864. As punishment for the uprising, the tsarist administration deprived Krośniewice of its town rights, however, the settlement still developed. In 1918 Poland regained independence and the settlement was reintegrated with Poland. Town rights were restored in 1926. The town had 3,500 residents in 1926.

During the German invasion of Poland, which started World War II, Krośniewice was occupied by the German Army on 16 September 1939, and then the SS-Totenkopf-Standarte Brandenburg entered the town to commit various atrocities against the Polish population. In 1940, the Germans expelled 888 Poles from the town, and further expulsions were carried out in 1941–1943. Homes of the expelled Poles were handed over to German colonists in accordance with the Lebensraum policy. The Poles were either deported to the General Government (German-occupied central Poland) or to forced labour in Germany, or sent as slave labour to new German colonists in the area. Like many cities and towns in German-occupied Poland, it was the site of a German-run ghetto, where the Jewish population of the town was confined before being sent to the death camps. German occupation ended in 1945.

== Culture ==
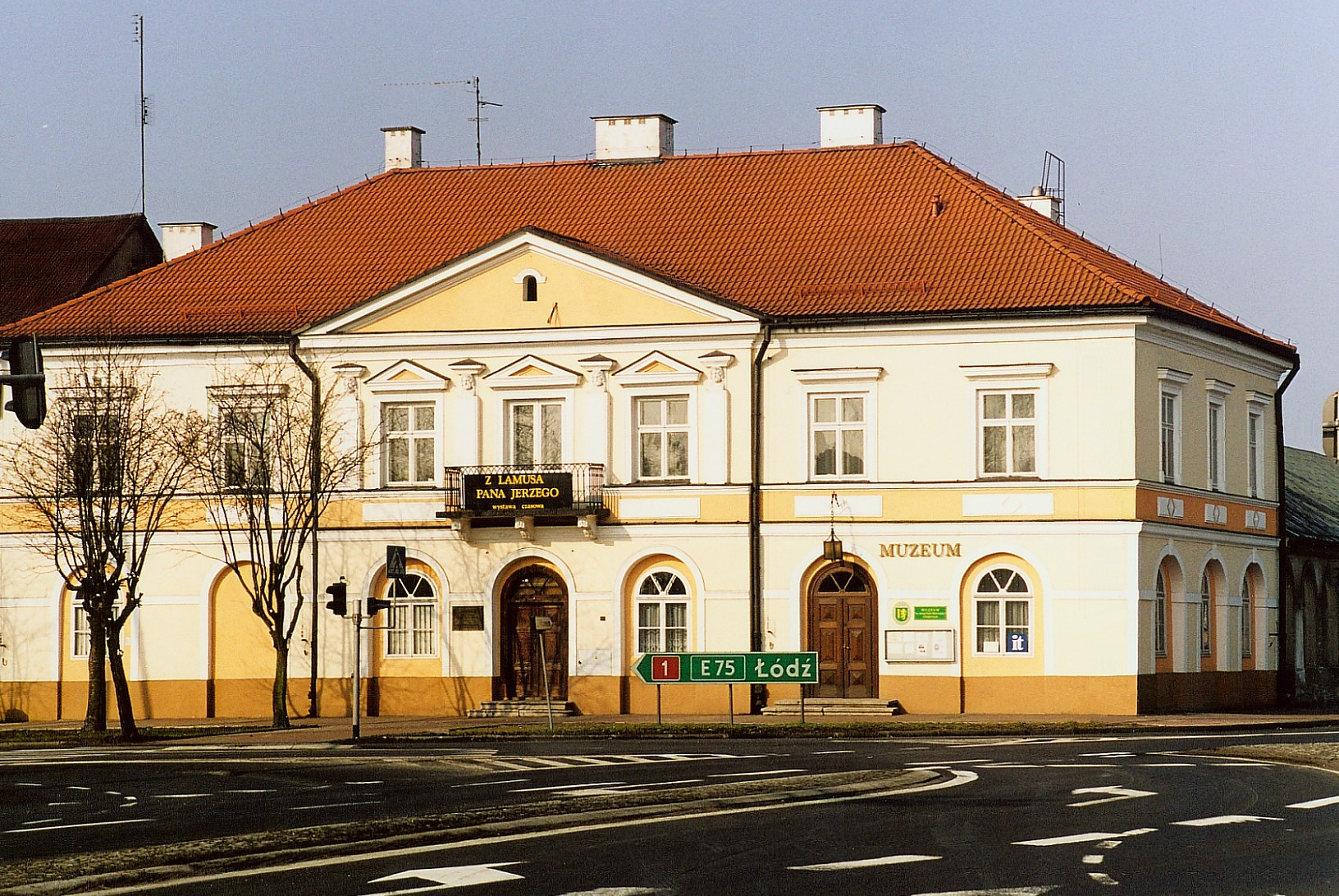
Jerzy Dunin Borkowski Museum

There is a museum in central Krośniewice, called the Jerzy Dunin Borkowski Museum, which was named after the "Hetman of the Polish Collectors", Jerzy Dunin-Borkowski. This museum contains various important historical artifacts connected to such historical figures as Napoleon and Ignacy Jan Paderewski.
