= Research Laboratory of Electronics =

Research center at the Massachusetts Institute of Technology

Coordinates: 42.3614°N 71.0916°W

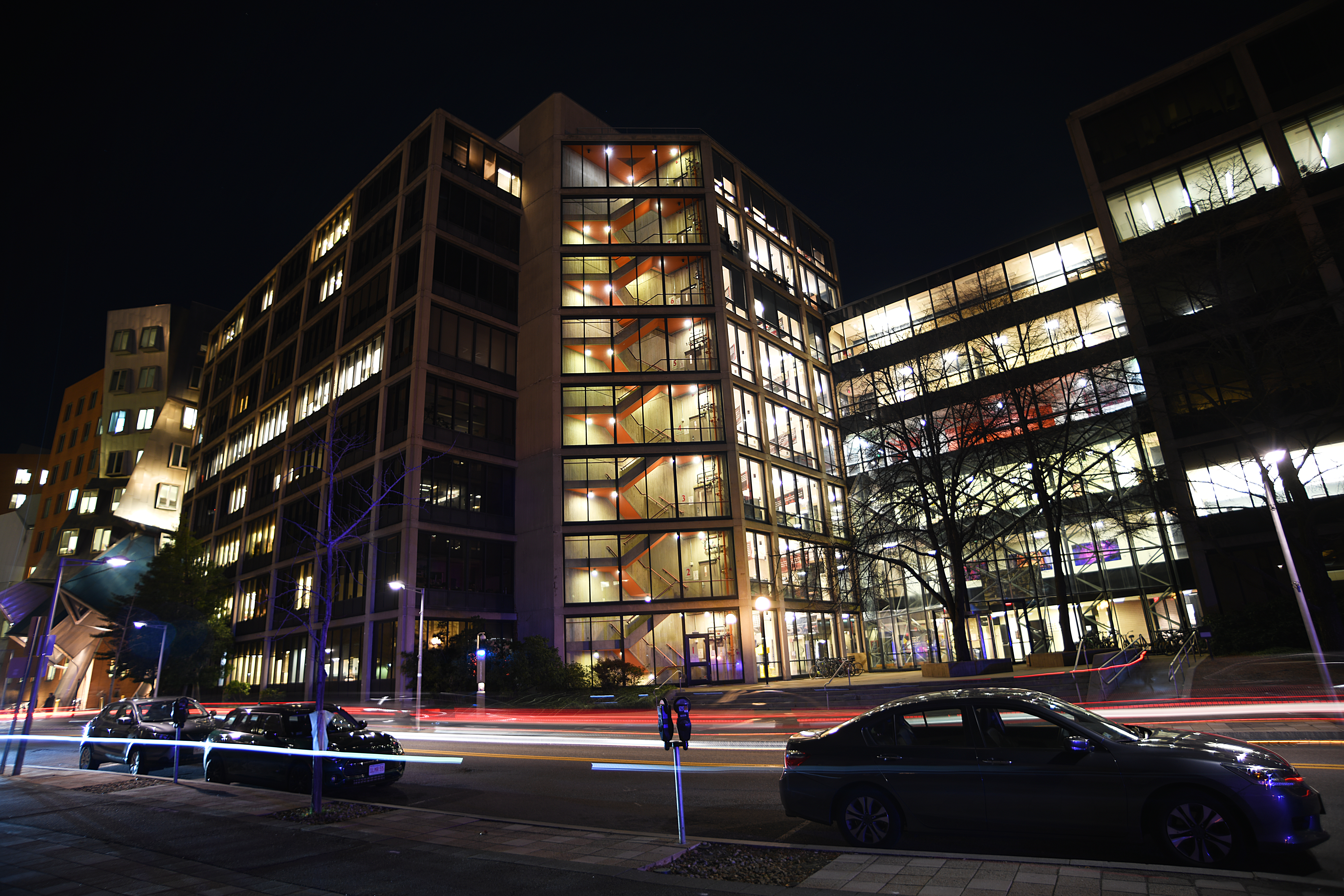
- Established: July 1, 1946
- Director: Marc A. Baldo
- Location: Building 36, Massachusetts Institute of Technology, Cambridge, Massachusetts, United States
- Affiliations: Massachusetts Institute of Technology
- Nobel laureates: Wolfgang Ketterle; Rainer Weiss
- Website: Research Laboratory of Electronics

The Research Laboratory of Electronics (RLE) is a physics and electrical engineering research center at the Massachusetts Institute of Technology. Established on July 1, 1946, as MIT's first interdepartmental laboratory, it became a model for postwar academic science, combining basic research with military funding and cross-disciplinary collaboration.

Emerging from the wartime Radiation Laboratory and supported primarily by the military's Joint Services Electronics Program, RLE has trained thousands of doctoral students in fields ranging from microwave electronics to communications theory.

== History ==
=== Planning and establishment ===
Planning for RLE began in August 1944, as Allied forces advanced in Europe. On August 28, MIT president Karl Compton, Dean of Science George Harrison, and professors John Slater, Harold Hazen, and Julius Stratton met to develop plans for a postwar electronics laboratory. Slater, head of MIT's Physics Department, envisioned an interdisciplinary laboratory jointly operated by the physics and electrical engineering departments, estimating it would involve 60 to 75 personnel including faculty, staff, and graduate students. The proposed laboratory would supplement rather than replace traditional departmental structures, providing a venue for research that crossed conventional disciplinary boundaries.

Julius Stratton, who had worked at the Radiation Laboratory on LORAN and served in the office of the Secretary of War under Edward Bowles during World War II, became RLE's founding director after declining a management position at Bell Laboratories. Following the Radiation Laboratory's closure in late 1945, the armed services agreed to continue funding its Basic Research Division for six months and transferred approximately one million dollars worth of surplus equipment. In March 1946, the military established the Joint Services Electronics Program (JSEP) to provide ongoing financial support for electronics laboratories at MIT, Harvard, and Columbia, with equal participation from the Navy Office of Research and Inventions, Army Air Force, and Signal Corps.

RLE formally opened on July 1, 1946, with seventeen faculty members from MIT's physics and electrical engineering departments, twenty-seven staff members, and graduate students formerly employed by the Radiation Laboratory. The laboratory received a $600,000 annual budget from JSEP and $50,000 from MIT. Among the twenty-six former Radiation Laboratory staff who joined were Jerrold Zacharias, Ivan Getting, and Albert G. Hill. Many benefited from a special provision allowing people with wartime experience to serve simultaneously as research associates and graduate students. The laboratory was housed in Building 20, the temporary plywood structure that had served the Radiation Laboratory.

=== Early research program ===
RLE's initial research program, announced in September 1945, was organized under five headings: Microwave Electronics, Microwave Physics, Modern Electronic Techniques Applied to Problems of Physics and Engineering, Microwave Communications, and Electronic Aids to Computation. By March 1946, the laboratory's first quarterly progress report listed 22 MIT faculty and instructors, 16 RLE staff members, and 30 research associates and graduate students as personnel. Research spanned microwave spectroscopy, secure communications, electronic computation, and atomic clocks.

One of RLE's first major responsibilities was participation in Project Meteor, a classified U.S. Navy Bureau of Ordnance project involving missile guidance and telemetry. While the project was highly classified, many student theses addressed general problems that could be conducted without security restrictions. This pattern—classified military projects generating unclassified fundamental research and student training—characterized much of RLE's early work.

The laboratory became a leading center for the development of statistical communication theory and information theory in the late 1940s. Norbert Wiener's wartime work on prediction and filtering, his daily presence at RLE, and his 1948 book Cybernetics provided crucial intellectual foundations. Professor Lee Yuk-wing, who had completed his doctoral work under Wiener in 1930, arrived from China in 1946 and played a key role in making Wiener's difficult ideas accessible to engineers. Researchers including William Tuller, Robert Fano, and visiting Bell Labs scientist Claude Shannon developed converging approaches to information theory, with Shannon's landmark 1948 paper acknowledging the parallel work at RLE. Shannon moved to MIT and RLE in 1956.

RLE researchers also made early contributions to spread-spectrum communications. During the summer 1950 Project Hartwell study on protecting overseas transportation, a team including Jerrold Zacharias and Jerome Wiesner developed techniques for secure radio communication using noise-modulated carriers. This work, initially classified, led to substantial research programs in the early 1950s and eventual practical systems.

RLE debuted an interdisciplinary organizational model designed to supplement rather than replace traditional academic departments. As Stratton later explained, the laboratory took account of newly emerging fields of science that cut across conventional disciplinary boundaries and provided common ground for pure and applied aspects of basic research. This structure, which MIT president James Killian in 1949 identified as essential for integrated approaches to fields such as electronics, became a template replicated at MIT and other universities.

Among the laboratory's achievements was the emergence of MIT's linguistics program. Research in the early 1950s focused on problems of speech analysis and machine translation closely related to engineering applications. After Noam Chomsky joined MIT and RLE in 1955, emphasis shifted to the study of syntax and elaboration of a new approach to linguistics. Recognition of the importance of this work was rapid, and in 1961 a graduate program in linguistics was launched.

An optical coherence tomography scan of a human retina

RLE student Ivan Sutherland developed Sketchpad as a thesis project, published in 1963. This was "the first interactive computer-graphics program" and was credited with inaugurating the study of computer graphics.

Also in 1963, Project MAC (the Project on Mathematics and Computation, later backronymed to Multiple Access Computer, Machine Aided Cognitions, or Man and Computer) was launched with a grant from DARPA to study time-sharing. Project MAC provided the basis for the development of computing networking. The project was later split off into the Artificial Intelligence Laboratory and the Laboratory of Computer Science, which eventually merged into the Computer Science and Artificial Intelligence Laboratory.

In 1967, an RLE team developed the "Reading Machine", an optical character recognition device that could convert text into computer-generated speech. It was initially intended to support reading printed text for those with vision loss.

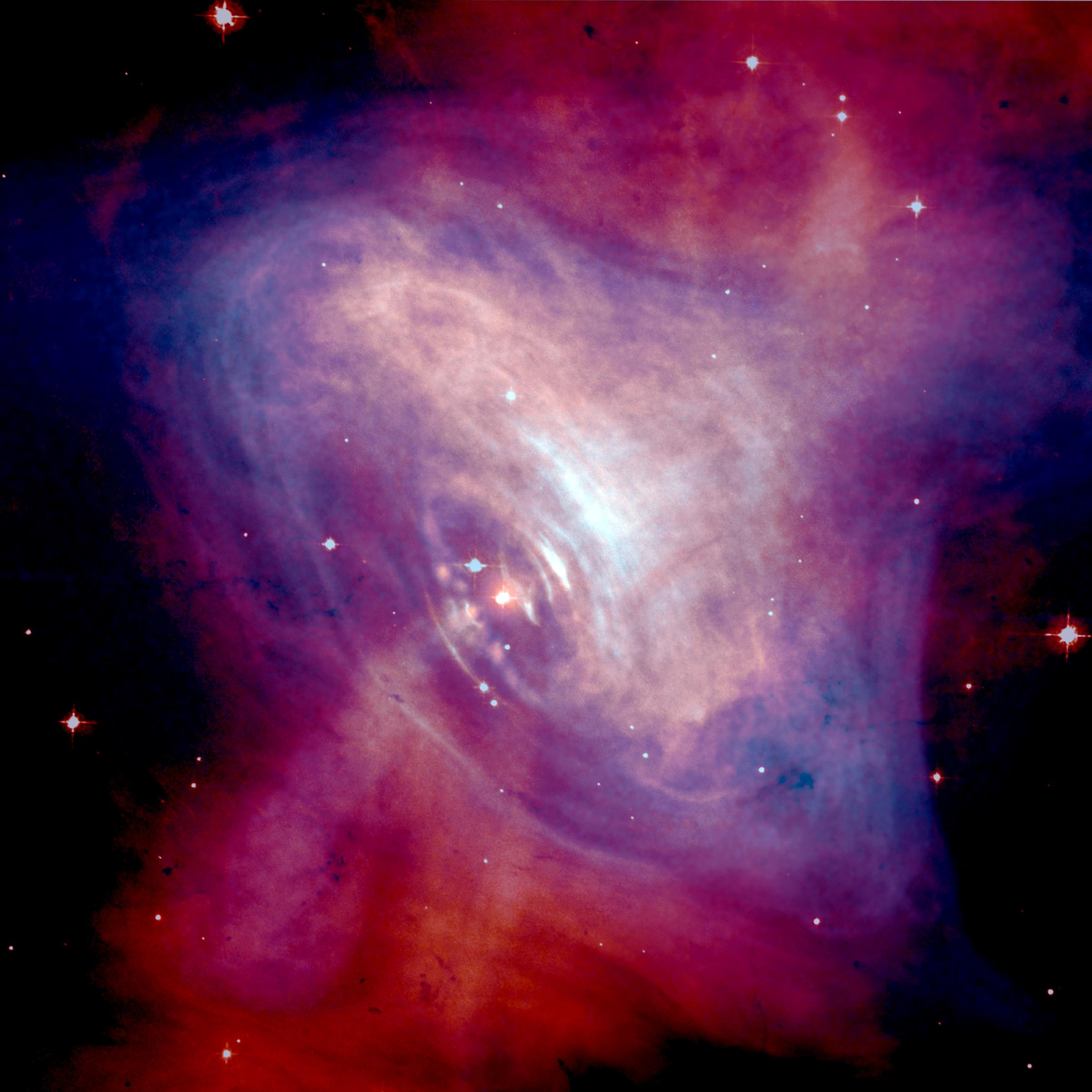
Composite image of the Crab Nebula

Professor David H. Staelin co-discovered the Crab Pulsar, the central star of the Crab Nebula, in 1968. He also in 1975 led a team that developed the first microwave-imaging spectrometers to be launched into Earth's orbit, used for climate monitoring.

=== Evolution of military relationship ===
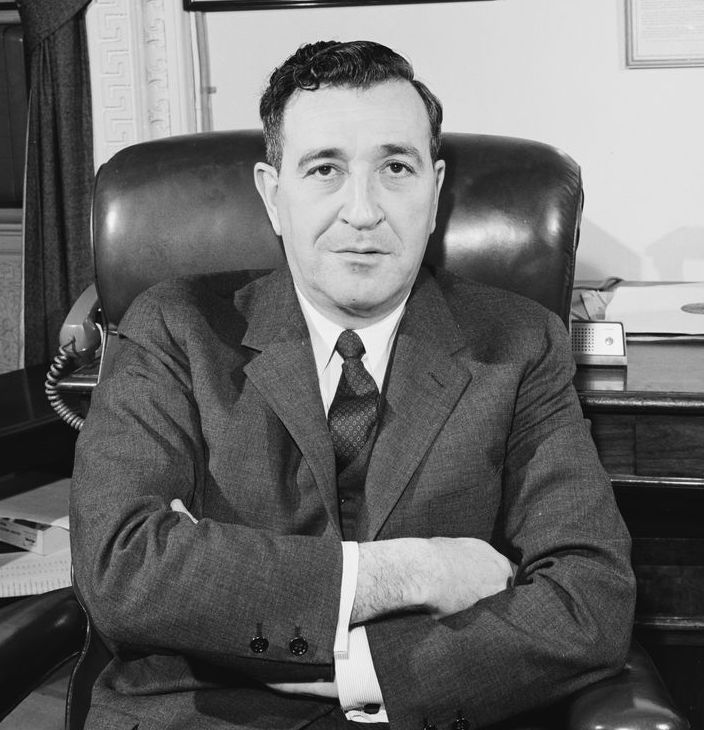
Jerome Wiesner

The laboratory's relationship with military funders embodied tensions of postwar academic science. RLE administrators emphasized that the JSEP contract supported basic, unclassified research with no restrictions on publication and prioritized graduate education. However, much of the work addressed military interests in microwave tubes, waveguides, missile telemetry, and secure communications, overseen by a technical advisory committee of military scientists. The joint services wished to maintain close liaison between the military and the frontiers of electronic science and engineering and to have a laboratory from which the military services could draw competent technical help at critical times. Director Jerome Wiesner, who later called RLE "an almost ideal research environment," characterized it as a unique and wonderful experience. Although a later generation would consider this arrangement a Faustian bargain, it was not so regarded at the time.

The Soviet atomic bomb explosion in 1949 and the Korean War's outbreak in June 1950 intensified military interest. In 1950, the Pentagon asked RLE to double its budget to accommodate applied military research projects. Part of this additional work connected with an Air Force effort to design and build an early-warning strategic radar system. An ad hoc group, Project Charles, was formed to consider the project's feasibility and MIT's role in undertaking it. The dimensions proved so massive that creation of a separate organization was recommended. Accordingly, in 1951 Lincoln Laboratory was established as a federal contract laboratory administered by MIT. Many of RLE's military research projects were then transferred to Lincoln Laboratory, and RLE director Albert G. Hill moved there as well. The two laboratories remained joined: graduate students pursued research at Lincoln while earning degrees at the institute, RLE and Lincoln together spawned some sixty electronics firms, and Lincoln became an ongoing sponsor of RLE research projects.

The segregation of applied military work allowed RLE to focus on basic research. The laboratory expanded dramatically, growing from five distinct research groups in 1946 to ten in 1951, twenty-two in 1956, and thirty in 1961. By 1961, eighteen of those groups belonged to a separate Division of Communication Sciences and Engineering that had evolved from one of the 1946 groups.

=== Recent history ===
In 1974, RLE researchers launched the Laserphoto system for the Associated Press. This system, which replaced Wirephoto, used lasers to transmit photos for use in member newspapers.

Researchers at RLE, the Lincoln Laboratory, Harvard Medical School, and Wellman Laboratories collaborated on the development of optical coherence tomography imaging in 1991. This scanning approach is particularly useful for producing high-resolution images of the structures of the eye.

In 1996, RLE researcher Jae Lim helped create the Grand Alliance consortium. The purpose of this group was to develop specifications for high-definition television in the US.

Researcher Wolfgang Ketterle created the first atom laser in 1997. Ketterle received a 2001 Nobel Prize in Physics for his co-discovery of Bose-Einstein condensates. In 2017, an RLE team led by Ketterle created a supersolid, "which combines the properties of solids with those of superfluids".

In 2000, Daniel Kleppner co-founded the Center for Ultracold Atoms, a collaboration between RLE and Harvard University. He also co-invented the hydrogen maser atomic clock, and conducted research on atomic interactions which enabled the development of magnetic resonance imaging and global positioning systems.

Rainer Weiss shared the 2017 Nobel Prize in Physics for his work on the Laser Interferometer Gravitational-Wave Observatory (LIGO).

The Laboratory for Electromagnetic and Electronic Systems was merged into RLE in 2009. In 2017, T. J. Rodgers funded an eponymous laboratory at RLE with a $5 million donation. In 2019 RLE launched the MIT Center for Quantum Engineering jointly with MIT Lincoln Lab.

== Operations ==
Julius Stratton served as RLE's founding director from 1946 until 1949, when he became MIT's first provost. (Note: Before Stratton, the second-highest officer of MIT was known as the Vice President.) The Laboratory for Nuclear Science and Engineering, directed by Jerrold Zacharias, was brought into Stratton's administrative domain shortly after RLE's founding. Albert G. Hill succeeded Stratton as director (1949–1952) before becoming director of Lincoln Laboratory.. These early leaders were followed by:

- Jerome Wiesner (1952–1961)
- Henry Zimmermann (1961–1976)
- Peter Wolff (1976–1981)
- Jonathan Allen (1981–2000)
- Jeffrey H. Shapiro (2001–2011)
- Yoel Fink (2011–2016)
- Marc Baldo (2017–)

RLE is divided into seven main research groups:

- Atomic Physics (Center for Ultracold Atoms)
- Information Science and Systems
- Biomedical Science and Engineering
- Energy, Power, and Electromagnetics
- Nanoscale Materials, Devices and Systems
- Photonic Materials, Devices and Systems
- Quantum Computation and Communication

As of 2025 RLE has 98 principal investigators, 513 graduate students, and 104 undergraduates. Much of the center's research is sponsored by the US federal government, with 33% of sponsored research funding coming from various agencies of the US Department of Defense, 20% from the National Institutes of Health, and 15% from the National Science Foundation; 10% of funding comes from industry collaborations and 20% from collaborations with other non-profit institutions (particularly hospitals).

=== Facilities ===
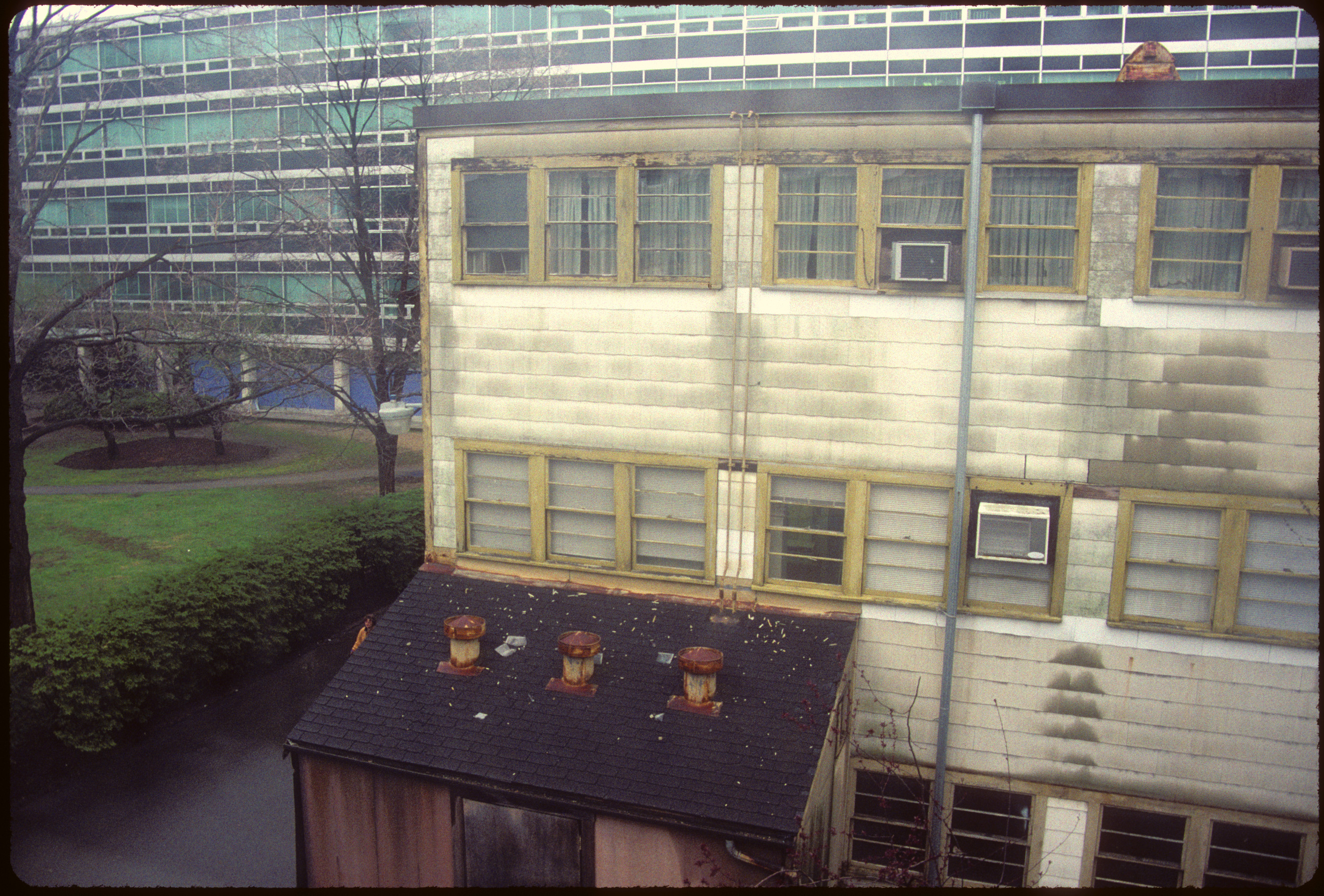
Exterior of Building 20, with Building 26 in background

RLE was initially housed in Building 20. According to Noam Chomsky, "It looked like it was going to fall apart. There were no amenities, the plumbing was visible, and the windows looked like they were going to fall out." The building was demolished and replaced by the Stata Center in 2004.

The majority of RLE was relocated to the Karl Taylor Compton Laboratories (Building 26) in 1957, expanding into the Sherman Fairchild Electrical Engineering and Electronics Complex (Building 36) in 1973. The Education Center (Building 34) was added in 1983.

== Impact ==
By the early 1960s, RLE had trained approximately three hundred doctoral students and six hundred recipients of master's degrees. The laboratory helped secure MIT's position as the nation's top nonindustrial defense contractor for decades. Its interdepartmental structure, combining physics and electrical engineering with eventual expansion into linguistics, communications biophysics, and computer science, demonstrated how traditional disciplinary boundaries could be productively crossed while maintaining departmental integrity. The laboratory spawned additional interdepartmental research centers at MIT, including laboratories focused on artificial intelligence, solid-state physics, and plasma physics. RLE research also gave rise to dozens of private companies.

== Notable alumni ==
Many future MIT leaders—including two Institute presidents (Stratton and Wiesner), three directors of Lincoln Laboratory, and numerous department chairs—received their training at RLE in its early years.

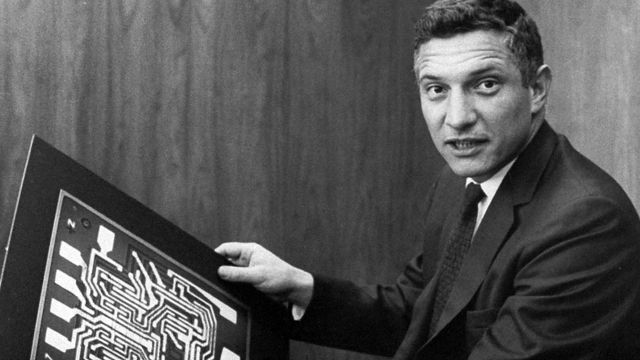
Robert Noyce

Notable alumni include:

- Julian J. Bussgang, creator of the Bussgang theorem of stochastic analysis
- Amar Bose, chairman of the Bose Corporation
- Larry Roberts, creator of ARPANET
- Thomas Kailath, entrepreneur and founder of the Information Systems Laboratory at Stanford University
- Robert Noyce, co-inventor of the integrated circuit
- Irwin M. Jacobs, cofounder and CEO of Qualcomm
- William Daniel Phillips, winner of the 1997 Nobel Prize in Physics
- Francis F. Lee, founder of American Data Sciences (later Lexicon
- Ivan Sutherland, early researcher in computer graphics

== Bibliography ==
- Buderi, Robert (1996). The Invention that Changed the World: How a Small Group of Radar Pioneers Won the Second World War and Launched a Technological Revolution. Simon & Schuster. ISBN 978-0684835297.
- Geiger, Roger L. (1993). Research and Relevant Knowledge : American Research Universities since World War II. New York; London: Oxford University Press.
- Leslie, Stuart W. (1993). The Cold War and American Science: The Military-Industrial-Academic Complex at MIT and Stanford. New York: Columbia University Press. ISBN 9780231079587.
- Wildes, Karl L.; Lindgren, Nilo A. (1985). A Century of Electrical Engineering and Computer Science at MIT, 1882-1982. Cambridge: MIT Press. doi:10.7551/mitpress/1772.003.0027 (inactive 3 April 2026).
