= Anders' Army =

Polish Allies-aligned army during WWII

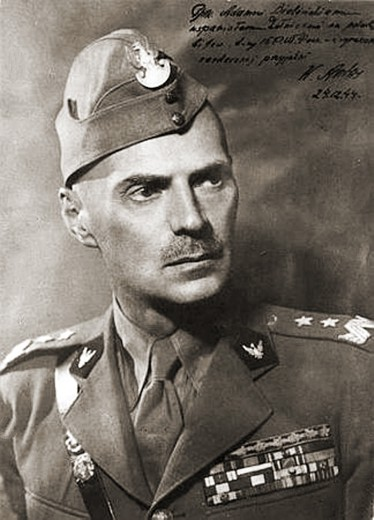
Władysław Anders, commander of the Polish Armed Forces in the East

Anders' Army (Polish: Armia Andersa) was the informal yet common name of the Polish Armed Forces in the East in the 1941–42 period, in recognition of its commander Władysław Anders. The army was created in the Soviet Union but, in March 1942, based on an understanding between the British, Polish, and Soviets, it was evacuated from the Soviet Union and made its way through Iran to Palestine. There it passed under British command and provided the bulk of the units and troops of the Polish II Corps (member of the Polish Armed Forces in the West), which fought in the Italian Campaign. Anders' Army is notable for having been primarily composed of liberated POWs and for Wojtek, a bear who had honorary membership.

== Establishment in the Soviet Union ==
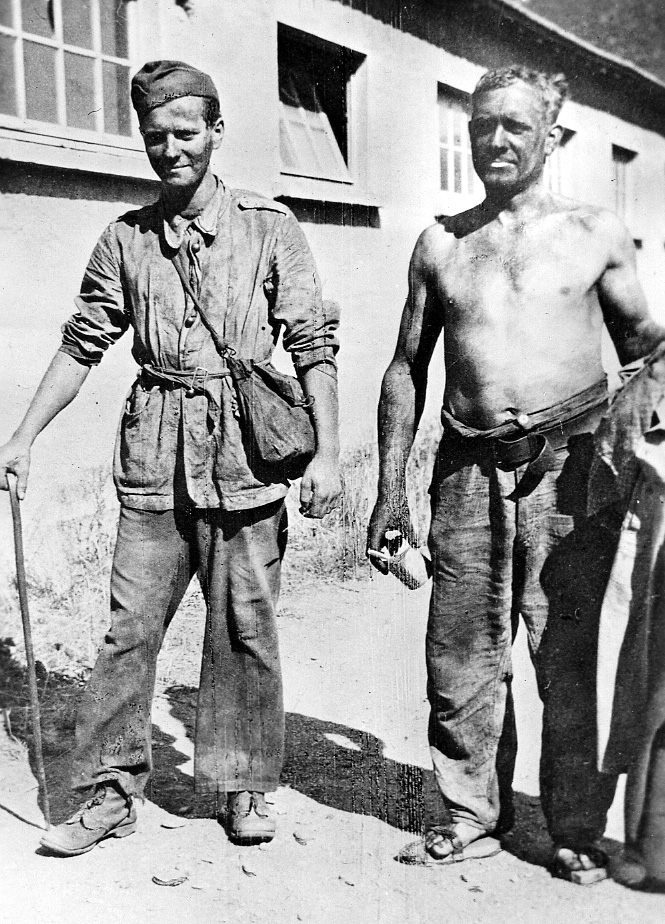
Polish volunteers to Anders' Army, released from a Soviet Gulag camp

At the start of the Soviet invasion of Poland (17 September 1939), the Soviets declared that the Polish state, previously invaded by Axis forces on 1 September 1939, no longer existed, effectively breaking off Polish–Soviet relations. Soviet authorities deported about 325,000 Polish citizens from Soviet-occupied Poland to the Soviet Union in 1940–41. Due to British mediation and pressure, the Soviet Union and the Polish government-in-exile (then based in London) re-established Polish–Soviet diplomatic relations in July 1941 after the German invasion of the Soviet Union started on 22 June 1941. The Sikorski–Mayski agreement of 30 July 1941 resulted in the Soviet Union agreeing to invalidate the territorial aspects of the pacts it had had with Nazi Germany and to release tens of thousands of Polish prisoners-of-war held in Soviet camps. Pursuant to the agreement between the Polish government-in-exile and the Soviet Union, the Soviets granted "amnesty" to many Polish citizens, from whom a military force was formed. A Polish–Soviet military agreement was signed on 14 August 1941; it attempted to specify the political and operational conditions for the functioning of the Polish army on Soviet soil. Stalin agreed that this force would be subordinate to the Polish government-in-exile, while operationally being a part of the Soviet-German Eastern Front.

On 4 August 1941 the Polish prime minister and commander-in-chief, General Władysław Sikorski, nominated General Władysław Anders, just released from the Lubyanka prison in Moscow, as commander of the army. General Michał Tokarzewski began the task of forming the army in the Soviet village of Totskoye in Orenburg Oblast on 17 August. Anders announced his appointment and issued his first orders on 22 August.

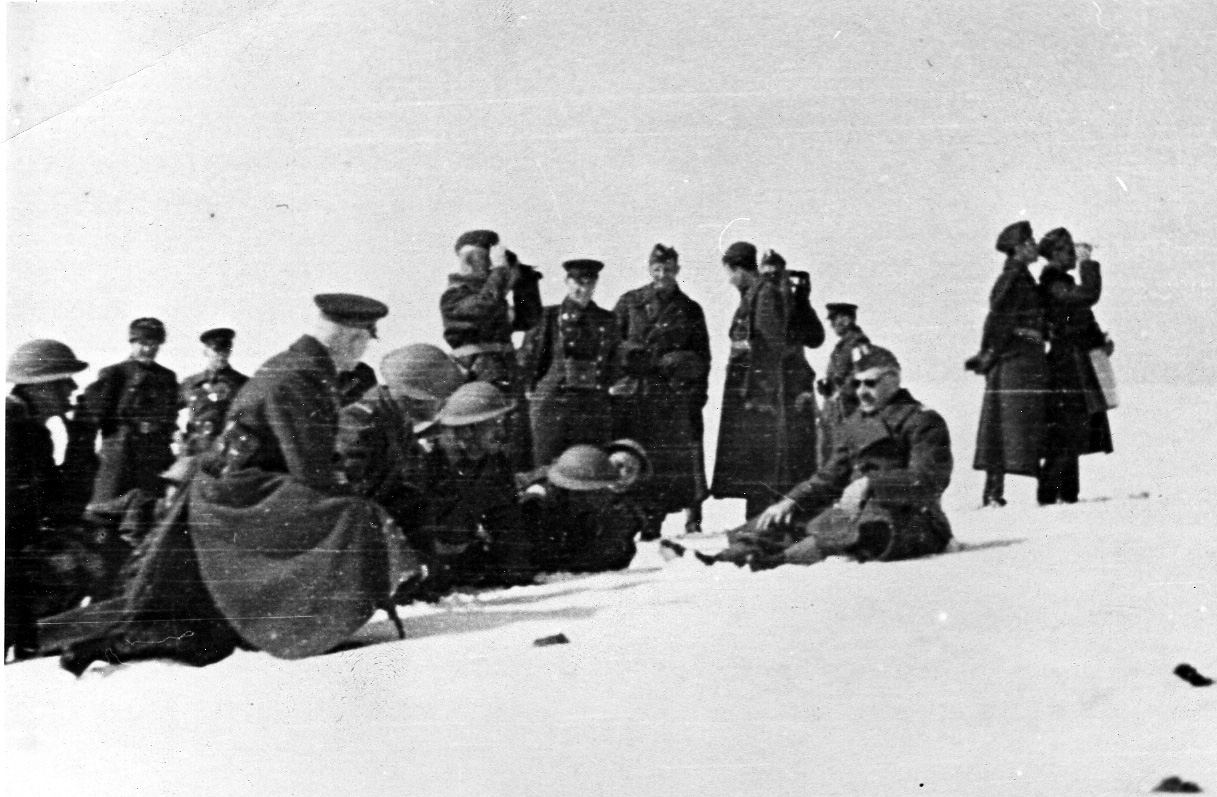
Officers of the Polish and Soviet armies during exercises in the winter of 1941. Władysław Anders is sitting on the right.

The formation began organizing in the Buzuluk area, and recruitment began in the NKVD camps among Polish POWs. By the end of 1941 the new Polish force had recruited 25,000 soldiers (including 1,000 officers), forming three infantry divisions: 5th, 6th and 7th. Menachem Begin (the future leader of the Zionist paramilitary group Irgun, prime minister of Israel and Nobel Peace Prize winner) was among those who joined. In the spring of 1942 the organizing center moved to the area of Tashkent in Uzbekistan and the 8th division was also formed.

The recruitment process met obstacles. Significant numbers of Polish officers were missing as a result of the Katyn massacre (1940), unknown at that time to the Poles. The Soviets did not want citizens of the Second Polish Republic who were not ethnic Poles (such as Jews, Belarusians, Lithuanians and Ukrainians) to be eligible for recruitment. The newly established military units did not receive proper logistical support or supplies. Some administrators of Soviet camps holding the Poles interfered with the already authorized release of their Polish inmates.

The Soviets, coping with the deteriorating war situation, were unable to provide adequate food rations for the growing Polish army, which was sharing its limited provisions with the also growing group of Polish civilian deportees. After the Anglo-Soviet invasion of Iran (August–September 1941), Stalin agreed on 18 March 1942 to evacuate part of the Polish formation as a military force to Iran, and the soldiers transferred across the Caspian Sea from Krasnovodsk to the port of Pahlavi in Iran. Eventually all the soldiers and civilians gathered were allowed to leave the Soviet Union and to enter British-controlled territories.

== Under British command ==
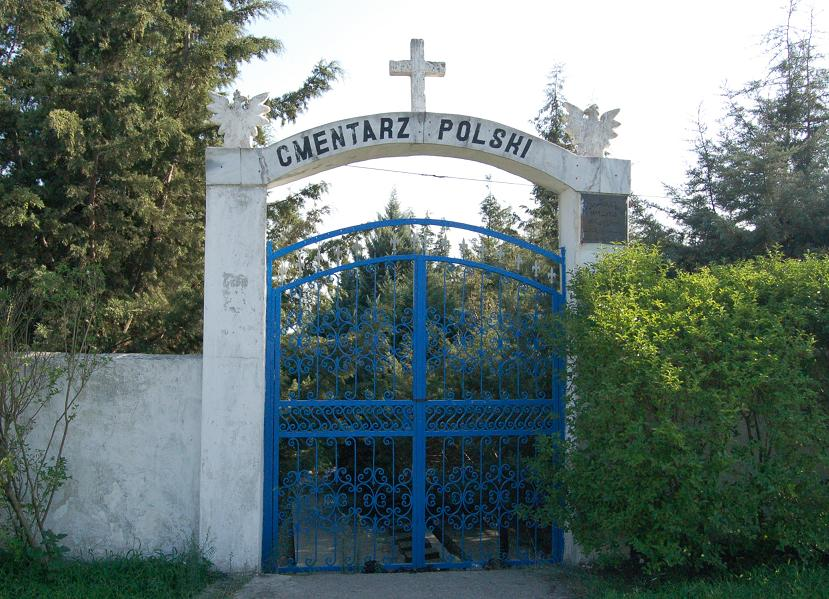
Polish Cemetery in Bandar-e Anzali

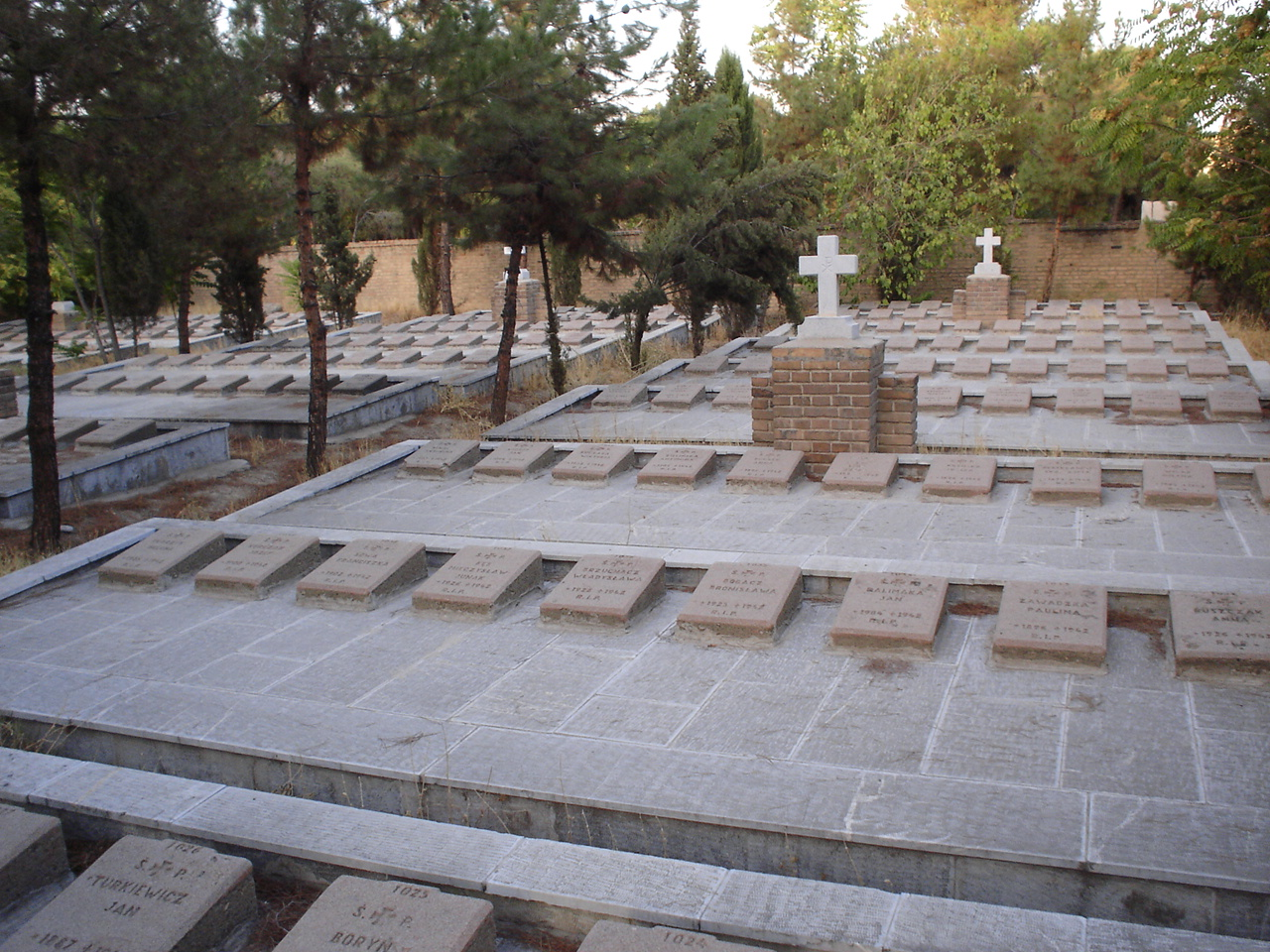
Polish war cemetery in Tehran

More military personnel and civilians were transferred later that summer, up to the end of August, by ship and by an overland route from Ashgabat, Turkmenistan to the railhead in Mashhad, Iran. Thousands of former Polish prisoners walked from the southern border of the Soviet Union to Iran. Many died in the process due to cold weather, hunger, and exhaustion. About 79,000 soldiers and 37,000 civilians – Polish citizens – left the Soviet Union.

Anders' Army was transferred to the operational control of the British government, as part of the British Middle East Command. The unit travelled through Iran, Iraq and Palestine, where many of its soldiers joined the Polish Second Corps, a part of the Polish Armed Forces in the West. With the corps, troops from Anders' Army fought in the Italian Campaign, including the Battle of Monte Cassino. Their contribution is commemorated in Poland in names of streets and other places.

== Jewish soldiers and civilians ==
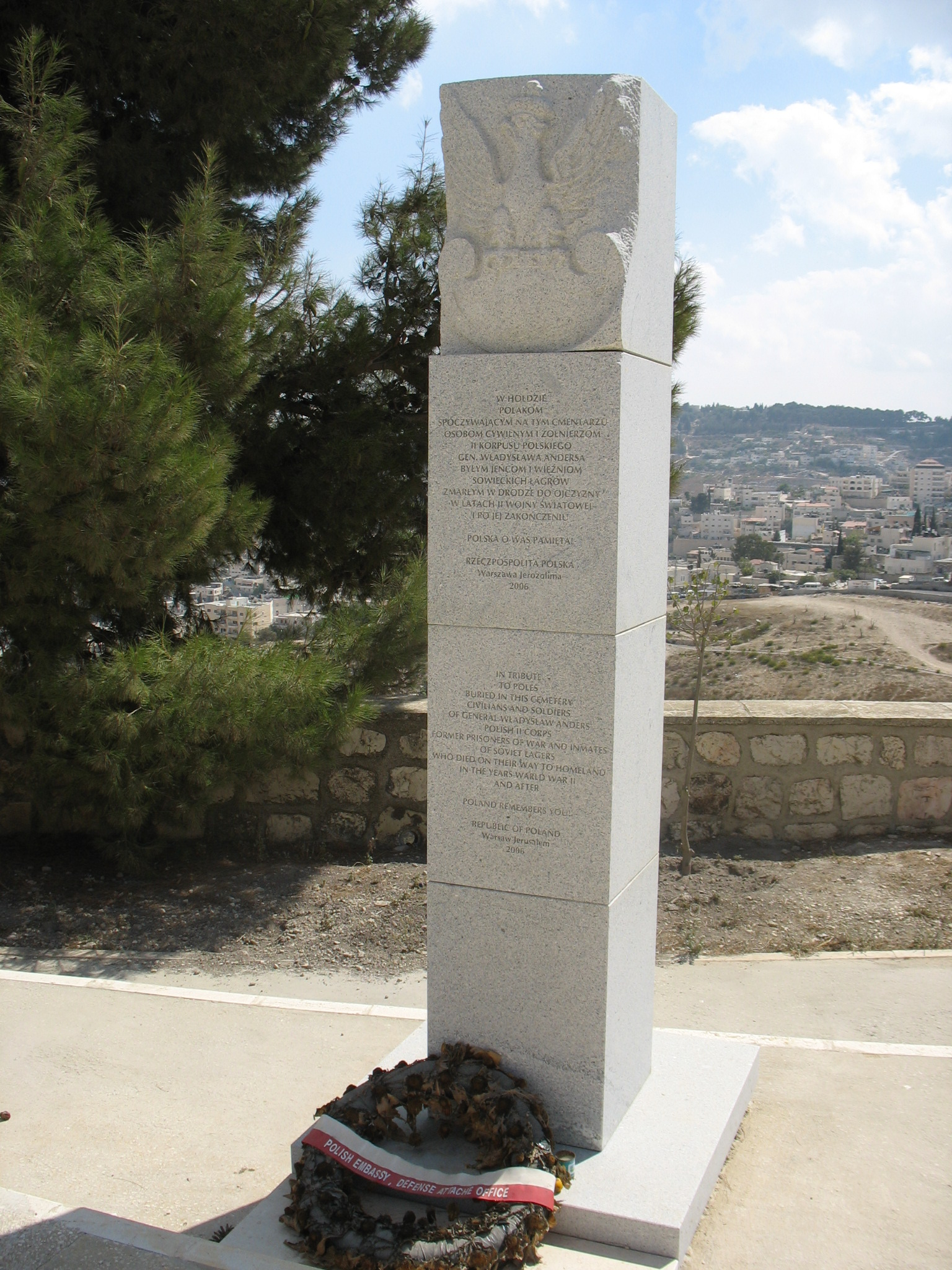
The memorial in Jerusalem

When Anders' Army left the Soviet Union on its journey towards the Middle East, families of the soldiers and groups of Jewish children, war orphans, joined the Jewish soldiers. After arriving in Tehran, Iran, the children were transferred into the hands of the emissaries who brought them to Palestine. Central in obtaining permission for Jewish groups to cross the Iraqi border – permission that had initially been denied – were individuals like Polish Red Cross worker Halina Dmochowska, and prayers were later said for her in various synagogues in Palestine.

When Anders' Army reached Palestine, of its over 4,000 Jewish soldiers, 3,000 left the army.

Of the Jewish officers and men in Anders' Army who fought in the Italian campaign, 28 were killed and 62 were wounded. 136 of Anders' Jewish soldiers were decorated, including 6 Jews who received the Order of the "Virtuti Militari", the highest Polish Military Decoration for Gallantry. In Italy, Jewish and ethnic Polish soldiers of Anders' Army fought alongside Jewish soldiers in British units, including the Jewish Brigade of the British Eighth Army.

In 2006, a memorial to Anders' Army was erected in the Catholic cemetery on Mount Zion in Jerusalem.

== Notable veterans of Anders' Army ==
- Wojtek (1942–1963), mascot bear of the 22nd Artillery Supply Company, 2nd Polish Corps
- Zygmunt Berling (1896–1980), chief of staff of the 5th Division who refused to leave the Soviet Union together with Anders and was sentenced to death in absentia by a military court of Anders' Army on charges of desertion, eventually became the first commander of the 1st Tadeusz Kościuszko Infantry Division and founder of the Polish People's Army
- Menachem Begin (1913–1992), Zionist paramilitary group leader and sixth prime minister of Israel (1977–1983)
- Julian J. Bussgang (1925–2023), mathematician, author of the Bussgang theorem
- Józef Czapski (1896–1993), Polish officer, painter, author, delegated by Anders to investigate the 1940 disappearance of Polish officers in what became known as the Katyn massacre
- Alexander Nadson (1926–2015), post-war Belarusian religious leader and Apostolic Visitor for the Belarusian Greek-Catholic faithful abroad
- Nikodem Sulik (1893–1954), Polish WWII general
- Stanisław Szostak (1898–1961), Polish officer
- Leonid Teliga (1917–1970), Polish sailor and writer, the first Pole to single-handedly circumnavigate the globe
- Vincent Zhuk-Hryshkevich (1903–1989), Belarusian emigre politician, president-in-exile (1971–1982)
