= Jeff Bussgang =

American ventur capitalist

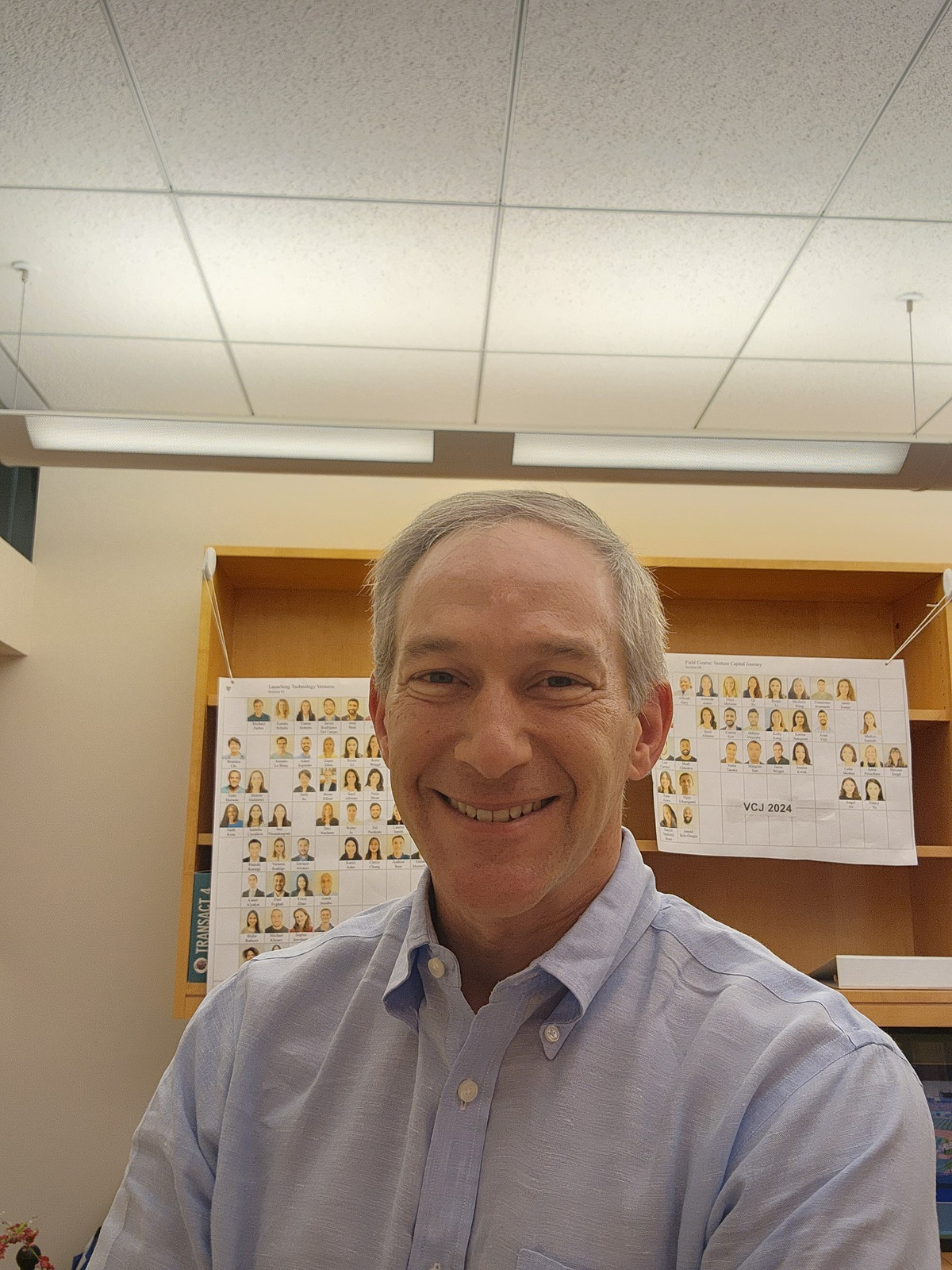
- Bussgang in 2024
- Born: June 20, 1969 (age 57)
- Education: Harvard University (BA, MBA)
- Occupation: Venture capitalist
- Father: Julian J. Bussgang

Jeff Bussgang (born June 20, 1969) is an American entrepreneur, author and general partner at Flybridge Capital Partners, a venture capital investment firm.

== Early life and education ==
Bussgang is the son of Julian J. Bussgang, associated with the eponymous Bussgang theorem. He grew up in the Greater Boston area and graduated from Harvard University with a Bachelor of Arts degree in Computer Science, and an MBA from the Harvard Business School.

== Career ==
Bussgang co-founded Upromise, a loyalty marketing, and financial services firm, serving as its president and COO. He also serves as a senior lecturer at Harvard Business School. He founded The Graduate Syndicate, and is a member of the board of EdX. In 2023, he created an AI chatbot to help Harvard Business School students learn case studies. Bussgang has been included in Boston Magazine's list as 21 most powerful people, the Boston Business Journal’s “Power 50” list, and The Boston Globe's “Top 50 Tech Power Players” in 2024.

== Selected publications ==
=== Journals ===
- Bussgang, Jeffrey; Bacon, Jono (2020-01-21). "When Community Becomes Your Competitive Advantage". Harvard Business Review. ISSN 0017-8012.
- Bussgang, Jeffrey; Montuori, Craig; Brah, William (2019-05-15). "How to Attract Startups and Tech Companies to a City Without Relying on Tax Breaks". Harvard Business Review. ISSN 0017-8012.
- Bussgang, Jeffrey; Nanda, Ramana (2018-11-07). "The Hidden Costs of Initial Coin Offerings". Harvard Business Review. ISSN 0017-8012.
- Bussgang, Jeffrey (2013-07-30). "You Found Your Product-Market Fit. Now What?". Harvard Business Review. ISSN 0017-8012.

=== Books ===
- Bussgang, Jeffrey (2017). Entering Startupland: an essential guide to finding the right job. Boston, Massachusetts: Harvard Business Review Press. ISBN 978-1-63369-384-5.
- Bussgang, Jeff (2010). Mastering the VC Game: A Venture Capital Insider Reveals How to Get from Start-up to IPO on Your Terms. Portfolio. p. 256. ISBN 9781591844440.
- Bussgang, Jeff (2025). The Experimentation Machine: Finding Product-Market Fit in the Age of AI. Damn Gravity Media. p. 270. ISBN 9781962339094.
