= Marc A. Baldo =

American electrical engineer

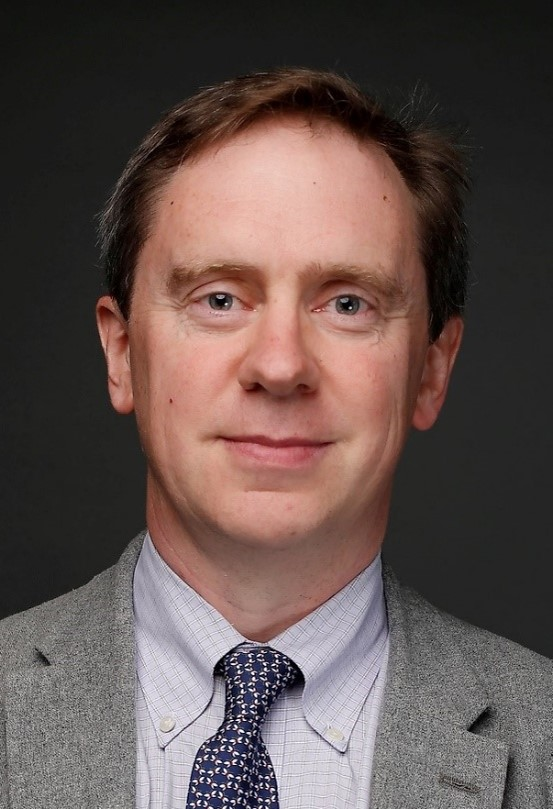
- Education: University of Sydney, Princeton University
- Known for: Development of phosphorescent organic light-emitting diodes
- Awards: Jan Rajchman Prize, Member of National Academy of Engineering
- Scientific career
- Workplaces: Massachusetts Institute of Technology
- Website: https://seegroup.mit.edu/

Marc A. Baldo is an Australian-American engineer and Dugald C. Jackson Professor of Electrical Engineering at the Massachusetts Institute of Technology. He is Director of the Research Laboratory of Electronics. His research focuses on organic electronics, excitonics, light-emitting devices, solar cells, and the transport of electrical charge and excitons in organic materials.

== Education and career ==
Baldo earned a Bachelor of Engineering in electrical engineering from the University of Sydney in 1995, graduating with first-class honors and a university medal. He then moved to Princeton University, where he received an M.A. in 1998 and a Ph.D. in electrical engineering in 2001, working in Stephen R. Forrest's lab.

He joined MIT's Department of Electrical Engineering and Computer Science in 2002. From 2009 to 2019 he directed the Center for Excitonics, a U.S. Department of Energy Energy Frontier Research Center that brought together researchers from MIT, Harvard University, and Brookhaven National Laboratory to develop new materials for solar energy conversion and solid-state lighting. He has served as Director of MIT's Research Laboratory of Electronics since 2017.

== Research ==
While a graduate student in Stephen R. Forrest's lab at Princeton, Baldo demonstrated that phosphorescent materials could harvest triplet excitons in OLEDs, which fluorescent devices could not use for light emission. The result, published in Nature in 1998, is widely cited as the basis for modern high-efficiency phosphorescent OLED displays.

At MIT, Baldo's group has worked on exciton transport in organic semiconductors, spin-dependent processes affecting device efficiency, and organic chemical sensors. As director of the Center for Excitonics, he led work on nanostructured materials for solar energy conversion, including transparent solar cells.

== Honors and awards ==
Baldo received the Jan Rajchman Prize from the Society for Information Display in 2013 for his contributions to phosphorescent organic light-emitting displays.

He was elected to the National Academy of Engineering in 2024 for contributions to efficient light-emitting diodes used in the display industry.
