= Albert G. Hill =

American physicist (1910–1996)

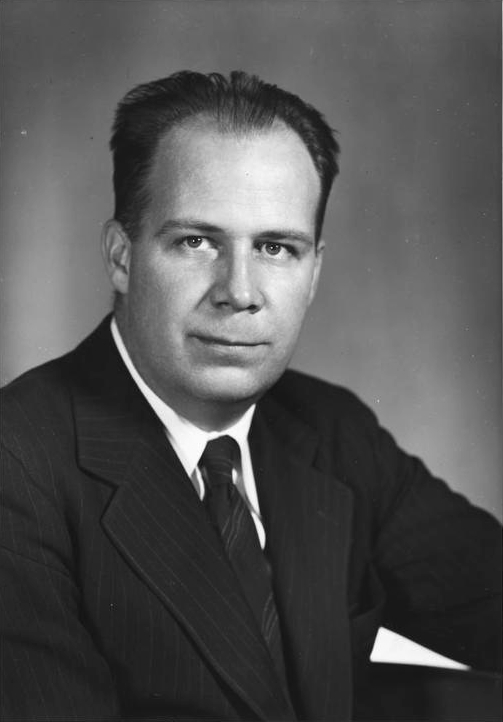
- Born: January 11, 1910; St. Louis, Missouri
- Died: October 21, 1996 (aged 86); Needham, MA
- Education: Washington University in St. Louis; University of Rochester
- Spouses: Ethel Simpson; Ruth Parker Hill
- Scientific career
- Institutions: MIT; Bell Labs; Lincoln Lab; Weapons Systems Evaluation Group
- Doctoral advisor: Lee DuBridge

Albert Gordon Hill (11 January 1910-21 October 1996) was a physicist. He was a key leader in the development of radar in World War II, director of the MIT Lincoln Laboratory development of the electronic Distant Early Warning and SAGE continental air defense systems, and first chairman of The Charles Stark Draper Laboratory.

== Biography ==
Hill was born in St. Louis on Jan. 11, 1910. In 1930 he received the BS in mechanical engineering from the School of Engineering & Applied Science at Washington University in St. Louis and, after serving two years with Bell Telephone Laboratories, an MS in physics there (1934). He received the PhD in physics from the University of Rochester in 1937 under the guidance of Lee Alvin DuBridge.

He was an instructor in physics at MIT from 1937 to 1941, when he became a staff member of the Radiation Laboratory at MIT, which was developing radar for use in World War II. Hill headed the Radio Frequency Group in the Transmitter Components division and by the end of the war was chief of the 800-person division. After the war he became associate director of the newly formed Research Laboratory of Electronics at MIT, and was promoted in 1949 to its director.

Lincoln Lab was formed in 1951 at the request of the government, and Dr. Hill became its second director. During his tenure, Lincoln led the development of the computerized SAGE (Semi-Automatic Ground Environment) air defense system and the Distant Early Warning (DEW) line of radar sets stretching from northern Alaska to Greenland. He helped establish in 1955 the Supreme Headquarters, Allied Powers Europe (SHAPE) Technical Center in The Hague and the NATO Communications Line, extending from northern Norway to eastern Turkey.

In 1956, Hill went to Washington to serve as director for the Weapons Systems Evaluation Group and vice president and director of research for the Institute for Defense Analyses. He returned to MIT in 1959 and resumed teaching physics. In 1965, he also became a lecturer in the department of political science.

In 1970, he was appointed to MIT vice president for research, a new senior position supervising research administration on campus and the special laboratories (Lincoln Lab and the Instrumentation Lab). In May 1970, MIT formally divested itself of the Instrumentation Lab, which under the direction of Charles Stark Draper had developed the gyroscope and the Apollo Guidance Computer that guided Apollo 11 to the moon in July 1969. Dr. Hill, still vice president of research, became the chairman of the independent board of directors of the laboratory, renamed the Charles Stark Draper Laboratory in honor of its founder. Draper Lab remained a division of MIT for three years and became independent in 1973.

In 1984, the Draper Laboratory dedicated the Albert G. Hill Building at One Hampshire Street in Cambridge.

== Advocacy ==
Hill was an important advocate for equal opportunity and affirmative action at MIT, and he personally recruited African-American graduate students and faculty to the MIT Department of Physics. He chaired the committee which began MIT's Office of Minority Education. MIT named the Albert G. Hill Prize for undergraduates in his honor.

== Positions ==
- Professor of Physics, MIT
- Staff, MIT Radiation Laboratory
- Director of the Research Laboratory of Electronics, MIT
- Director, Lincoln Lab
- Chairman, Charles Stark Draper Laboratory

== Honors ==
- Fellow of the American Physical Society, 1941
- Presidential Certificate of Merit, 1948
- Air Force Distinguished Civilian Service Medal, 1955
- Washington University Distinguished Alumni Citation, 1955
- Secretary of Defense Distinguished Civilian Service Medal, 1959
- Washington University School of Engineering Alumni Achievement Award, 1991

== See also ==
- Radiation Laboratory
- Research Laboratory of Electronics at MIT
- Albert Gordon Hill papers, MC-0365. Massachusetts Institute of Technology Department of Distinctive Collections, Cambridge, Massachusetts.
