= Julian J. Bussgang =

Polish-American electronic engineer and mathematician (1925–2023)

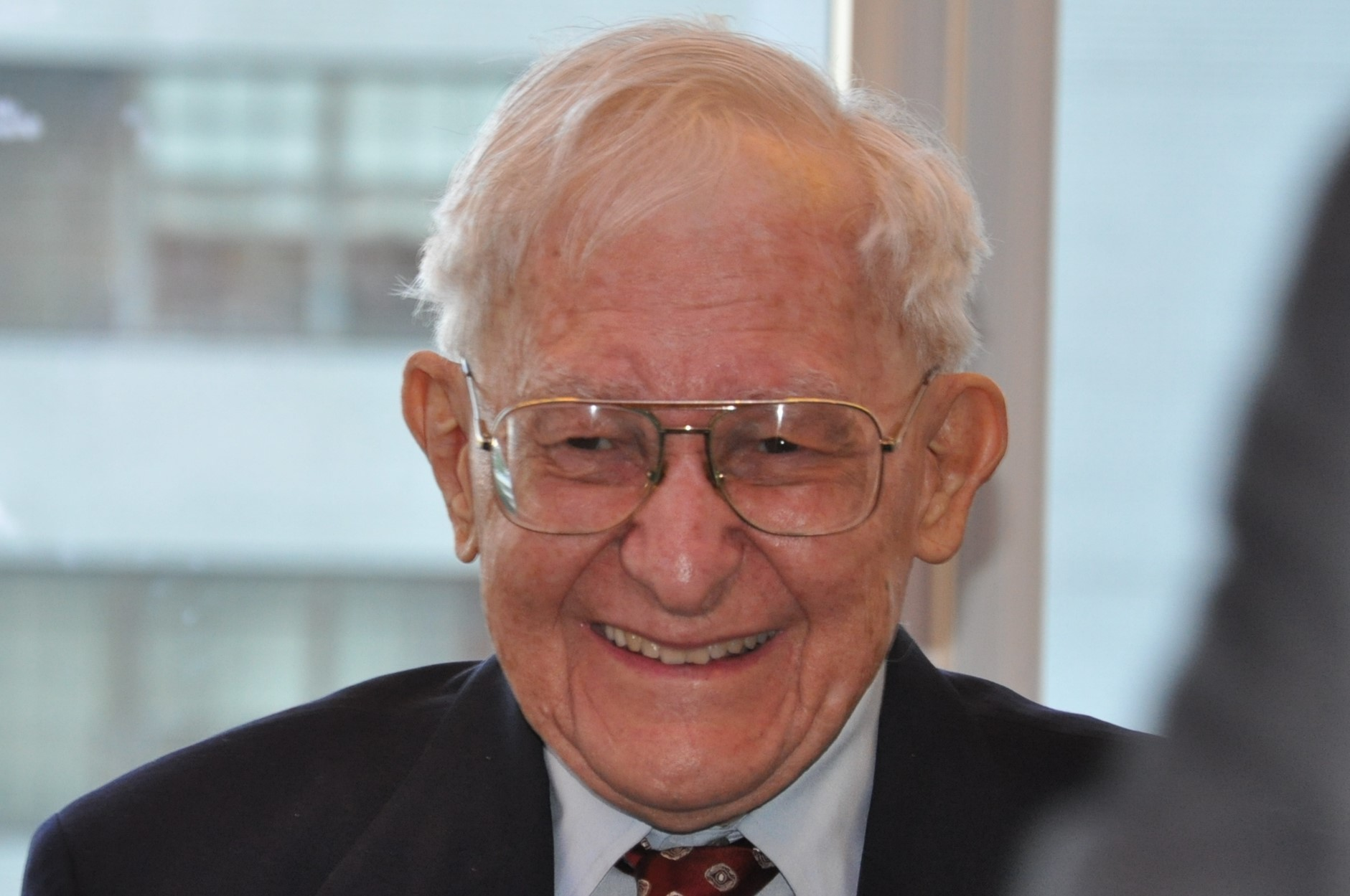
- Born: 26 March 1925; Lwów, Poland
- Died: 16 September 2023 (aged 98); Dedham, Massachusetts, U.S.
- Spouse: Fay Bussgang
- Children: Jessica Edith Bussgang; Julia Claire Bussgang; Jeffrey Joseph Bussgang

Julian Jakub Bussgang (26 March 1925 – 16 September 2023) was a Polish-American electronic engineer and a mathematician. He was most known for publishing the Bussgang theorem and for his work in the field of Applied Physics and communications. He published several technical papers and held six patents.

Bussgang was born in Poland in 1925 into an assimilated Jewish family. Two weeks after the Nazis invaded Poland in September 1939, Bussgang's family fled Poland for fear of religious persecution. For the next decade, Bussgang was a refugee moving from country to country with his family. After serving in the Polish Division of the British Army in World War II, he immigrated to the United States where he established a career in the field of signal processing, information theory, and communications. He founded the high technology firm Signatron Inc. in 1962, which was acquired by Sundstrand Corporation in 1984.

After his retirement, Bussgang volunteered in Warsaw and Kraków with the International Executive Service Corps to help privatize Polish industrial firms. In 2011, President Komorowski presented Bussgang with the Knight’s Cross of the Order of Merit of Poland at The Polish Consulate in New York City for his activities promoting Polish-Jewish dialogue.

Along with his wife, Fay, he translated several books from Polish to English.

== Biography ==
Bussgang was born in Lwów, Poland (now Lviv, Ukraine) on 26 March 1925. After the beginning of World War II, his family migrated to Romania and then to Palestine. Thus, he completed his secondary education at a temporary Polish school in Tel Aviv. Bussgang joined the 2nd Polish Corps, a unit that played a role in the Allied campaign. In 1944, he fought in the Battle for Monte Cassino in Italy, one of the war’s most grueling and pivotal engagements.

When the war in Italy ended, General Anders arranged for the qualified Polish soldiers to enter Italian universities and make up for the time they had lost while fighting during the war. Thus, Bussgang enrolled at the Polytechnic University of Turin and completed the first year of engineering in an accelerated course.

When the Allies wanted Italy to return to normalcy, they decided to move the Polish soldiers out of Italy. They gave them the choice of either going back to Poland or to England. Bussgang decided to go to England, where he entered Polish University College, a temporary school created in order to qualify its students to take University of London exams. In 1949, Bussgang received his US visa after waiting several years. Later that year, he completed his B.Sc.(Eng.) from the University of London, taking his final exam in New York City.

== Career ==
Bussgang immigrated to the United States in 1949. He went to MIT and received his MSEE in 1951. His thesis was the Bussgang theorem first published as an RLE Report. After his graduation, he began working at MIT Lincoln Laboratory. Later, alongside his work at Lincoln Laboratory, he enrolled at Harvard for a PhD in Applied Physics, which he received in 1955. After he graduated, he joined the RCA Aerospace Division in Waltham, MA (later in Burlington, MA). He started as an engineer but then was promoted first as Group Leader, then as Manager of Radar Development, and later became Manager of Applied Research.

=== Signatron ===
In 1962, Bussgang left RCA and founded Signatron Inc., an electronics firm located in Lexington. Under Dr. Bussgang, Signatron undertook several projects. The company developed troposcatter modems, radio channel simulators, and a satellite system for measuring continental drift. Dr. Bussgang served as a consultant to Grumman Aircraft on the selection, simulation, and evaluation of Rendezvous Radar and Landing Radar for the Apollo Lunar Module, which facilitated the first human moon landing. Signatron also played a role in the development of Raytheon’s Patriot missile system. Over his career Bussgang earned six patents and maintained a top-secret security clearance for his contributions to defense technology.

In 1984, he sold Signatron to the aerospace firm Sundstrand Corporation but was asked to stay with the company for three more years, so he retired in 1987.

=== Other activities ===
in 1962, He began teaching a course at Northeastern University and continued until 1965. He also taught a course at Harvard from 1964 to 1965.

Bussgang also served as a consultant to Honeywell, Hughes Aircraft, Philco-Ford, IBM, Arthur D. Little, Raytheon Company, RCA, and Sperry Univac among others. After retirement, Bussgang volunteered twice in Warsaw and once in Kraków with International Executive Service Corps to help privatize Polish industrial firms. In May 2014, he was promoted to the rank of Captain (inactive) in the Polish Army. In 2011, President Komorowski presented Bussgang with the Knight’s Cross of the Order of Merit of the Republic of Poland at the Polish Consulate in New York City, for his activities promoting Polish-Jewish dialogue.

Bussgang served as Associate Editor of Radio Science, from 1976 to 1978, and was a member of the Board of Overseers of the Museum of Science in Boston, from 1989 to 1995.

=== IEEE ===
Bussgang was active in the Institute of Electrical and Electronics Engineers – IEEE – [formerly IRE] from 1952. He served on the IEEE Life Members Committee and as a reviewer on various IEEE Transactions. He served on the Boston Section's Fellows and Awards Committee and was also the Education Chair. In 1989, he became Chair of the Boston Section of IEEE. He served in these positions until 1993. From 1995 to 2007, he was the Boston Section representative to the Central New England Council of IEEE. He was twice elected to three-year terms on the Board of Governors of the IEEE Information Theory Society. He was the nominator for the Liquid Crystal Display (LCD) Milestone and was given the regional professional leadership award by IEEE in 1995.

=== Books and papers ===
Bussgang wrote over twenty scientific papers and prepared two books that have not yet been published. One is a monograph with David Middleton on Truncated Sequential Tests, the other is Signal Detection and Estimation; Problems and Solutions with Nicolas Johnson. In 1994, his own story – Haunting Memories – was published as a chapter in We Shall Not Forget! Memories of the Holocaust. With his wife, Fay, he translated from Polish to English two volumes of The Last Eyewitnesses: Children of the Holocaust Speak – in 1998 and in 2005. These books, originally published by the Association of the Children of the Holocaust in Poland, contain testimonies by different authors highlighting experiences during World War II. In 2010, he translated from Polish to English the book, Polish Jew-Polish Soldier: 1939–1945, a collection of essays first published in the UK in 1945 by a Jewish chaplain of the Polish Army 2nd Corps.

Bussgang and his wife were the founders and editors of Gazeta, a quarterly publication of the American Association for Polish-Jewish Studies, they published it over twenty years and it was published by the Taube Foundation for Jewish Life & Culture.

=== Bussgang Theorem ===
The Bussgang theorem, introduced by Bussgang in 1952, is a foundational result in stochastic analysis, particularly in the study of signal processing. While completing his graduate studies at the Massachusetts Institute of Technology (MIT), Bussgang formalized the theorem, which has since become an essential tool in understanding nonlinear systems affected by Gaussian processes.

=== Contributions and applications ===
Bussgang's work has had implications in the fields of applied mathematics and electrical engineering. The theorem simplifies the analysis of complex systems involving nonlinear operations by leveraging the statistical properties of Gaussian signals. His theorem is used to model the behavior of systems where signals pass through nonlinear elements, enabling more efficient filter design.

In digital and wireless communication, the Bussgang theorem provides a framework for evaluating the performance of modulation and demodulation processes.

== Death ==
Julian J. Bussgang died at his home in Dedham, Massachusetts, on 16 September 2023, at the age of 98.

== Awards and honors ==
- 1973 – Fellow of IEEE
- 1995 – IEEE-USA Regional Professional Leadership Award by IEEE
- 2000 – IEEE Third Millennium Medal
- 2005 – IEEE Boston Section Distinguished Service Award
- 2011 – Knight's Cross of the Order of Merit of the Republic of Poland

== Bibliography ==
- A Monograph on Truncated Sequential Tests (1967); to be published.
- Translator: The Last Eyewitnesses: Children of the Holocaust Speak (Jewish Lives) (1998) ISBN 978-0810115118
- Translator: The Last Eyewitnesses, Volume 2: The Children of the Holocaust Speak (Jewish Lives) (2005) ISBN 978-0810122390
- Translator: Polish Jew-Polish Soldier: 1939–1945 (2010) ISBN 978-8361850328
- Co-Editor: DZIALOSZYCE Memorial Book – an English translation of Sefer Yizkor shel kehilat Dzialoshitz ve-ha-seviva (2012) ISBN 978-0976475989
- The chapter Consulting Services in How to Start Your Own Business, William Putt, Editor, MIT Technology Press, 1974.
- Refugee, Soldier, Student: A Memoir (2020)
- Narrator: I Refused to Die: Stories of Boston-Area Holocaust Survivors and Soldiers Who Liberated the Concentration Camps of World War II
- A Joint Memoir

=== Selected publications ===
- Chapter: “David Middleton” in L. Cohen, H. V. Poor, and M. O. Scully, Classical, Semi-classical and Quantum Noise, Springer, New York, pp. 1–7, 2011
- J. J. Bussgang and S. A. Parl, chapter “HF Communications” in John G. Proakis ed., Wiley Encyclopedia of Telecommunications, vol. 2, John Wiley & Sons, Hoboken, NJ, 2003, pp. 946–958.
- J. M. Zagami, S. A. Parl, J. J. Bussgang, and K. Devereaux Melillo, Providing Universal Location Services Using a Wireless E911 Location Network, IEEE Communications Magazine, vol. 36, no. 4, pp. 66–71, April 1998.
- J. J. Bussgang, E. H. Getchell, B. Goldberg and P. F. Mahoney, Stored channel simulation of tactical VHF radio links, IEEE Trans. Communications, vol. 24, no. 2, pp. 154–163, Feb. 1976.
- J. J. Bussgang, L. Ehrman, and J. W. Graham, Analysis of nonlinear systems with multiple inputs, Proc. IEEE, v. 62, no. 8, pp. 1088–1119, Aug. 1974.
- J. J. Bussgang, P. Nesbeda, and H. Safran, Unified analysis of range performance of C-W and Pulse Doppler Radar, Proc. IRE, v. 47(10), Oct. 1959, also v. 48, Oct. 1960; Reprinted in D. Barton, Radar Equation, Artech House, 1974.
- J. J. Bussgang and M. Leiter, Error Performance of Quadrature Pilot Tone Phase-Shift Keying, IEEE Trans. Communication Technology, vol. 16, no. 4, pp. 526–529, August 1968.
- J. J. Bussgang and M. Leiter, Error performance of differential phase-shift transmission over a telephone line, IEEE Trans. Communication Technology, vol. 16, no. 3, pp. 411–419, June 1968.
- J. J.Bussgang and D. S. O. Middleton, “Optimum sequential detection of signals in noise,” IEEE Trans. Info. Theory, vol. IT-1, pp. 5 – 18, Dec. 1955. Reprinted in S. S. Haykin, Detection and Estimation: Applications to Radar (Benchmark papers in electrical engineering and computer science; 13), Dowden, Hutchinson and Ross, 1975.
- J. J. Bussgang, “Crosscorrelation functions of amplitude-distorted Gaussian signals,” MIT-RLE Technical Report #216, pp. 1–14, March 1952, reprinted: A. H. Haddad, Nonlinear Systems, Benchmark Papers, vol.10, Halsted Press, 1975.
- J. J. Bussgang, L. Ehrman & J. W. Graham, "Analysis of nonlinear systems with multiple inputs," Proc. IEEE, v. 62, #8, 1974.
- J. J. Bussgang, “Some properties of binary convolutional code generators,” IEEE Trans. Info. Theory, v. 11, #1, 1965.
