= Bussgang theorem =

Mathematical theorem (stochastic analysis)

In mathematics, the Bussgang theorem is a theorem of stochastic analysis. The theorem states that the cross-correlation between a Gaussian signal before and after it has passed through a nonlinear operation are equal to the signals auto-correlation up to a constant. It was first published by Julian J. Bussgang in 1952 while he was at the Massachusetts Institute of Technology.

== Statement ==
Let $\left\{X(t)\right\}$ be a zero-mean stationary Gaussian random process and $\left \{ Y(t) \right\} = g(X(t))$ where $g(\cdot)$ is a nonlinear amplitude distortion.

If $R_X(\tau)$ is the autocorrelation function of $\left\{ X(t) \right\}$, then the cross-correlation function of $\left\{ X(t) \right\}$ and $\left\{ Y(t) \right\}$ is

$$R_{XY}(\tau) = CR_X(\tau),$$

where $C$ is a constant that depends only on $g(\cdot)$.

It can be further shown that

$$C = \frac{1}{\sigma^3\sqrt{2\pi}}\int_{-\infty}^\infty ug(u)e^{-\frac{u^2}{2\sigma^2}} \, du.$$

== Derivation for One-bit Quantization ==
It is a property of the two-dimensional normal distribution that the joint density of $y_1$ and $y_2$ depends only on their covariance and is given explicitly by the expression

$$p(y_1,y_2) = \frac{1}{2 \pi \sqrt{1-\rho^2}} e^{-\frac{y_1^2 + y_2^2 - 2 \rho y_1 y_2}{2(1-\rho^2)}}$$

where $y_1$ and $y_2$ are standard Gaussian random variables with correlation $\phi_{y_1y_2}=\rho$.

Assume that $r_2 = Q(y_2)$, the correlation between $y_1$ and $r_2$ is,

$$\phi_{y_1r_2} = \frac{1}{2 \pi \sqrt{1-\rho^2}} \int_{-\infty}^{\infty} \int_{-\infty}^{\infty} y_1 Q(y_2) e^{-\frac{y_1^2 + y_2^2 - 2 \rho y_1 y_2}{2(1-\rho^2)}} \, dy_1 dy_2$$.

Since

$$\int_{-\infty}^{\infty} y_1 e^{-\frac{1}{2(1-\rho^2)} y_1^2 + \frac{\rho y_2}{1-\rho^2} y_1 } \, dy_1 = \rho \sqrt{2 \pi (1-\rho^2)} y_2 e^{ \frac{\rho^2 y_2^2}{2(1-\rho^2)} }$$,

the correlation $\phi_{y_1 r_2}$ may be simplified as

$$\phi_{y_1 r_2} = \frac{\rho}{\sqrt{2 \pi}} \int_{-\infty}^{\infty} y_2 Q(y_2) e^{-\frac{y_2^2}{2}} \, dy_2$$.

The integral above is seen to depend only on the distortion characteristic $Q()$ and is independent of $\rho$.

Remembering that $\rho=\phi_{y_1 y_2}$, we observe that for a given distortion characteristic $Q()$, the ratio $\frac{\phi_{y_1 r_2}}{\phi_{y_1 y_2}}$ is $K_Q=\frac{1}{\sqrt{2\pi}} \int_{-\infty}^{\infty} y_2 Q(y_2) e^{-\frac{y_2^2}{2}} \, dy_2$.

Therefore, the correlation can be rewritten in the form

$\phi_{y_1 r_2} = K_Q \phi_{y_1 y_2}$.

The above equation is the mathematical expression of the stated "Bussgang‘s theorem".

If $Q(x) = \text{sign}(x)$, or called one-bit quantization, then $K_Q= \frac{2}{\sqrt{2\pi}} \int_{0}^{\infty} y_2 e^{-\frac{y_2^2}{2}} \, dy_2 = \sqrt{\frac{2}{\pi}}$.

== Arcsine law ==
If the two random variables are both distorted, i.e., $r_1 = Q(y_1), r_2 = Q(y_2)$, the correlation of $r_1$ and $r_2$ is

$\phi_{r_1 r_2}=\int_{-\infty}^{\infty}\int_{-\infty}^{\infty} Q(y_1) Q(y_2) p(y_1, y_2) \, dy_1 dy_2$.

When $Q(x) = \text{sign}(x)$, the expression becomes,

$\phi_{r_1 r_2}=\frac{1}{2\pi \sqrt{1-\rho^2}} \left[ \int_{0}^{\infty} \int_{0}^{\infty} e^{-\alpha} \, dy_1 dy_2 + \int_{-\infty}^{0} \int_{-\infty}^{0} e^{-\alpha} \, dy_1 dy_2 - \int_{0}^{\infty} \int_{-\infty}^{0} e^{-\alpha} \, dy_1 dy_2 - \int_{-\infty}^{0} \int_{0}^{\infty} e^{-\alpha} \, dy_1 dy_2 \right]$

where $\alpha = \frac{y_1^2 + y_2^2 - 2\rho y_1 y_2}{2 (1-\rho^2)}$.

Noticing that

$\int_{-\infty}^{\infty} \int_{-\infty}^{\infty} p(y_1,y_2) \, dy_1 dy_2 = \frac{1}{2\pi \sqrt{1-\rho^2}} \left[ \int_{0}^{\infty} \int_{0}^{\infty} e^{-\alpha} \, dy_1 dy_2 + \int_{-\infty}^{0} \int_{-\infty}^{0} e^{-\alpha} \, dy_1 dy_2 + \int_{0}^{\infty} \int_{-\infty}^{0} e^{-\alpha} \, dy_1 dy_2 + \int_{-\infty}^{0} \int_{0}^{\infty} e^{-\alpha} \, dy_1 dy_2 \right]=1$,

and $\int_{0}^{\infty} \int_{0}^{\infty} e^{-\alpha} \, dy_1 dy_2 = \int_{-\infty}^{0} \int_{-\infty}^{0} e^{-\alpha} \, dy_1 dy_2$, $\int_{0}^{\infty} \int_{-\infty}^{0} e^{-\alpha} \, dy_1 dy_2 = \int_{-\infty}^{0} \int_{0}^{\infty} e^{-\alpha} \, dy_1 dy_2$,

we can simplify the expression of $\phi_{r_1r_2}$ as

$\phi_{r_1 r_2}=\frac{4}{2\pi \sqrt{1-\rho^2}} \int_{0}^{\infty} \int_{0}^{\infty} e^{-\alpha} \, dy_1 dy_2-1$

Also, it is convenient to introduce the polar coordinate $y_1 = R \cos \theta, y_2 = R \sin \theta$. It is thus found that

$\phi_{r_1 r_2} =\frac{4}{2\pi \sqrt{1-\rho^2}} \int_{0}^{\pi/2} \int_{0}^{\infty} e^{-\frac{R^2 - 2R^2 \rho \cos \theta \sin \theta \ }{2(1-\rho^2)}} R \, dR d\theta-1=\frac{4}{2\pi \sqrt{1-\rho^2}} \int_{0}^{\pi/2} \int_{0}^{\infty} e^{-\frac{R^2 (1-\rho \sin 2\theta )}{2(1-\rho^2)}} R \, dR d\theta -1$.

Integration gives

$\phi_{r_1 r_2}=\frac{2\sqrt{1-\rho^2}}{\pi} \int_{0}^{\pi/2} \frac{d\theta}{1-\rho \sin 2\theta} - 1= - \frac{2}{\pi} \arctan \left( \frac{\rho-\tan\theta} {\sqrt{1-\rho^2}} \right) \Bigg|_{0}^{\pi/2} -1 =\frac{2}{\pi} \arcsin(\rho)$，

This is called "Arcsine law", which was first found by J. H. Van Vleck in 1943 and republished in 1966. The "Arcsine law" can also be proved in a simpler way by applying Price's Theorem.

The function $f(x)=\frac{2}{\pi} \arcsin x$ can be approximated as $f(x) \approx \frac{2}{\pi} x$ when $x$ is small.

=== Price's Theorem ===
Given two jointly normal random variables $y_1$ and $y_2$ with joint probability function

${\displaystyle p(y_{1},y_{2})={\frac {1}{2\pi {\sqrt {1-\rho ^{2}}}}}e^{-{\frac {y_{1}^{2}+y_{2}^{2}-2\rho y_{1}y_{2}}{2(1-\rho ^{2})}}}}$,

we form the mean

$I(\rho)=E(g(y_1,y_2))=\int_{-\infty}^{+\infty} \int_{-\infty}^{+\infty} g(y_1, y_2) p(y_1, y_2) \, dy_1 dy_2$

of some function $g(y_1,y_2)$ of $(y_1, y_2)$. If $g(y_1, y_2) p(y_1, y_2) \rightarrow 0$ as $(y_1, y_2) \rightarrow 0$, then

$\frac{\partial^n I(\rho)}{\partial \rho^n}=\int_{-\infty}^{\infty} \int_{-\infty}^{\infty} \frac{\partial ^{2n} g(y_1, y_2)}{\partial y_1^n \partial y_2^n} p(y_1, y_2) \, dy_1 dy_2 =E \left(\frac{\partial ^{2n} g(y_1, y_2)}{\partial y_1^n \partial y_2^n} \right)$.

Proof. The joint characteristic function of the random variables $y_1$ and $y_2$ is by definition the integral

$\Phi(\omega_1, \omega_2)=\int_{-\infty}^{\infty}\int_{-\infty}^{\infty} p(y_1, y_2) e^{j (\omega_1 y_1 + \omega_2 y_2 )} \, dy_1 dy_2 = \exp \left\{-\frac{\omega_1^2 + \omega_2^2 + 2\rho \omega_1 \omega_2}{2} \right\}$.

From the two-dimensional inversion formula of Fourier transform, it follows that

$p(y_1, y_2) = \frac{1}{4 \pi^2} \int_{-\infty}^{\infty} \int_{-\infty}^{\infty} \Phi(\omega_1, \omega_2) e^{-j (\omega_1 y_1 + \omega_2 y_2)} \, d\omega_1 d\omega_2 =\frac{1}{4 \pi^2} \int_{-\infty}^{\infty} \int_{-\infty}^{\infty} \exp \left\{-\frac{\omega_1^2 + \omega_2^2 + 2\rho \omega_1 \omega_2}{2} \right\} e^{-j (\omega_1 y_1 + \omega_2 y_2)} \, d\omega_1 d\omega_2$.

Therefore, plugging the expression of $p(y_1, y_2)$ into $I(\rho)$, and differentiating with respect to $\rho$, we obtain

$$\begin{align}
\frac{\partial^n I(\rho)}{\partial \rho^n} & =
\int_{-\infty}^{\infty} \int_{-\infty}^{\infty} g(y_1, y_2) p(y_1, y_2) \, dy_1 dy_2 \\
& =
\int_{-\infty}^{\infty} \int_{-\infty}^{\infty} g(y_1, y_2)
\left(\frac{1}{4 \pi^2} \int_{-\infty}^{\infty} \int_{-\infty}^{\infty} \frac{\partial^ {n}\Phi(\omega_1, \omega_2)}{\partial \rho^n}
e^{-j(\omega_1 y_1 + \omega_2 y_2)} \, d\omega_1 d\omega_2 \right)
\, dy_1 dy_2 \\
& =
\int_{-\infty}^{\infty} \int_{-\infty}^{\infty} g(y_1, y_2)
\left(\frac{(-1)^n}{4 \pi^2} \int_{-\infty}^{\infty} \int_{-\infty}^{\infty} \omega_1^n \omega_2^n \Phi(\omega_1, \omega_2)
e^{-j(\omega_1 y_1 + \omega_2 y_2)} \, d\omega_1 d\omega_2 \right)
\, dy_1 dy_2 \\
& =
\int_{-\infty}^{\infty} \int_{-\infty}^{\infty} g(y_1, y_2)
\left(\frac{1}{4 \pi^2} \int_{-\infty}^{\infty} \int_{-\infty}^{\infty} \Phi(\omega_1, \omega_2)
\frac{\partial^{2n} e^{-j(\omega_1 y_1 + \omega_2 y_2)}}{\partial y_1^n \partial y_2^n} \, d\omega_1 d\omega_2 \right)
\, dy_1 dy_2 \\
& =
\int_{-\infty}^{\infty} \int_{-\infty}^{\infty} g(y_1, y_2)
\frac{\partial^{2n} p(y_1, y_2)}{\partial y_1^n \partial y_2^n}
\, dy_1 dy_2 \\
\end{align}$$

After repeated integration by parts and using the condition at $\infty$, we obtain the Price's theorem.

$$\begin{align}
\frac{\partial^n I(\rho)}{\partial \rho^n} & =
\int_{-\infty}^{\infty} \int_{-\infty}^{\infty} g(y_1, y_2)
\frac{\partial^{2n} p(y_1, y_2)}{\partial y_1^n \partial y_2^n}
\, dy_1 dy_2 \\
& = \int_{-\infty}^{\infty} \int_{-\infty}^{\infty}
\frac{\partial^{2} g(y_1, y_2)}{\partial y_1 \partial y_2}
\frac{\partial^{2n-2} p(y_1, y_2)}{\partial y_1^{n-1} \partial y_2^{n-1}}
\, dy_1 dy_2
\\
&=\cdots \\
&=\int_{-\infty}^{\infty} \int_{-\infty}^{\infty}
\frac{\partial ^{2n} g(y_1, y_2)}{\partial y_1^n \partial y_2^n} p(y_1, y_2) \, dy_1 dy_2
\end{align}$$

=== Proof of Arcsine law by Price's Theorem ===
If $g(y_1, y_2) = \text{sign}(y_1) \text{sign} (y_2)$, then $\frac{\partial^2 g(y_1, y_2)}{\partial y_1 \partial y_2} = 4 \delta(y_1) \delta(y_2)$ where $\delta()$ is the Dirac delta function.

Substituting into Price's Theorem, we obtain,

$\frac{\partial E(\text{sign} (y_1) \text{sign}(y_2))}{\partial \rho} = \frac{\partial I(\rho)}{\partial \rho}= \int_{-\infty}^{\infty} \int_{-\infty}^{\infty} 4 \delta(y_1) \delta(y_2) p(y_1, y_2) \, dy_1 dy_2=\frac{2}{\pi \sqrt{1-\rho^2}}$.

When $\rho=0$, $I(\rho)=0$. Thus

$E \left(\text{sign}(y_1) \text{sign}(y_2) \right) = I(\rho)=\frac{2}{\pi} \int_{0}^{\rho} \frac{1}{\sqrt{1-\rho^2}} \, d\rho=\frac{2}{\pi} \arcsin(\rho)$,

which is Van Vleck's well-known result of "Arcsine law".

== Application ==
This theorem implies that a simplified correlator can be designed. Instead of having to multiply two signals, the cross-correlation problem reduces to the gating of one signal with another.
