= Canonization of Pope John XXIII and Pope John Paul II =

Roman Catholic ceremony declaring two popes as saints

Saints John XXIII and John Paul II Bishops of Rome
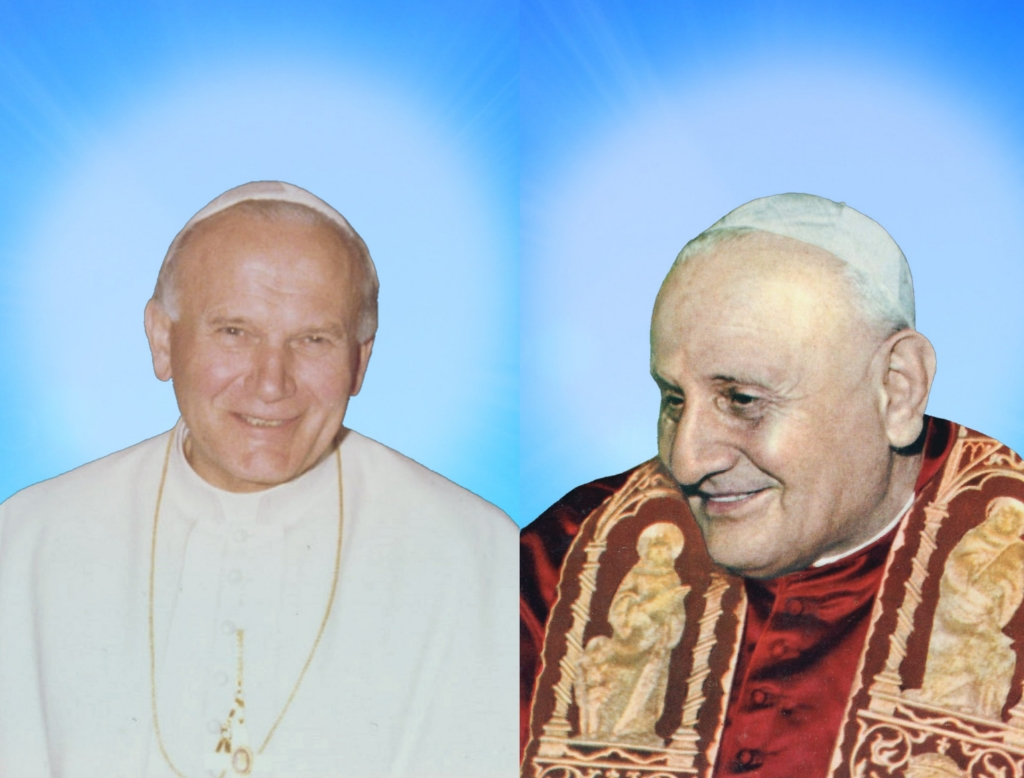
- Portraits of Popes John Paul II (left) and John XXIII (right)

Popes
- Born: John XXIII: 25 November 1881; Sotto il Monte, Kingdom of Italy; John Paul II: 18 May 1920; Wadowice, Republic of Poland
- Died: John XXIII: 3 June 1963; Apostolic Palace, Vatican City; John Paul II: 2 April 2005; Apostolic Palace, Vatican City
- Venerated in: John XXIII: Anglican Church of Canada; Evangelical Lutheran Church in America; Roman Catholic Church; John Paul II: Roman Catholic Church
- Canonized: 27 April 2014, Saint Peter's Square, Vatican City by Pope Francis
- Feast: John XXIII: 11 October; John Paul II: 22 October
- Patronage: John XXIII: Patriarchate of Venice, Papal delegates, Second Vatican Council, Christian unity John Paul II: Archdiocese of Krakow, World Youth Day, young Catholics, families, Swidnica, Wadowice

Pope John XXIII (25 November 1881 – 3 June 1963) and Pope John Paul II (18 May 1920 – 2 April 2005) each served as head of the Catholic Church and sovereign of Vatican City, from 1958 to 1963 and 1978 to 2005 respectively. Their canonizations were held on 27 April 2014. The decision to canonize was made official by Pope Francis on 5 July 2013 following the recognition of a miracle attributed to the intercession of John Paul II, while John XXIII was canonized for his merits of opening the Second Vatican Council. The date of the canonization was assigned on 30 September 2013.

The Canonization Mass was celebrated by Pope Francis (with Pope Emeritus Benedict XVI concelebrating), on 27 April 2014 (Divine Mercy Sunday), in St. Peter's Square (Pope John Paul had died on the vigil of Divine Mercy Sunday in 2005). About 150 cardinals and 700 bishops concelebrated the Mass, and at least 500,000 people attended the Mass with an estimated 300,000 others watching from video screens placed around Rome. This was the only recorded Mass in Church history where a former and current Pope both participated.

== People present at the canonization ==
Delegations from over a hundred States or international organizations were present for the canonization in Rome, including 19 heads of state and 24 heads of government.

Country	Title	Dary
Liechtenstein	Prince and Princess	Hans-Adam II, Prince of Liechtenstein and Marie, Princess of Liechtenstein
Andorra	Co-Prince	Joan Enric Vives Sicília
Belgium	Former Monarchs	King Albert II and Queen Paola
Spain	Monarchs	King Juan Carlos I and Queen Sofía
Australia	Minister for Education	Christopher Pyne
Hungary	President	János Áder
Hungary	Prime Minister	Viktor Orbán
Slovakia	President	Ivan Gašparovič
Slovakia	Prime Minister	Robert Fico
Paraguay	President	Horacio Cartes
Lithuania	President	Dalia Grybauskaitė
Lithuania	Prime Minister	Algirdas Butkevicius
Lebanon	President	Michel Suleiman
Lebanon	Prime Minister	Tammam Salam
Kosovo	President	Atifete Jahjaga
Honduras	President	Juan Orlando Hernández
Equatorial Guinea	President	Teodoro Obiang Nguema Mbasogo
Gabon	President	Ali Bongo Ondimba
El Salvador	President	Mauricio Funes
El Salvador	Vice President and President-elect	Salvador Sánchez Cerén
Ecuador	President	Rafael Correa
Cameroon	President	Paul Biya
Bosnia and Herzegovina	President	Bakir Izetbegovic
Argentina	President of the Chamber of Deputies	Julián Domínguez
Mexico	First Lady	Angélica Rivera
United States	Special Advisor to the President	John Podesta
Ireland	Taoiseach	Enda Kenny
Venezuela	Minister of Foreign Affairs	Elías Jaua
Ukraine	Minister of Foreign Affairs	Andrii Deshchytsia
Zimbabwe	President	Robert Mugabe
Luxembourg	Grand Duke	Henri, Grand Duke of Luxembourg
Croatia	President	Ivo Josipović
Croatia	Prime Minister	Zoran Milanović
Bulgaria	President	Rosen Plevneliev
Bulgaria	Royal family	Tsar Simeon II, former Prime Minister Queen Margarita; Princess Marie Louise of Bulgaria
Taiwan	Vice President	Wu Den-yih (吳敦義)
France	Prime Minister	Manuel Valls
France	Former First Lady	Bernadette Chirac
France	Former Prime Minister	François Fillon
France	Senator and President of Ain France-Holy group the Senate	Charles Revet
France	Member of Parliament and President of Ain France-Holy group the National Assembly	Xavier Breton
EU	President of the European Council	Herman Van Rompuy
EU	President of the European Commission	José Manuel Durão Barroso
Italy	President	Giorgio Napolitano
Italy	First Lady	Clio Maria Bittoni
Italy	Prime Minister	Matteo Renzi
Poland	President	Bronislaw Komorowski
Poland	First Lady	Anna Komorowska
Poland	Prime Minister	Donald Tusk
Poland	Former President	Aleksander Kwasniewski
Poland	Former First Lady	Jolanta Kwasniewska
Poland	Former President	Lech Wałęsa
Poland	Former First Lady	Danuta Wałęsa
Poland	Marshal of the Sejm	Ewa Kopacz
Poland	President of the Senate	Bogdan Borusewicz
Slovenia	President	Borut Pahor
Slovenia	Prime Minister	Alenka Bratušek

== Images ==
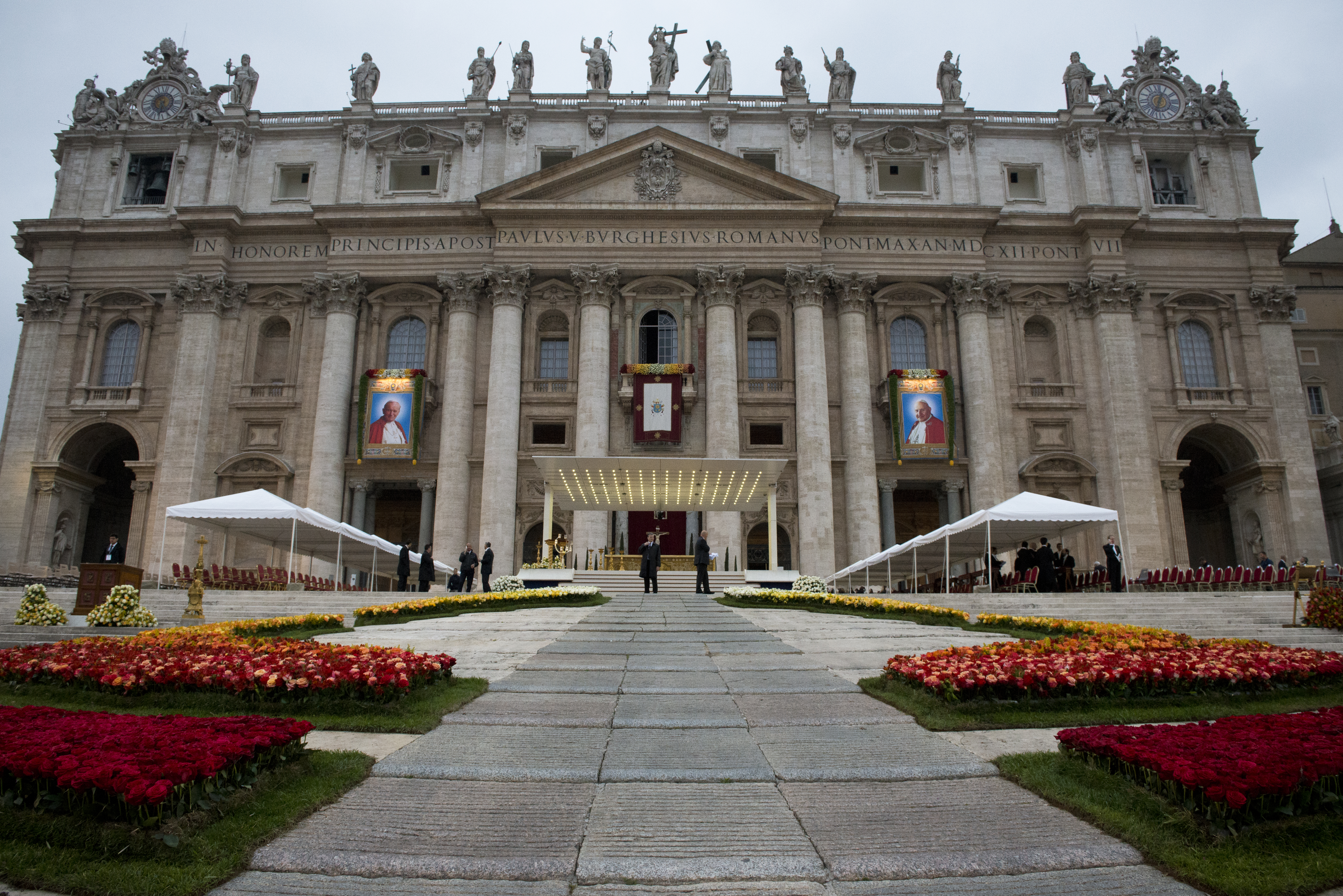

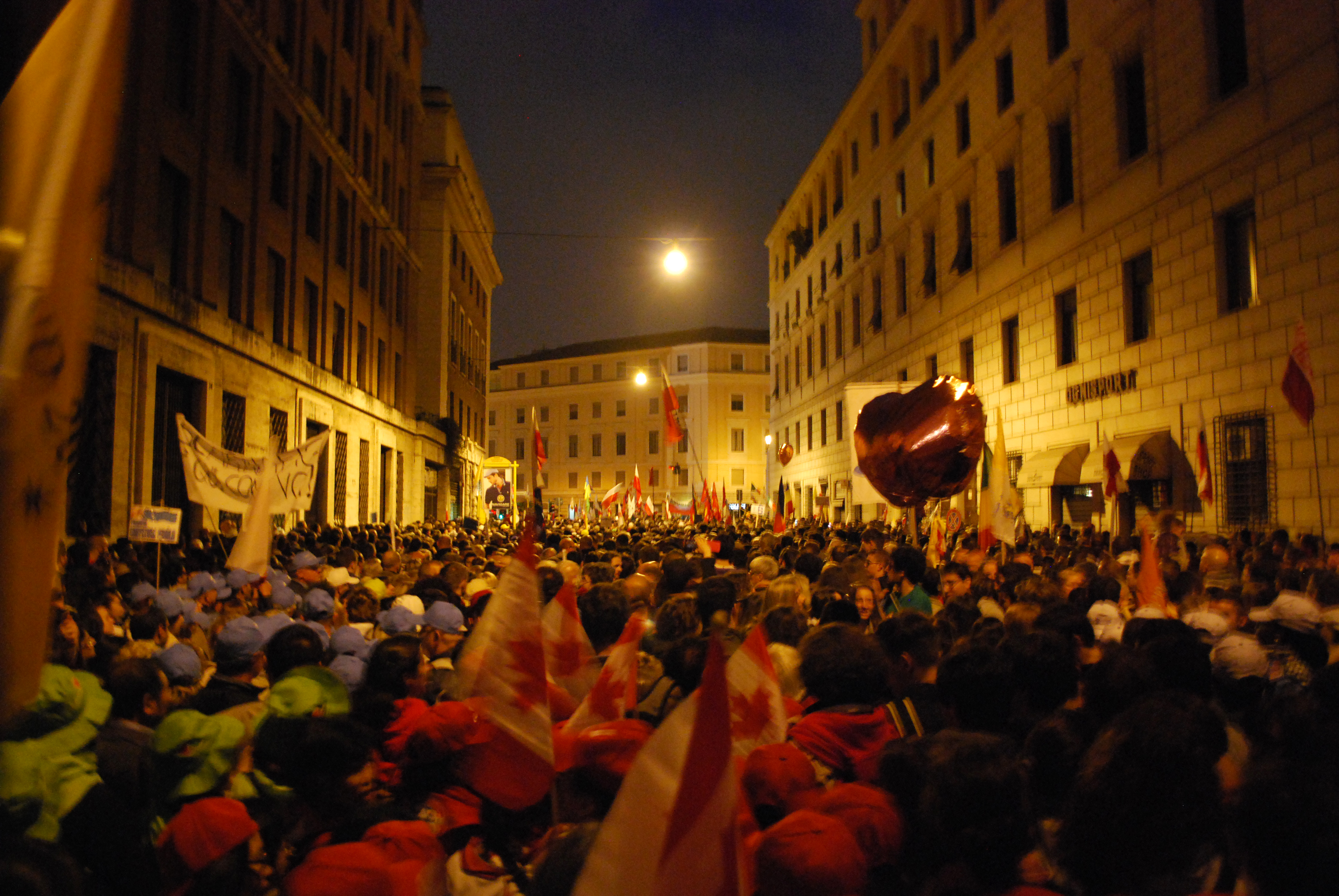

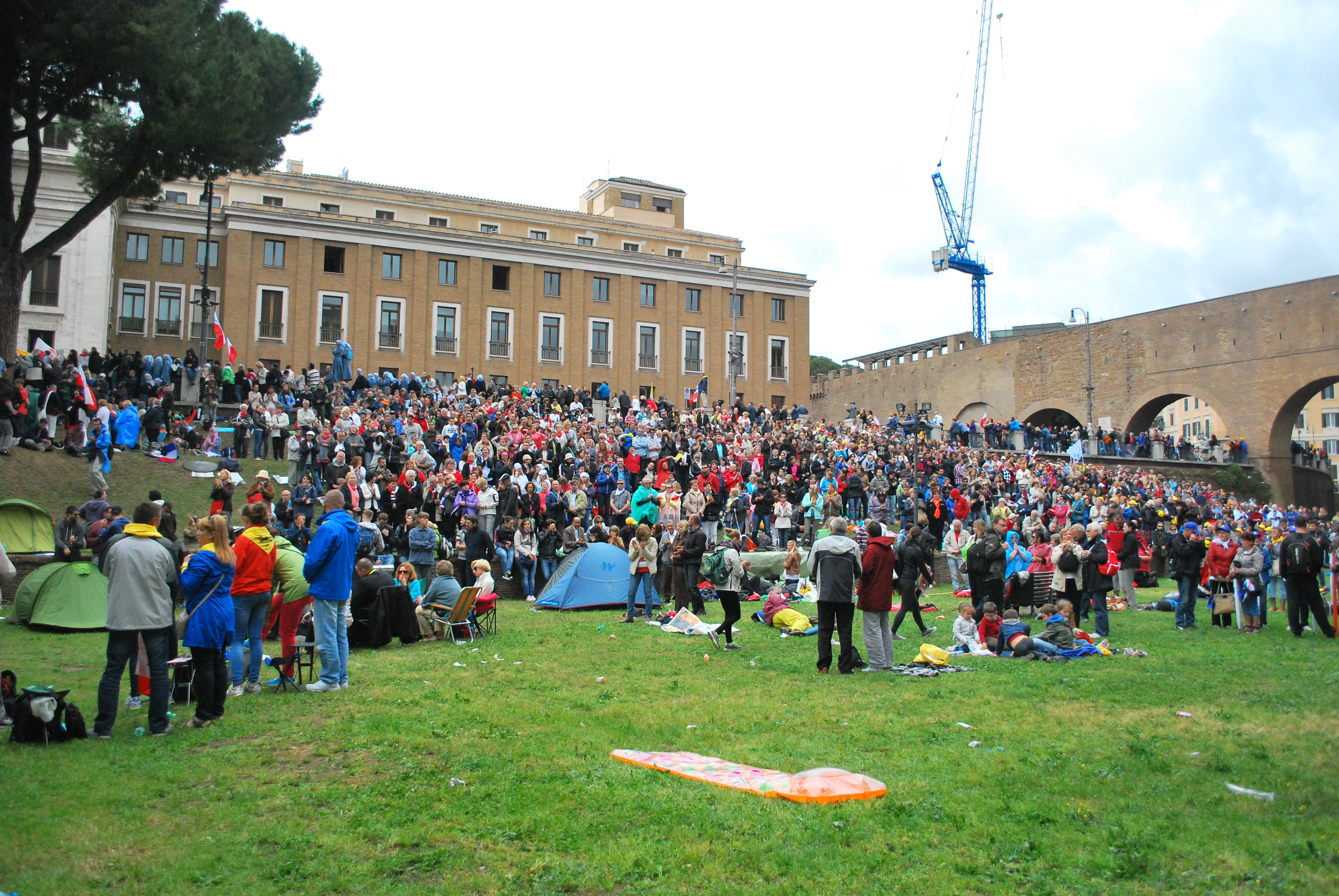

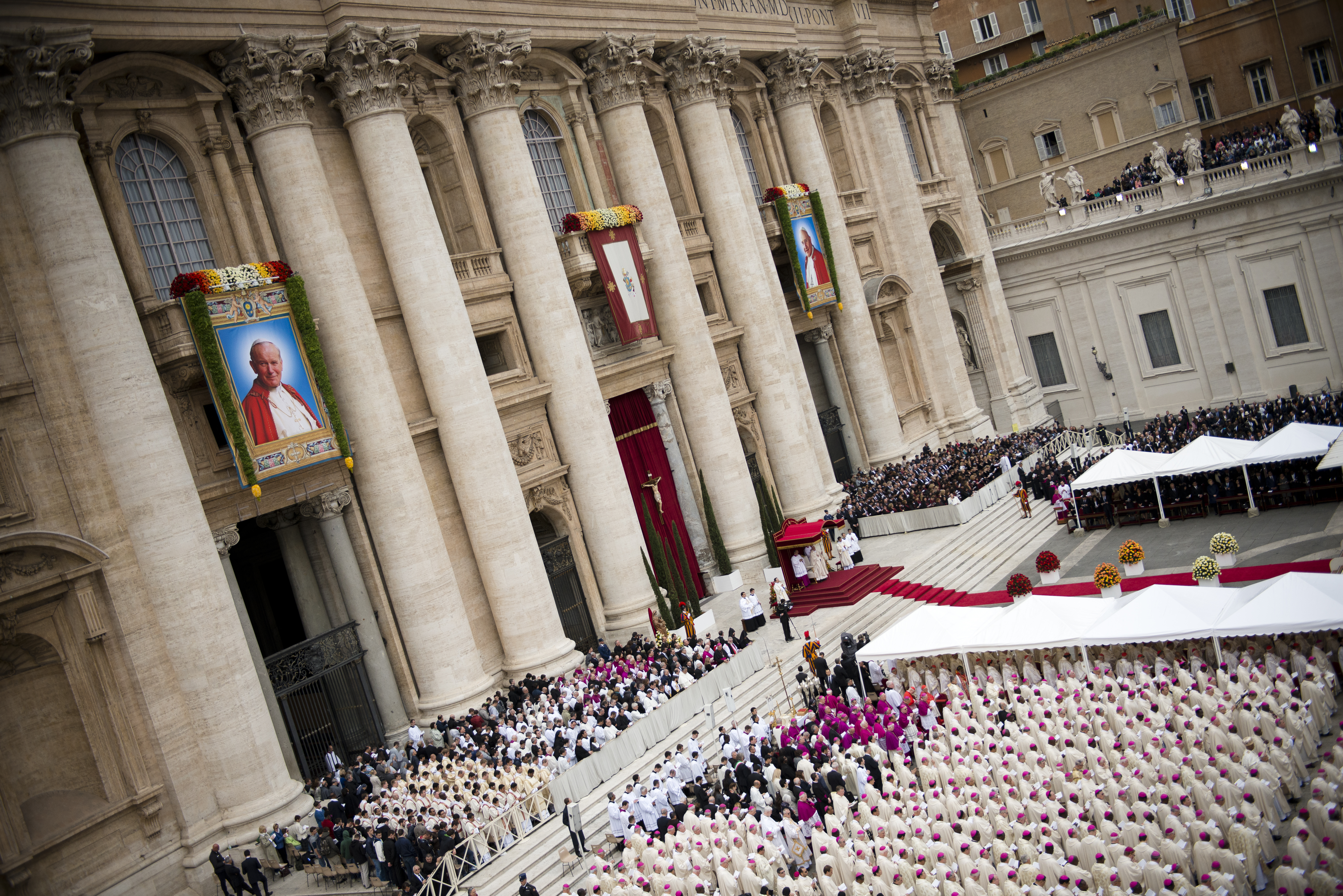

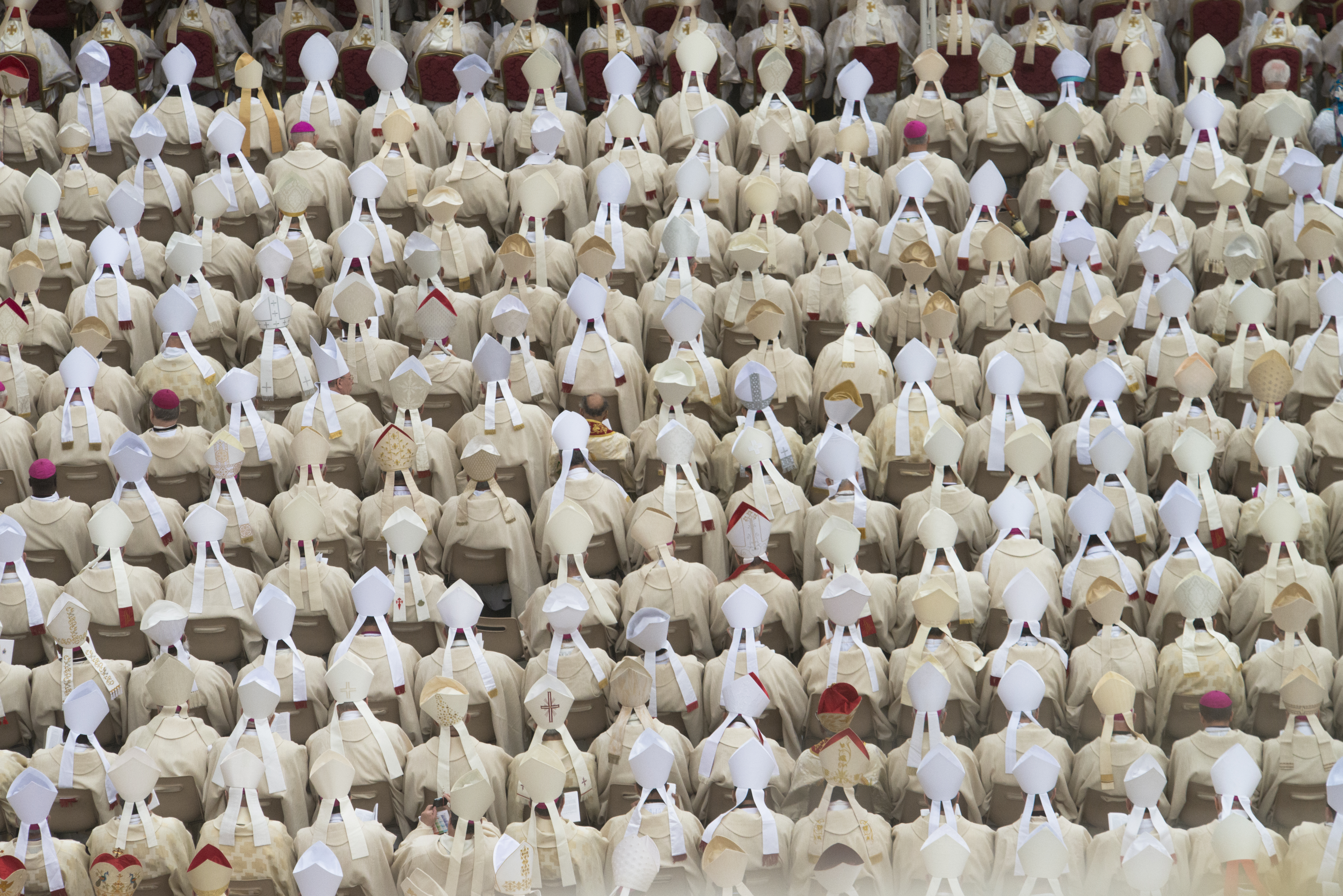

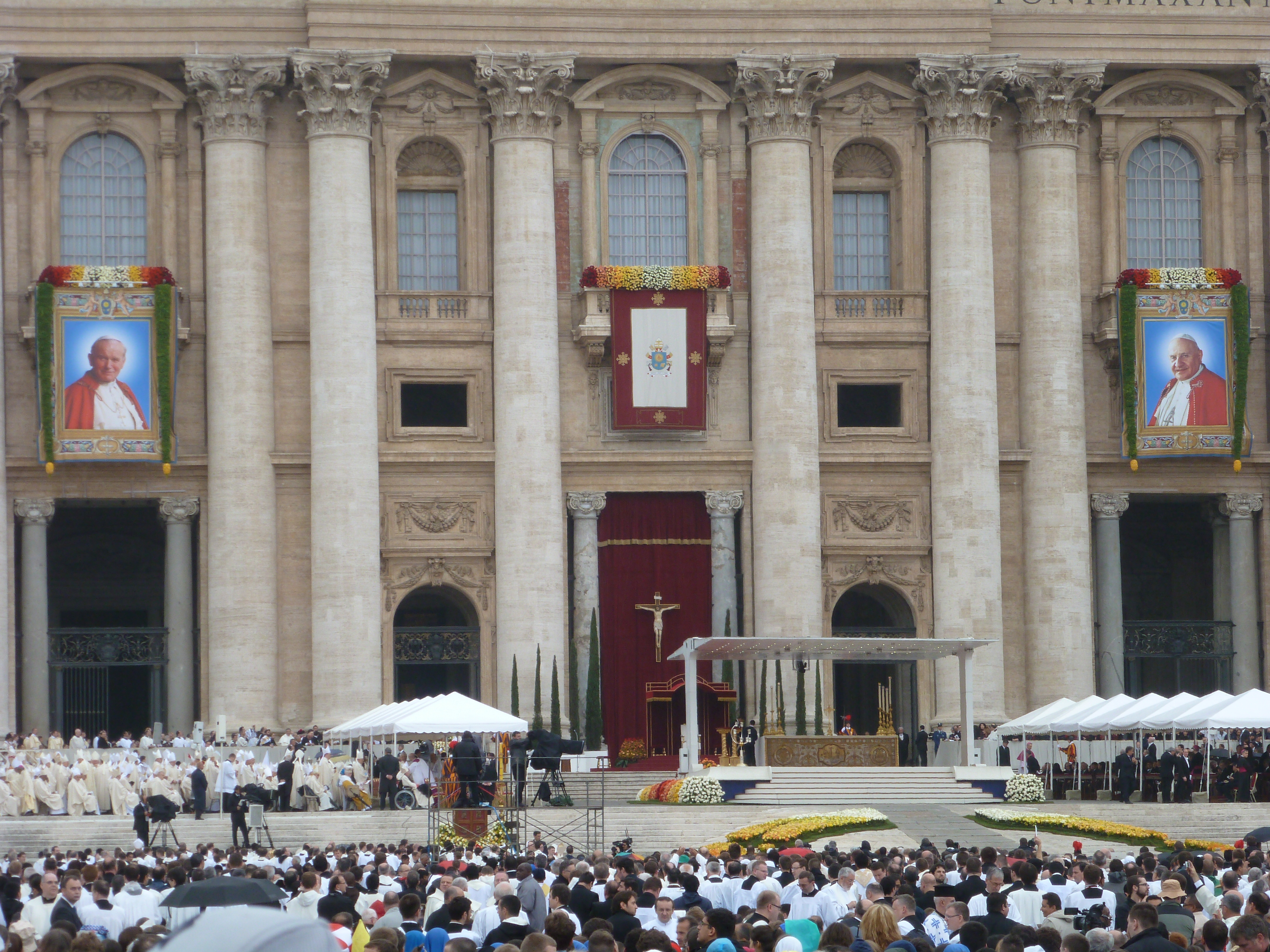

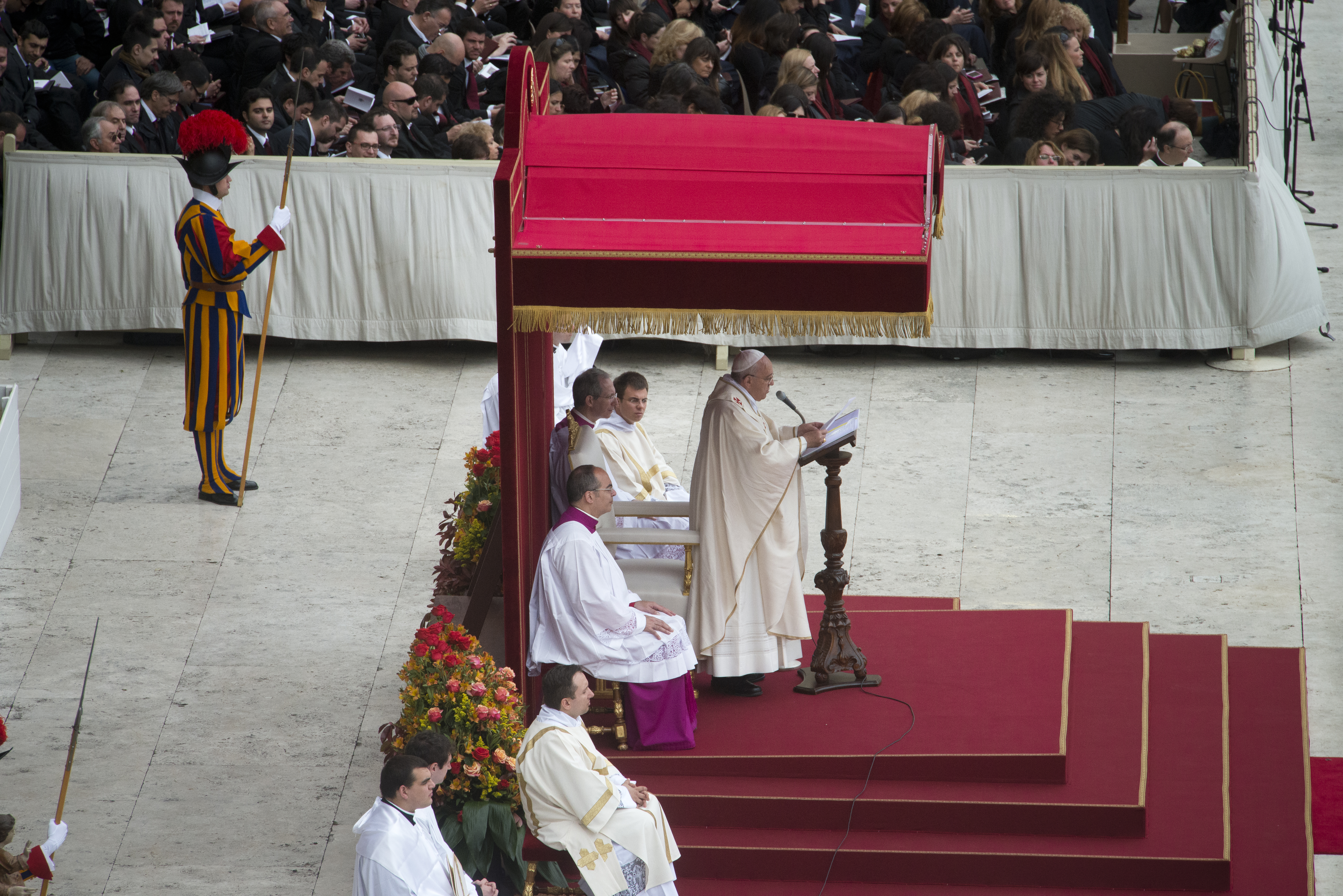

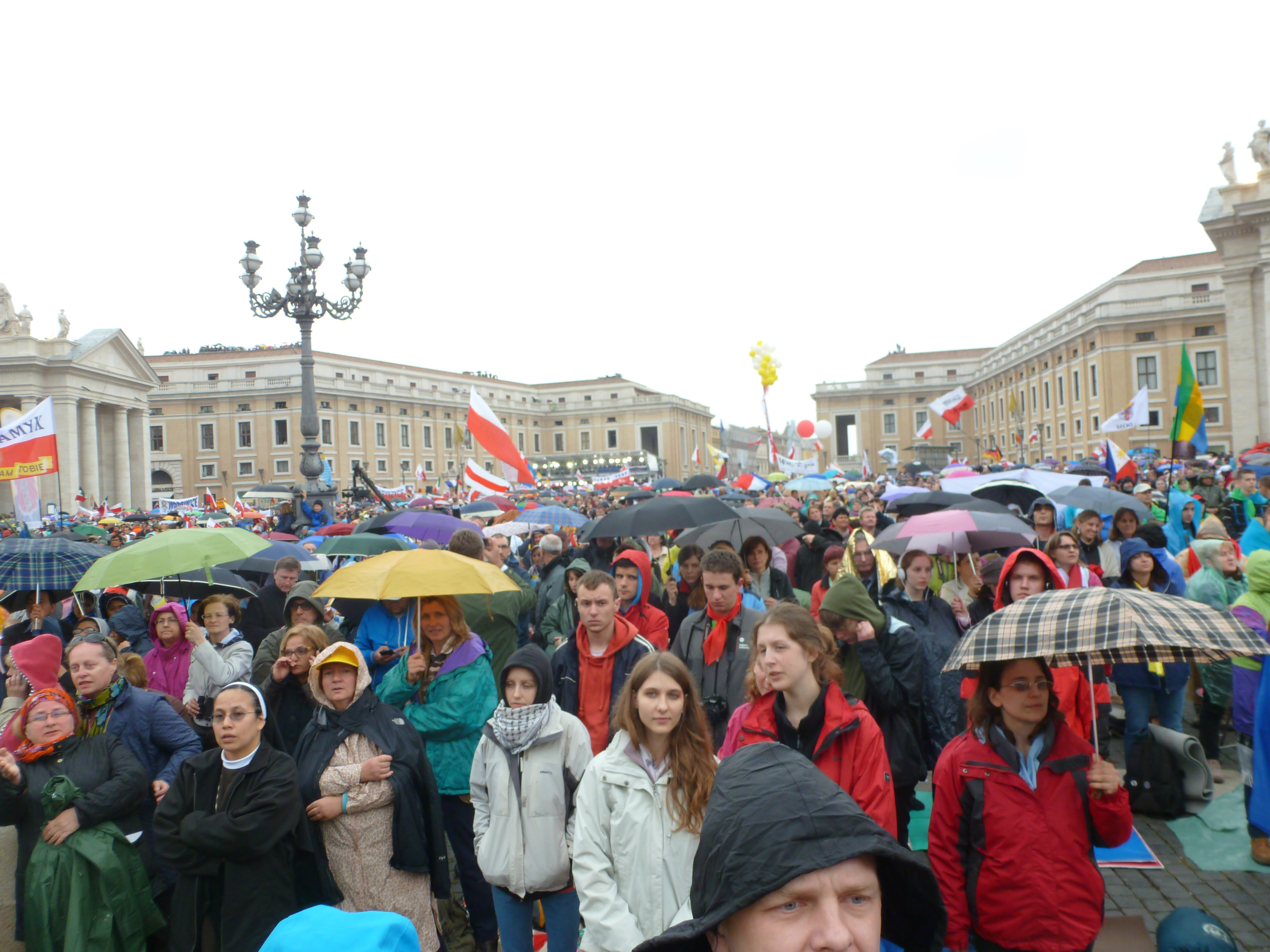

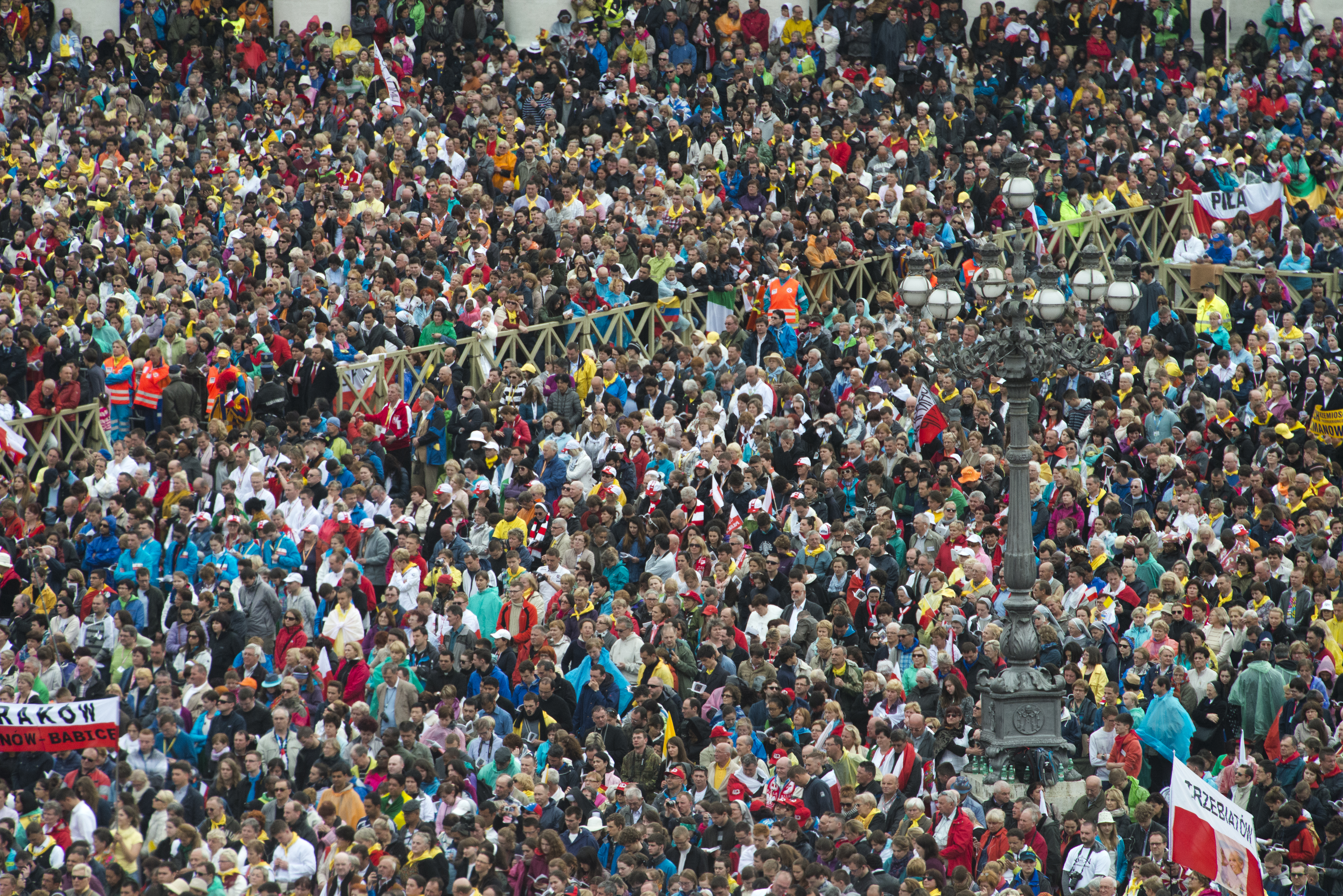
