= Waleska (disambiguation) =

Waleska is a city in Georgia, United States.

Waleska may also refer to:

Given name

- Waleska Amaya (born 1986), Honduran football player
- Waleska Diaz (born 1986), Honduran football player
- Waleska Soto (born 1990), Guatemalan sport shooter and softball player
- Waleska Crespo Rivera, Puerto Rican businesswoman and academic administrator

Surname

- Blanka Waleská (1910–1986), Czech actress
- Peggy Waleska (born 1980), German rower

== See also ==
- Wałęsa (disambiguation)
