= First Lady of Poland =

Wife of the president of Poland

- Pierwsza dama Polski
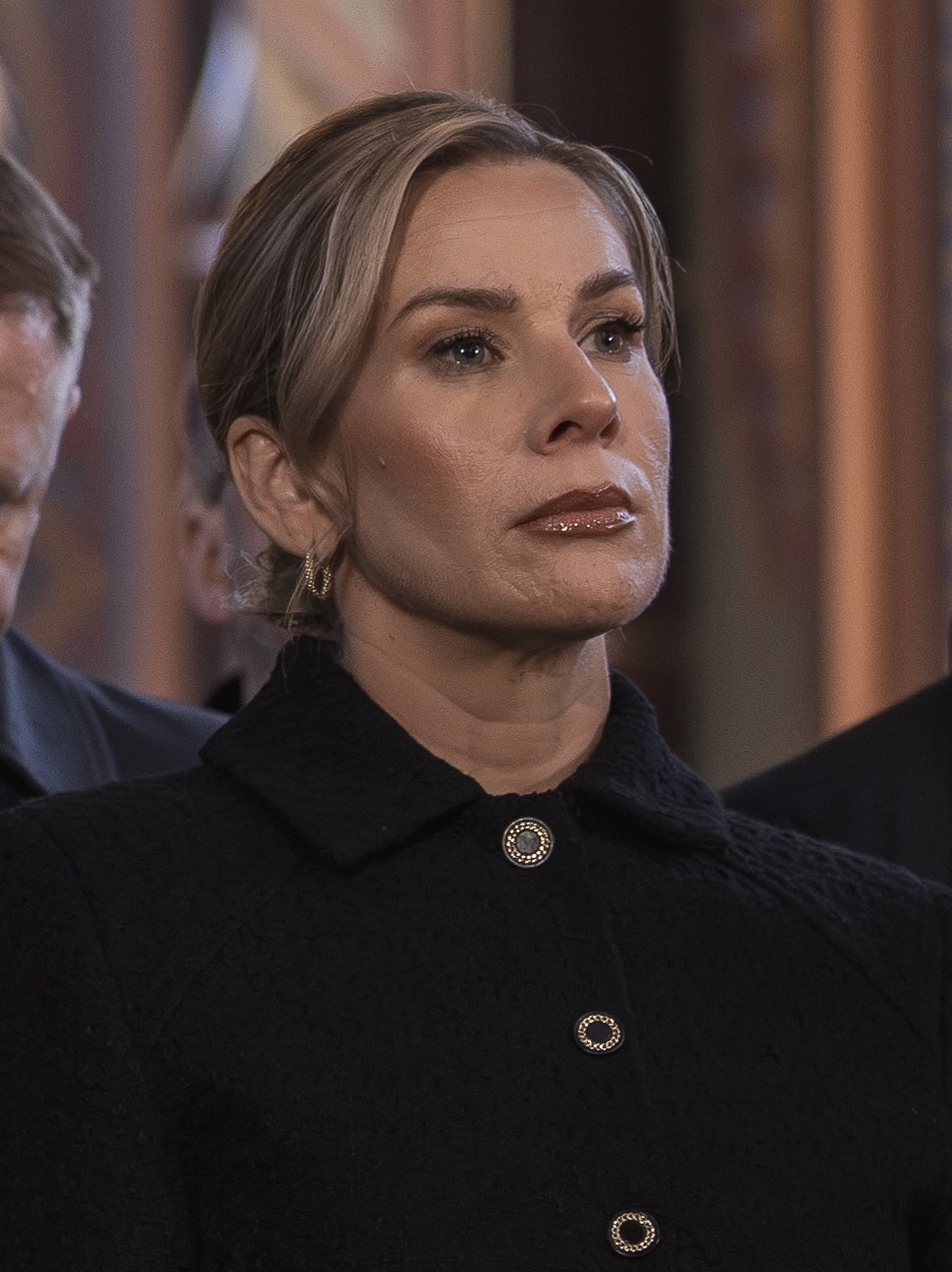
- Incumbent; Marta Nawrocka since 6 August 2025
- Residence: Presidential Palace
- Inaugural holder: Maria Piłsudska
- Formation: 14 November 1918
- Website: First Lady of Poland (Pierwsza Dama)

First Lady of the Republic of Poland is an informal designation customarily applied to the wife of the president of the Republic of Poland (as so far all Polish president in Third Republic had wives). The First Lady does not hold a constitutional position and there are no political duties associated with the role. However, the first lady sometimes accompanies her husband on formal occasions such as state visits.

The current Polish first lady is Marta Nawrocka.

== Second Republic (1918–1939) ==
| First Lady | Husband | From | To | Husband's title | Notes |
|---|---|---|---|---|---|
| Maria Piłsudska (1865–1921) | Józef Piłsudski (1867–1935) | 1918 | 1921 | Chief of State | Died |
| Aleksandra Piłsudska (1882–1963) | Józef Piłsudski (1867–1935) | 1921 | 1922 | Chief of State | |
| | Gabriel Narutowicz (1865–1922) | 1922 | 1922 | President | Narutowicz was a widower |
| Maria Wojciechowska (1869–1959) | Stanisław Wojciechowski (1869–1953) | 1922 | 1926 | President | |
| Michalina Mościcka (1871–1932) | Ignacy Mościcki (1867–1946) | 1926 | 1932 | President | |
| Maria Mościcka (1896–1979) | Ignacy Mościcki (1867–1946) | 1933 | 1939 | President | Maria Mościcka married Mościcki in 1933 |

== Government-in-Exile (1939–1990) ==
| First Lady | Husband | From | To | Husband's title | Notes |
|---|---|---|---|---|---|
| Jadwiga Raczkiewicz | Władysław Raczkiewicz (1885–1947) | 1939 | 1947 | President | |
| Ewelina Zaleska | August Zaleski (1883–1972) | 1947 | 1972 | President | |
| | Stanisław Ostrowski (1892–1982) | 1972 | 1979 | President | Ostrowski was a widower |
| | Edward Bernard Raczyński (1891–1993) | 1979 | 1986 | President | Raczyński was a widower |
| Anna Sabbat (1924–2015) | Kazimierz Sabbat (1913–1989) | 1986 | 1989 | President | |
| Karolina Kaczorowska (1930–2021) | Ryszard Kaczorowski (1919–2010) | 1989 | 1990 | President | |

== Communist Poland/Polish People's Republic (1944–1989) ==
| First Lady | Husband | From | To | Husband's title | Notes |
|---|---|---|---|---|---|
| Janina Górzyńska (1890–1985) | Bolesław Bierut (1892–1956) | 1944; 1948 | 1952; 1956 | President; General Secretary | |
| Rachela Silbiger (1907–1996) | Edward Ochab (1906–1989) | 1956 | 1956 | First Secretary | |
| Zofia Gomułka (1902–1986) | Władysław Gomułka (1905–1982) | 1956 | 1970 | First Secretary | |
| Stanisława Jędrusik (1918–2007) | Edward Gierek (1913–2001) | 1970 | 1980 | First Secretary | |
| Zofia Kania | Stanisław Kania (1927–2020) | 1980 | 1981 | First Secretary | |
| Barbara Ryfa (1931–2017) | Wojciech Jaruzelski (1923–2014) | 1981 | 1989 | First Secretary | |

== Third Republic (since 1989) ==
| First Lady | Husband | From | To | Husband's title | Notes |
|---|---|---|---|---|---|
| Barbara Ryfa (1931–2017) | Wojciech Jaruzelski (1923–2014) | 1989 | 1990 | President | |
| Danuta Wałęsa (b. 1949) | Lech Wałęsa (b. 1943) | 1990 | 1995 | President | |
| Jolanta Kwaśniewska (b. 1956) | Aleksander Kwaśniewski (b. 1954) | 1995 | 2005 | President | |
| Maria Kaczyńska (1942–2010) | Lech Kaczyński (1949–2010) | 2005 | 2010 | President | Both died in a plane crash |
| Anna Komorowska (b. 1953) | Bronisław Komorowski (b. 1952) | 2010 | 2015 | President | |
| Agata Kornhauser-Duda (b. 1972) | Andrzej Duda (b. 1972) | 2015 | 2025 | President | |
| Marta Nawrocka (b. 1986) | Karol Nawrocki (b. 1983) | 2025 | | President | |
