= Monika Jaruzelska =

Polish journalist, stylist and fashion designer

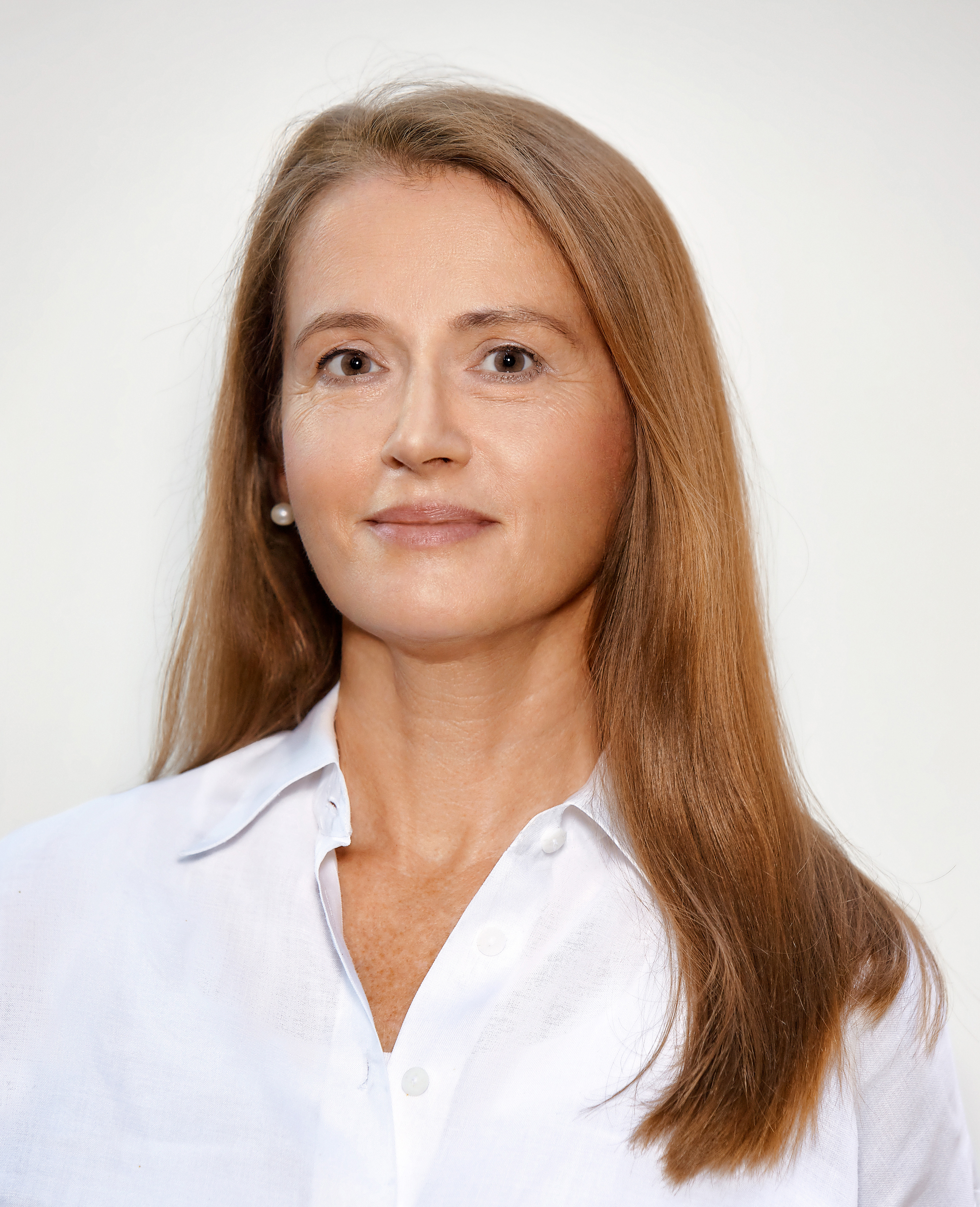
- Official portrait, 2018

Member of the Warsaw City Council
- In office 22 November 2018 – 7 May 2024

Personal details
- Born: Monika Anna Jaruzelska; 11 August 1963 (age 63) Warsaw, Poland
- Party: Broad fire extinguisher front (since 2025)
- Other political affiliations: Democratic Left Alliance (2018–2021); Polish Left (2019–2025)
- Children: 1
- Parent(s): Wojciech Jaruzelski; Barbara Ryfa
- Education: University of Warsaw
- Profession: Journalist; stylist; fashion designer

Monika Anna Jaruzelska (born 11 August 1963) is a Polish journalist. She is the daughter of former Polish President Wojciech Jaruzelski and his wife Barbara Jaruzelska.

== Biography ==
Jaruzelska was born in 1963 in Warsaw. She graduated in Polish studies from the University of Warsaw, and she also studied psychology. Jaruzelska founded the School of Style and was the author of Monika Jaruzelska invites (which broadcast for two years on Fridays on Radio Chilli Zet) and Without Masks.

In the early 1990s, she co-founded the monthly magazine Twój Styl (Your Style), and for 8 years directed fashion and styling department. Jaruzelska also served as creative director and board member of the group, which was composed of, among other things the company Kruk i Deni Cler and Deni Cler. She also published in the magazine Existence She also worked with the magazine Place for Dance.

Jaruzelska wrote her autobiography, Comrade Lady, published in April 2013, and its sequels, Family (April 2014) and Breath (May 2015).

Jaruzelska hosts a program on her YouTube channel called "Towarzyszka Panienka" (Comrade Lady) to which she regularly invites representatives of the far-right circles, and people promoting antisemitism, homophobia and conspiracy theories. As a consequence of that Jaruzelska's name appeared in the 2020 and 2021 issues of the Brown Book, a publication tracing acts of violence and hate speech by the "Never Again" Association.
