= Maria Kaczyńska =

First Lady of Poland (1942-2010)

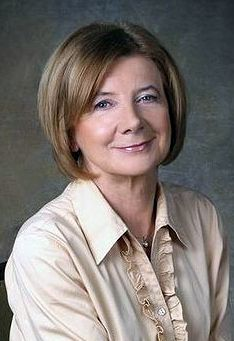

First Lady of Poland
- In role 23 December 2005 – 10 April 2010
- President: Lech Kaczyński
- Preceded by: Jolanta Kwaśniewska
- Succeeded by: Anna Komorowska

Personal details
- Born: Maria Helena Mackiewicz; 21 August 1942 Machava, Reichskommissariat Ostland (now Narach, Belarus)
- Died: 10 April 2010 (aged 67) Smolensk, Russia
- Party: Law and Justice
- Spouse: Lech Kaczyński (m. 1978)
- Children: 1
- Education: University of Gdańsk
- Profession: Economist

Maria Helena Kaczyńska (Polish pronunciation: [ˈmarja kaˈt͡ʂɨj̃ska]; née Mackiewicz [mat͡sˈkʲɛvit͡ʂ]; 21 August 1942^{[a]} – 10 April 2010) was the First Lady of Poland from 2005 to 2010 as the wife of President Lech Kaczyński. She and her husband died in a plane crash in the Russian city of Smolensk.

== Early and personal life ==
Kaczyńska was born in Machava (near Kabylnik, now Belarus), the daughter of Lidia and Czesław Mackiewicz. Her father fought in the Vilnius Armia Krajowa (Home Army), while an uncle fought in the Polish II Corps of Gen. Władysław Anders at the Battle of Monte Cassino during the Italian Campaign of World War II; another uncle was murdered by the NKVD (Soviet secret police) at Katyń.

Kaczyńska attended primary and secondary schools in Rabka Zdrój in southern Poland. She studied transport economics and foreign trade in Sopot at what is now the University of Gdańsk. After graduating in 1966, she worked at the Maritime Institute in Gdańsk, where she met Lech Kaczyński in 1976. They married in 1978, and had a daughter. In addition to her native Polish, Maria Kaczyńska spoke four languages such as English, French and some Spanish and Russian.

== Death ==
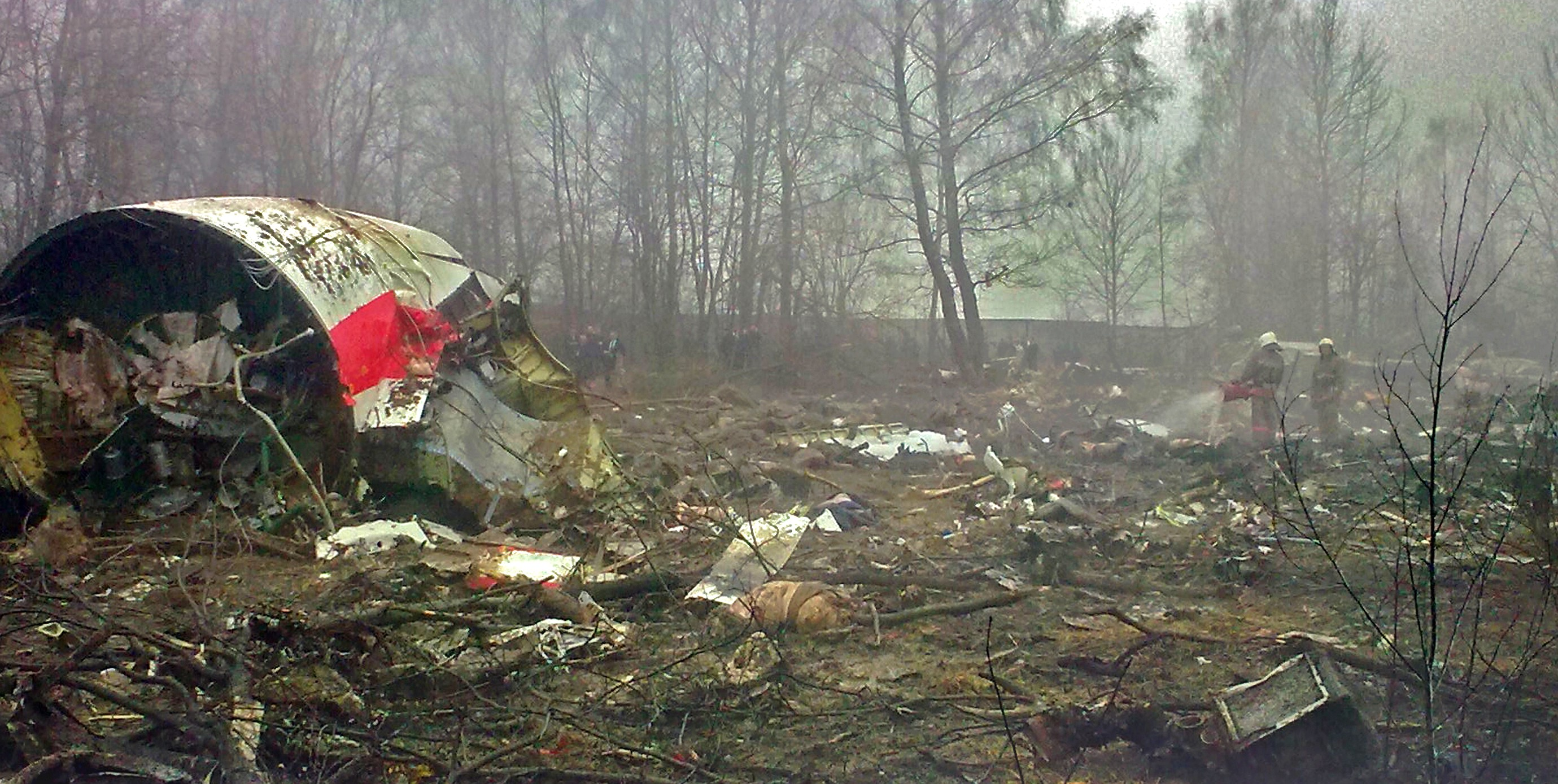
The wreckage at the scene of the crash in which Kaczyńska and her husband were killed

On 10 April 2010, 10:41 MSD (06:41 UTC), Maria Kaczyńska, and her husband, Polish President Lech Kaczyński, both died when the Polish Air Force Tupolev Tu-154M they were aboard crashed while attempting to land at Smolensk-North Airport in the Russian city of Smolensk. All 89 passengers on board and the seven crew members were killed. The Kaczyńskis were traveling with several senior government figures on a trip to mark the 70-year anniversary of the World War II Katyn Massacre, where thousands of Polish military officers were executed by the NKVD.

She was buried along with her husband on 18 April 2010 in the Wawel Cathedral. Her diary was found by her daughter after her death, sparking an interest among many publishers who desired to buy it and release it. However, Marta Kaczyńska-Dubieniecka said the diary was too precious for her to sell and also explained that she was not likely to reveal its content.

== Honours and awards ==
- Grand Cross of the Order of Polonia Restituta (16 April 2010, posthumously)
- Grand Cross of the Order of Vytautas the Great (15 April 2009, Lithuania)
- Xirka Ġieħ ir-Repubblika (26 January 2009, Malta)
- Grand Cross of the Order of Prince Henry (1 September 2008, Portugal)
- Dame Grand Cross of the Order pro merito Melitensi (14 May 2007)

== Notes ==
^{a} According to the list of passports of the Tu-154 flight. Some media gives her date of birth as 21 August 1943.

Honorary titles
Preceded by Jolanta Kwaśniewska	First Lady of Poland; 2005–2010	Succeeded by Anna Komorowska
