= Karolina Kaczorowska =

First Lady of Poland (1930–2021)

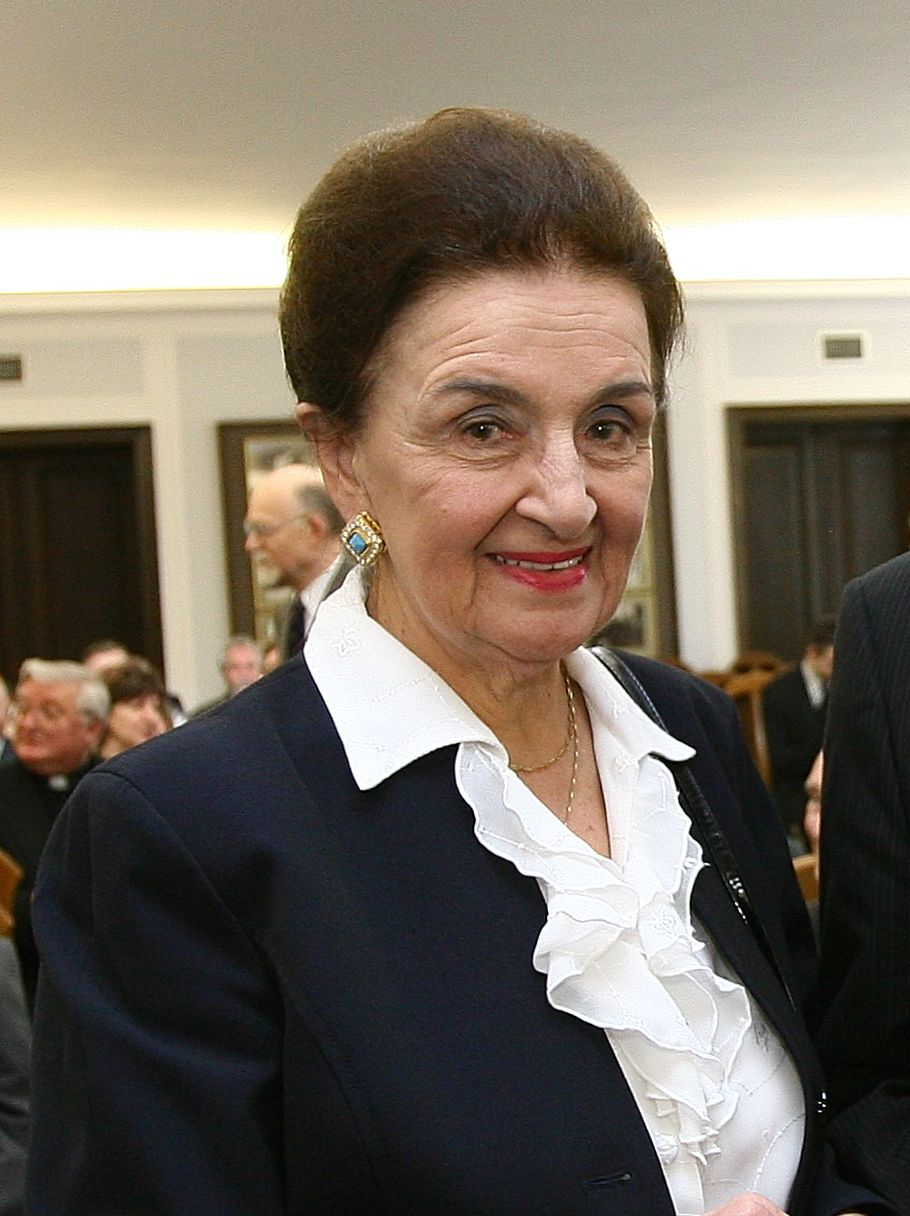
- in 2008

First Lady of Poland First Lady in Exile
- In role 19 July 1989 – 22 December 1990
- President: Ryszard Kaczorowski
- Preceded by: Anna Sabbat
- Succeeded by: Danuta Wałęsa

Personal details
- Born: Karolina Mariampolska; 26 October 1930 Stanisławów, Poland (now Ivano-Frankivsk, Ukraine)
- Died: 21 August 2021 (aged 90) London
- Spouse: Ryszard Kaczorowski (m. 1952; died 2010)
- Education: University of London
- Profession: Schoolteacher

Karolina Kaczorowska (born name: Karolina Mariampolska; 26 September 1930 – 21 August 2021) was the widow of Ryszard Kaczorowski, the last President of the Republic of Poland in exile, and thus the last emigree First Lady (1989–1990).

During the Soviet occupation (1939–1941) she was deported, along with her family, to Siberia. After being released, she attended Polish school in Uganda and graduated from the University of London. For a number of years, she worked as a schoolteacher and was active in the Polish exiled Scouting movement, where she met her future husband. They married on 19 July 1952. Karolina and Ryszard had 2 daughters, as well as 5 grandchildren.

Kaczorowska was originally due to attend the 70th anniversary of the Katyn massacre along with her husband, but health reasons prevented her from going. The entire Polish delegation, including former President Kaczorowski, were killed in the 2010 Polish Air Force Tu-154 crash.

She remained living in London, where she died 21 August 2021. She was buried in the Temple of Divine Providence, Warsaw. The funeral was conducted by Cardinal Kazimierz Nycz in the presence of President Andrzej Duda and his wife Agata.
