= Barbara Jaruzelska =

Polish academic (1931–2017)

First Lady of Poland
- In role 18 July 1989 – 22 December 1990
- President: Wojciech Jaruzelski
- Preceded by: Herself
- Succeeded by: Danuta Wałęsa

First Lady of the Polish People's Republic
- In role 6 November 1985 – 18 July 1989
- President: Wojciech Jaruzelski
- Preceded by: Jadwiga Wierzbicka
- Succeeded by: Herself

Personal details
- Born: 23 January 1931 Lublin, Poland
- Died: 29 May 2017 (aged 86)
- Spouse: Wojciech Jaruzelski (m. 1960; died 2014)
- Children: Monika Jaruzelska

Halina Barbara Jaruzelska (née Ryfa; 23 January 1931 – 29 May 2017) was a Polish academic, philologist, and professor of German studies and language. Jaruzelska was the First Lady of Poland from 1985 to 1990 during the government of her husband, General Wojciech Jaruzelski, the President of the Polish People's Republic (1985–1989) and the President of the Republic of Poland (1989–1990). Professionally, Jaruzelska worked as a lecturer and German philology professor at the Institute of Applied Linguistics at the University of Warsaw.

Jaruzelska died in on 29 May 2017, aged 86. Her funeral was held at Saint Charles Borromeo Church in Warsaw on 6 June 2017. She is interred in Powązki Cemetery.
