= Universidad Central del Caribe =

Private university in Bayamón, Puerto Rico

Coordinates: 18°21′58.3″N 66°09′12″W

- Type: Private
- Established: 1976; 50 years ago
- President: Waleska Crespo Rivera
- Location: Bayamón, Puerto Rico
- Colors: Orange and green
- Website: uccaribe.edu

The Universidad Central del Caribe (UCC) is a private university in Bayamón, Puerto Rico that focuses on graduate studies and professional certifications in the health sciences. It was founded in 1976 in the municipality of Cayey, but since 1990 all its facilities have been integrated into one campus at the grounds of the Dr. Ramón Ruiz Arnau University Hospital in Bayamón.
