= Wałęsa (disambiguation) =

Lech Wałęsa (born 1943) is a Polish statesman, dissident, and Nobel Peace Prize laureate, who served as the President of Poland between 1990 and 1995.

Wałęsa or Walesa may also refer to:

- Danuta Wałęsa (born 1949), wife of Lech Wałęsa
- Jarosław Wałęsa (born 1976), Polish MP and son of Lech Wałęsa
- Gdańsk Lech Wałęsa Airport
- Walesa: Man of Hope, a 2013 film about Lech Wałęsa, directed by Andrzej Wajda
