= Agata Kornhauser-Duda =

First Lady of Poland (born 1972)

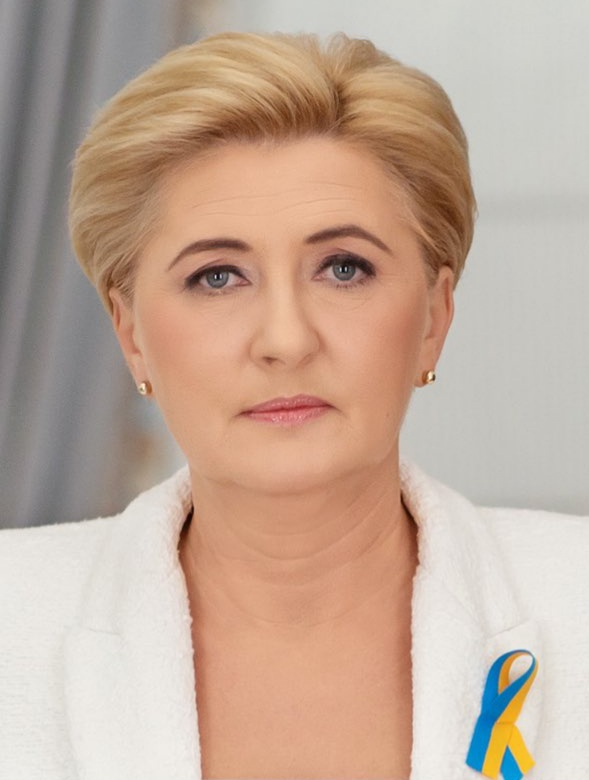
- Kornhauser-Duda in 2022

First Lady of Poland
- In role 6 August 2015 – 6 August 2025
- President: Andrzej Duda
- Preceded by: Anna Komorowska
- Succeeded by: Marta Nawrocka

Personal details
- Born: Agata Kornhauser; 2 April 1972 (age 54) Kraków, Poland
- Spouse: Andrzej Duda (m. 1994)
- Children: 1
- Parents: Julian Kornhauser; Alicja Wojna
- Education: Jagiellonian University
- Awards: Order of Leopold (Belgium) Royal Norwegian Order of Merit

Agata Kornhauser-Duda (born 2 April 1972) is a Polish teacher who served as the First Lady of Poland from 2015 to 2025 as the wife of the president of Poland, Andrzej Duda.

== Background and family ==
Kornhauser was born in Kraków, the child of Julian Kornhauser, a Polish writer, translator and literary critic of Jewish descent, and Alicja Wojna, a Polish philologist. She has one brother, Jakub, a poet and translator.

She has been married to Andrzej Duda since 21 December 1994. Together they have one daughter.

== Professional career ==
She is a teacher at the Jan III Sobieski High School, Kraków, where she has worked since 1998. She has been described as a demanding but fair and dedicated teacher, and during the presidential campaign only took one day off, vowing to stay with her students until the end of the school year. The school is her husband's alma mater, she herself attended its rival Bartłomiej Nowodworski High School. She wrote her dissertation on the tetralogy of Horst Bienek at the Jagiellonian University, where she and her husband met.

== First Lady of Poland ==
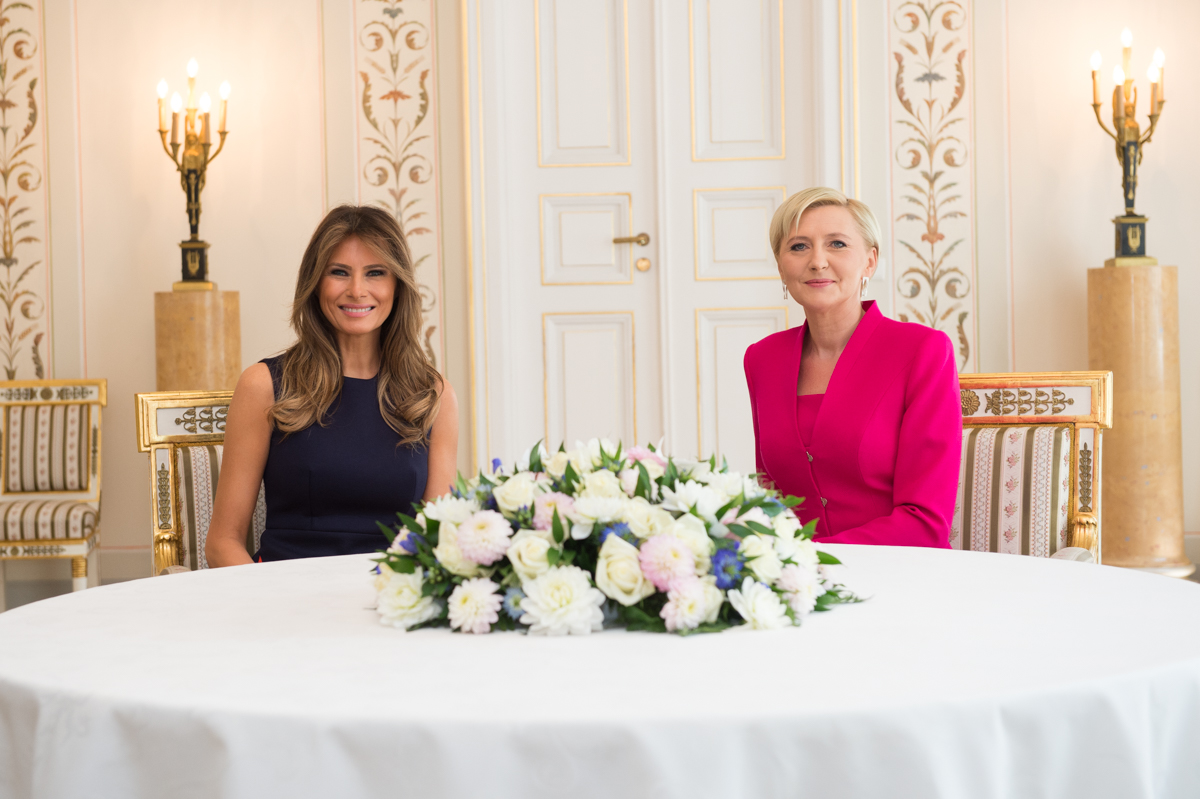
First Lady Kornhauser-Duda in a meeting with the First Lady of the United States Melania Trump, July 2017

She became the first lady of Poland on 6 August 2015, when her husband became president. On 24 May 2015, he won the second round of the presidential election, achieving 51.55% of the vote against the 48.45% won by his rival, the incumbent Bronisław Komorowski. During the campaign she supported her husband by appearing in party broadcasts. In terms of her own political beliefs, she has been described as more liberal than Andrzej Duda by her brother.

== Honours ==
=== Foreign honours ===
- Belgium: Grand Cordon of the Order of Leopold (13 October 2015)
- Norway: Dame Grand Cross of the Royal Norwegian Order of Merit (23 May 2016)
- Estonia: Member 1st Class of the Order of the Cross of Terra Mariana (8 April 2025)
- Finland: Grand Cross of the Order of the White Rose of Finland (24 October 2017)
- Italy: Grand Cross of the Order of Merit of the Italian Republic (17 April 2023)
- South Korea: Grand Gwanghwa Medal of the Order of Diplomatic Service Merit (13 July 2023)

Honorary titles
| Preceded by Anna Komorowska | First Lady of Poland; 2015–2025 | Succeeded by Marta Nawrocka |
