= Marta Nawrocka =

First Lady of Poland since 2025

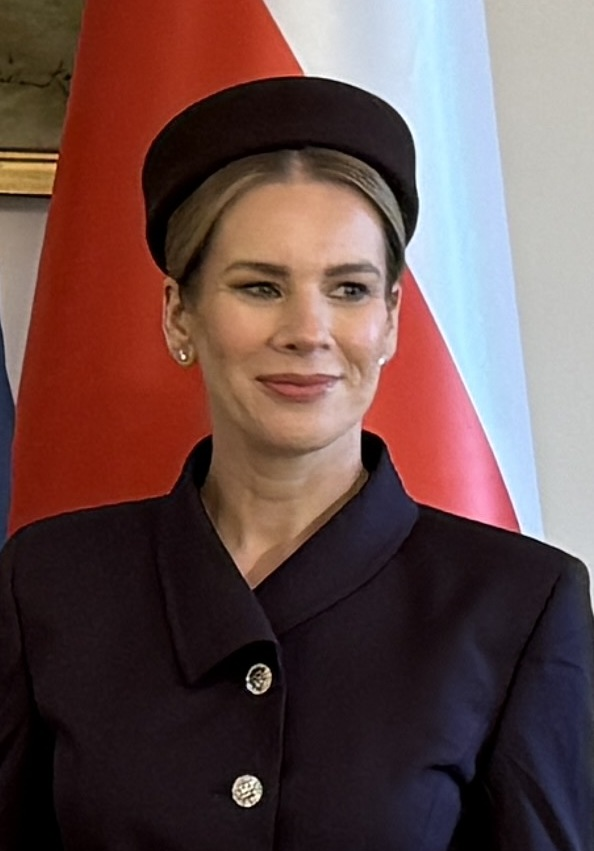
- Nawrocka in 2026

First Lady of Poland
- Current
- Assumed role 6 August 2025
- President: Karol Nawrocki
- Preceded by: Agata Kornhauser-Duda

Personal details
- Born: Marta Smoleń; 7 March 1986 (age 40) Gdynia, Poland
- Spouse: Karol Nawrocki (m. 2010)
- Children: 3
- Education: University of Gdańsk
- Occupation: Civil servant

Marta Nawrocka (née Smoleń; born 7 March 1986) is a Polish civil servant and administrative official. Since August 2025, Nawrocka has been serving as the First Lady of Poland, as the wife of President Karol Nawrocki.

== Early life ==
Nawrocka was born on 7 March 1986 in Gdynia, Poland. She practiced ballet in her youth, attending the Janina Jarzynówna-Sobczak Ballet School in Gdańsk. She graduated from the Faculty of Law and Administration at University of Gdańsk.

== Career ==
Nawrocka works as an officer in the National Revenue Administration. Her entire professional career has been dedicated to this institution, which was previously known as the Customs Service before its transformation into the National Revenue Administration.

== Personal life ==
Nawrocka met her husband in 2005, whom she married on 22 May 2010.

She has three children: Daniel (from a previous relationship, adopted by Karol Nawrocki and bearing his surname), Antoni, and Katarzyna (from her marriage with Karol Nawrocki).

Honorary titles
Preceded by Agata Kornhauser-Duda	First Lady of Poland; 2025–present	Current holder
