= Wojciech Jaruzelski =

Leader of Poland from 1981 to 1989

General Wojciech Jaruzelski
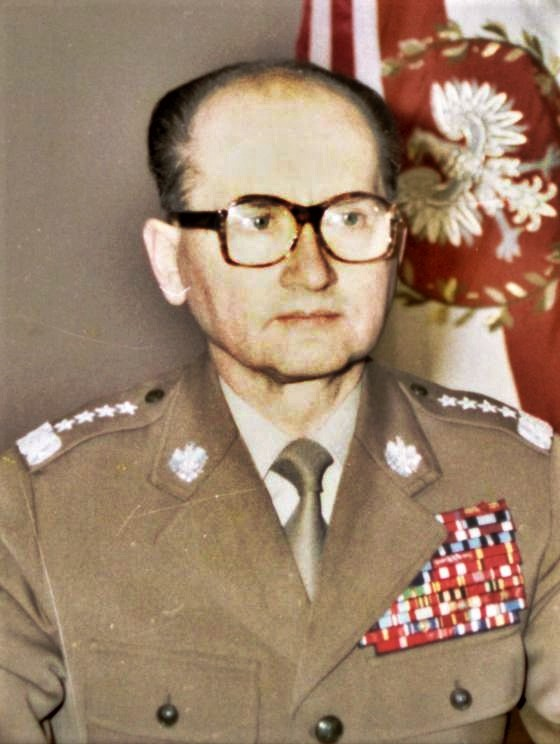
- Jaruzelski in 1981

President of Poland (Note: As President of the Polish People's Republic until 31 December 1989, thereafter as President of the Republic of Poland.)
- In office 19 July 1989 – 22 December 1990
- Prime Minister: Mieczysław Rakowski; Czesław Kiszczak; Tadeusz Mazowiecki
- Preceded by: Office restored
- Succeeded by: Lech Wałęsa

First Secretary of the Polish United Workers' Party
- In office 18 October 1981 – 29 July 1989
- Prime Minister: Himself; Zbigniew Messner; Mieczysław Rakowski
- Preceded by: Stanisław Kania
- Succeeded by: Mieczysław Rakowski

6th Chairman of the Council of State
- In office 6 November 1985 – 19 July 1989
- Prime Minister: Zbigniew Messner; Mieczysław Rakowski
- Deputy: Tadeusz Witold Młyńczak; Tadeusz Szelachowski; Zenon Komender; Kazimierz Barcikowski
- First Secretary: Himself; Mieczysław Rakowski
- Preceded by: Henryk Jabłoński
- Succeeded by: Office abolished; Himself as President

Prime Minister of Poland
- In office 11 February 1981 – 6 November 1985
- First Secretary: Stanisław Kania; Himself
- Preceded by: Józef Pińkowski
- Succeeded by: Zbigniew Messner

Minister of National Defence
- In office 11 April 1968 – 22 November 1983
- Prime Minister: Józef Cyrankiewicz; Piotr Jaroszewicz; Edward Babiuch; Józef Pińkowski; Himself
- Preceded by: Marian Spychalski
- Succeeded by: Florian Siwicki

Personal details
- Born: Wojciech Witold Jaruzelski; 6 July 1923 Kurów, Poland
- Died: 25 May 2014 (aged 90) Warsaw, Poland
- Resting place: Powązki Military Cemetery, Warsaw
- Party: PPR (1944–1948); PZPR (1948–1990); Independent (from 1990)
- Spouse: Barbara Jaruzelska (m. 1961)
- Children: Monika Jaruzelska
- Education: Świerczewski General Staff Academy

Military service
- Allegiance: Polish People's Republic; Republic of Poland
- Branch/service: Polish People's Army; Polish Armed Forces
- Years of service: 1943–1991
- Rank: General
- Battles/wars: World War II; Battle of Berlin
- De facto leader of the PPR: ← Kania; (Last in role) →

Wojciech Witold Jaruzelski (Note: /ˈvɔɪtʃɛx ˌjɑːruːˈzɛlski/ VOY-chekh YAR-oo-ZEL-skee, Polish pronunciation: [ˈvɔjt͡ɕɛɣ ˈvitɔlt jaruˈzɛlskʲi]) (6 July 1923 – 25 May 2014) was a Polish military general, politician and de facto leader of the Polish People's Republic from 1981 until 1989, serving as a military dictator from 13 December 1981 until 22 July 1983. He was the First Secretary of the Polish United Workers' Party between 1981 and 1989, making him the last leader of the Polish People's Republic. Jaruzelski served as Prime Minister from 1981 to 1985, the Chairman of the Council of State from 1985 to 1989 and briefly as President of Poland from 1989 to 1990 (Note: However, while he stayed an official head of state until December 1990, he effectively lost the de facto control over the country in August 1989), when the office of President was restored after 37 years. He was also the last commander-in-chief of the Polish People's Army, which in 1990 became the Polish Armed Forces.

Born to Polish nobility in Kurów in eastern (then-central) Poland, Jaruzelski was deported with his family to Siberia by the NKVD after the invasion of Poland. Assigned to forced labour in the Siberian wilderness, he developed photokeratitis, which forced him to wear protective sunglasses for the rest of his life. In 1943, Jaruzelski joined the newly created First Polish Army and fought alongside the Soviets against Nazi Germany in the Eastern Front, most notably in the liberation of Warsaw and in the Battle of Berlin. Following the Polish October and the expatriation of Marshal Konstantin Rokossovsky back to the Soviet Union, Jaruzelski became the chief political officer of the Polish People's Army and eventually Polish Minister of Defence in 1968.

Jaruzelski became the First Secretary of the Polish United Workers' Party and leader of Poland after the brief one-year term of Stanisław Kania. Kania's predecessor, Edward Gierek, left Poland indebted by accepting loans from foreign creditors and the country's economy, rocked by strikes, was unstable by the time Jaruzelski became head of state. As Poland headed towards insolvency, rationing was enforced due to shortages of basic goods, which only contributed to the tense social and political situation. The declining living and working conditions triggered anger among the masses and strengthened anti-Communist sentiment; the Solidarity union was also gaining support, which worried the Polish Central Committee and the Soviet Union, which viewed Solidarity as a threat to the Warsaw Pact. After his request for a joint Soviet-Polish operation was denied by the Soviets, who were already deeply embroiled in the Soviet-Afghan war, Jaruzelski imposed martial law in Poland on 13 December 1981 to crush the anti-communist opposition. The military junta, curfew and travel restrictions lasted until 22 July 1983.

With the Brezhnev doctrine now effectively rendered forceless due to deepening Soviet entanglement in Afghanistan and their own economic crisis, the Polish United Workers' Party (PZPR)'s two unsuccessful reform attempts in 1982 and 1987, resulting in the complete collapse of the party's legitimacy and support, as highlighted by the 1988 Polish strikes and a resurgent Solidarity, Jaruzelski began negotiations with the still-banned movement's leaders in late 1988. Acquiescing to their demands, the Polish Round Table Talks were held in early 1989, transforming the system to a multi-party one, with the first semi-free election in the Communist bloc scheduled for 4 June 1989. Solidarity scored an unexpectedly overwhelming victory in the election, starting the chain reaction that resulted in the Fall of Communism in Central and Eastern Europe. Prices were fully freed on 1 August 1989, with Poland becoming only the second Communist country to do so after China in 1985. Facing hyperinflation and increasing strike pressure, Jaruzelski's Prime Minister-designate Czesław Kiszczak failed to clear the vote as PZPR's satellite parties shifted their support to Solidarity's candidate Tadeusz Mazowiecki, who formed the first non-communist government in the Eastern Bloc. Left with only a ceremonial post from July 1989 as President of the Polish People's Republic, he exercised no real power; the PZPR dissolved itself in January 1990 and Jaruzelski retired, with the Solidarity leader Lech Wałęsa succeeding him in the 1990 Polish presidential election as the first President elected in a popular vote.

Having served as the country's leader during its turbulent final years of Communist rule, Jaruzelski remains a controversial figure in Poland to this day. He was praised for allowing the country's peaceful transition into democracy, but was also fiercely criticised by contemporaries for his imposition of martial law, including his government's violent suppression of protests and imprisonment of thousands of opposition activists without definite charges, among other human rights violations.

== Early life ==
Wojciech Witold Jaruzelski was born on 6 July 1923, at 9 PM in Kurów, into a family of Polish gentry. The name which he had received was a tribute to his grandfather, who fought in the January Uprising. He was the 7th out of the total of 8 children, which Wanda (née Zaremba) and Władysław Mieczysław Jaruzelski, a Czech-educated agronomist and volunteered soldier who fought in the war against Soviet Russia in 1920 had and was raised on the family estate near Wysokie (in the vicinity of Białystok). From 1933 until September 1939, he was educated in a Catholic school in Warsaw where he received strict religious education. During the period of time from 1937 to 1939, he was a member of the Polish Scouting and Guiding Association.

World War II commenced on 1 September 1939 with the invasion of Poland by Germany, aided by the Soviet invasion of Poland sixteen days later. These resulted in the complete defeat of Poland by October and a partition between Soviet and German zones of control. Jaruzelski and his family, at the time of the aggression, were residing in one of the properties they owned, which was located in Lida Powiat (now Lida, Belarus). As a result of the attack, during the night from 22 to 23 September, they decided to flee to Lithuania to stay with some friends. However, a few months later, after Lithuania and the other Baltic states were forcibly incorporated into the Soviet Union. Jaruzelski and his family were captured by the Red Army and designated for deportation to Siberia.

In June 1941, they were stripped of their valuable possessions and deported. At the railway station, Jaruzelski was separated from his father, who was sent directly to a gulag. Jaruzelski and his mother were sent on a month-long journey to Biysk, Altai Krai. After that, Jaruzelski walked for 180 kilometres (110 mi) to Turochak where he was responsible for forest cleaning. During his labour work, he was stricken with snow blindness, suffering permanent damage to his eyes as well as to his back. His eye condition forced him to wear dark sunglasses most of the time for the rest of his life, which became his trademark. In January 1942, he made a decision to leave Turochak and make his way towards Biysk with the objective of reuniting with his father, who died on 4 June 1942 from dysentery; his mother and sister survived the war (she died in 1966).

== Military service and early political career ==
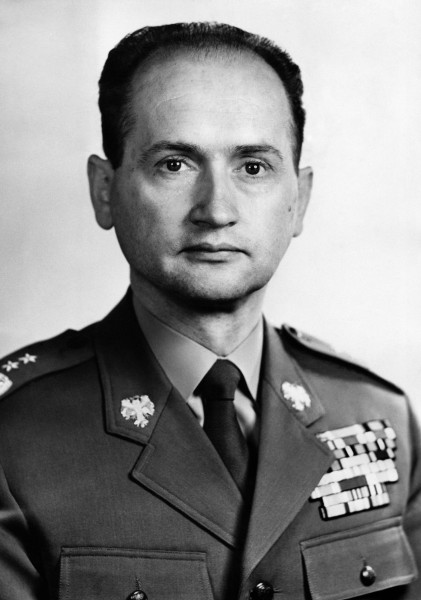
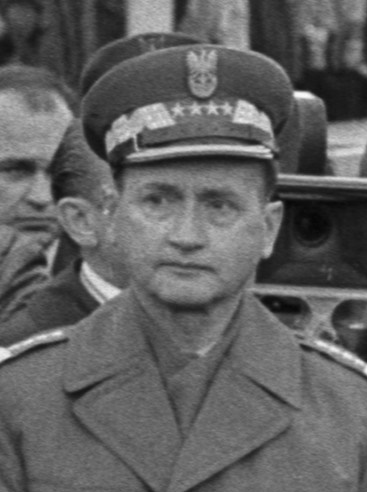
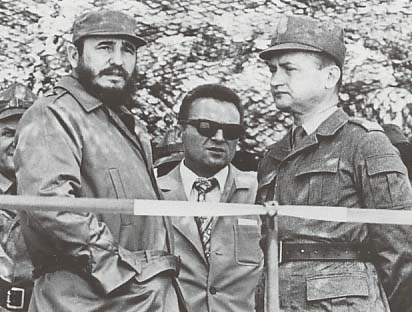
Top-left: Jaruzelski in 1968
Top-right:Jaruzelski in 1974
Bottom: Jaruzelski (with Fidel Castro) in 1972

=== Active service ===
Jaruzelski was selected by the Soviet authorities for enrollment into the Soviet Officer Training School. During his time in the Kazakh Soviet Socialist Republic, Jaruzelski wanted to join the non-Soviet controlled Polish exile army led by Władysław Anders, but in 1943, by which time the Soviet Union was fighting in Europe against Germany in the Eastern Front, he joined the Polish army units being formed under Soviet command. He served in this Soviet-controlled First Polish Army during the war. He participated in the 1945 Soviet military takeover of Warsaw and the Battle of Berlin. By the time the war ended that year, he had gained the rank of lieutenant. On 1 July 1945 he crossed the Lusatian Neisse back into Poland.

On 5 July 1945, as a result of the Polish-Czechoslovak border conflicts, the regiment in which he served received an order to defend a 107 kilometres long part of the border from Racibórz to Racławice Śląskie. The regiment was stationed in Głubczyce and on 3 August of the same year, he was selected as a military commandant of the city.

In the initial post-war years, he engaged in counterinsurgent warfare against formerly Nazi-allied Ukrainian Insurgent Army (UPA) and anti-communist "cursed soldiers". In 1946, he took part in the reinforcement of the government forces during the famous Attack on Hrubieszów by the UPA and cursed soldiers. Anti-communist historian Sławomir Cenckiewicz identifies that around 70% of Jaruzelski's military engagements in this period were against the UPA, whereas 30% were against the National Armed Forces. After the end of the war, Jaruzelski graduated from the Polish Higher Infantry School and then from the General Staff Academy.

Jaruzelski retired from the army on 31 January 1991, at the age of 67.

=== Early political career ===
He joined Poland's Communist party, the Polish United Workers' Party, in 1948 and became an informant for the Soviet supervised Main Directorate of Information of the Polish Army using the cover name Wolski. A BBC News profile of Jaruzelski states that his career "took off after the departure [from Poland] in 1956 of Polish-born Soviet Marshal, Konstantin Rokossovsky", who had been Poland's Commander-in-chief and Minister of Defence. Jaruzelski was elected to be a member of the Central Committee of the Polish United Workers' Party and became the Chief Political Officer of the Polish armed forces in 1960, its chief of staff in 1964; and Polish Minister of Defence in 1968, succeeding in the latter post Marshal Marian Spychalski.

In August 1968, Jaruzelski, as the defence minister, ordered the 2nd Army under General Florian Siwicki to invade Czechoslovakia, resulting in military occupation of northern Czechoslovakia until 11 November 1968 when under his orders and agreements with the Soviet Union his Polish troops were withdrawn and replaced by the Soviet Army. In 1970, he was involved in the successful plot against Władysław Gomułka, which led to the appointment of Edward Gierek as General Secretary of the Polish United Workers' Party. There is some question whether he took part in organising the violent suppression of striking workers or whether his orders to the Communist military led to massacres in the coastal cities of Gdańsk, Gdynia, Elbląg and Szczecin. As Minister of Defense, General Jaruzelski was ultimately responsible for 27,000 troops used against unarmed civilians. He claims that he was circumvented, which is why he never apologised for his involvement. Jaruzelski became a candidate member for the Politburo of the Polish United Workers' Party, the chief executive body of the party, obtaining full membership the following year.

== First Secretary of the PZPR (1981–1989) ==
=== Rise to power and installation of martial law ===
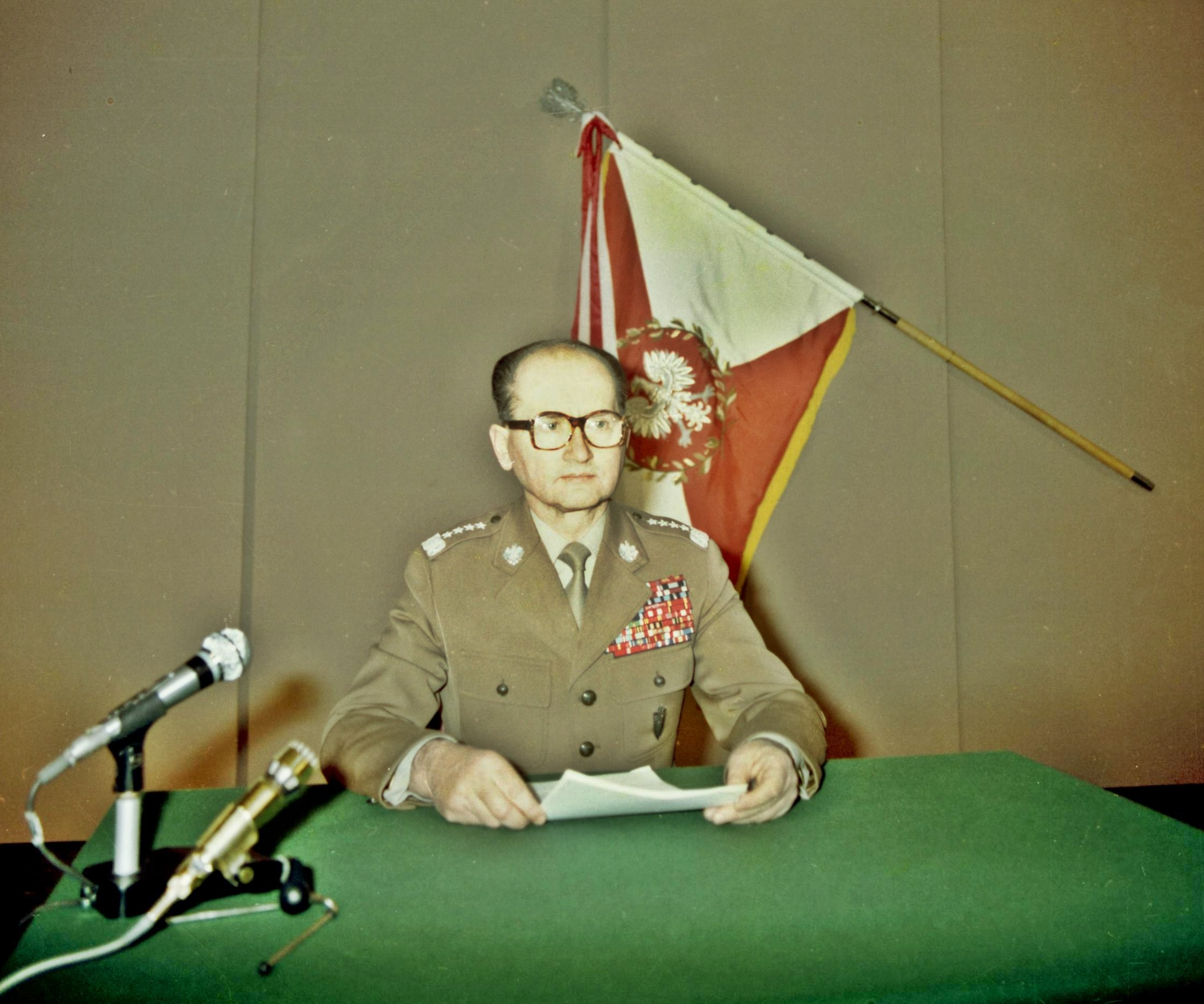
Jaruzelski in a television studio, preparing to announce the imposition of martial law, 1981

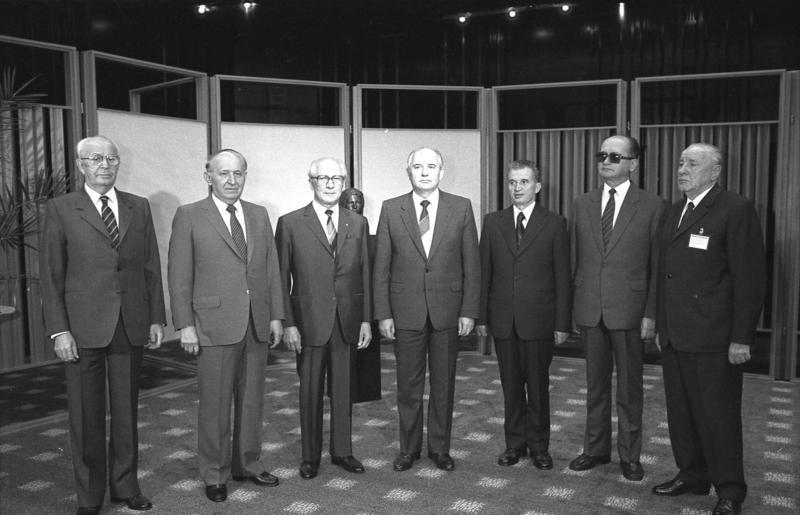
Jaruzelski (second from right) with other communist leaders and members of the Warsaw Pact, Berlin, 1987

On 11 February 1981, Jaruzelski was named Chairman of the Council of Ministers (Prime Minister). On 18 October, Stanisław Kania was ousted as First Secretary of the Central Committee of the Polish United Workers' Party (PZPR) after a listening device recorded him criticising the Soviet leadership. Jaruzelski was elected his successor, becoming the only professional soldier to become the leader of a ruling European Communist party.

A fortnight after taking power, Jaruzelski met with Solidarity head Lech Wałęsa and Catholic bishop Józef Glemp, and hinted that he wanted to bring the church and the union into a sort of coalition government. However, his intention was to crush Solidarity. As early as September, while he was still merely prime minister, he met with his aides to find an excuse to impose martial law. On 13 December, citing purported recordings of Solidarity leaders planning a coup, Jaruzelski organised his own coup by proclaiming martial law. A Military Council of National Salvation was formed, with Jaruzelski as chairman. A BBC News profile of Jaruzelski contends that the establishment of martial law was "an attempt to suppress the Solidarity movement".

Protests held in response to martial law were violently suppressed by the military of paramilitary units mostly by the use of water cannons, tear gas, batons, truncheons, and clubs, with one notable exception in Wujek: following a "shoot-to-kill" order, Motorized Reserves of the Citizens' Militia (ZOMO) units opened fire on demonstrators there, killing nine and wounding 21 others. The total number of deaths during martial law, while still uncertain and subject to dispute, is estimated to be 91 in total.

In spite of severe economic sanctions introduced by the Reagan Administration, martial law was largely successful in suppressing and demoralising the opposition, marginalising the Solidarity movement until the late 1980s. As demonstrators gradually declined towards the end of 1982, martial law was suspended on 31 December of that year, and was formally lifted (along with the final restrictions) on 22 July 1983.

=== Political stabilisation ===
In 1982, Jaruzelski helped reorganise the communist political alliance, Front of National Unity, as the Patriotic Movement for National Rebirth. At the invitation of Jaruzelski, a delegation of the ruling Hungarian Socialist Workers' Party visited Poland between 27 and 29 December of that year, with the Hungarian delegation sharing their experiences on crushing the 1956 Hungarian Revolution.

In 1985, Jaruzelski resigned as prime minister and defence minister and became the Chairman of the Polish Council of State, a post equivalent to that of the head of state of Poland. However, his power centred on and was firmly entrenched in his coterie of generals and lower ranks officers of the Polish Communist Army. There were plans in the government circles to award him the rank of Marshal of Poland, ultimately abandoned largely due to his own negative attitude towards the proposal.

Subsequent years saw his government and its internal security forces censor, persecute, and jail thousands of journalists and opposition activists without charge. The socio-economic crisis deepened even more than in the late 1970s and rationing of basic foods such as sugar, milk, and meat, as well as materials such as gasoline and consumer products, continued while the median income of the population fell by as much as 10%. During Jaruzelski's rule from 1981 to 1989, between 100,000 and 300,000 people left the country.

=== Political liberalisation ===
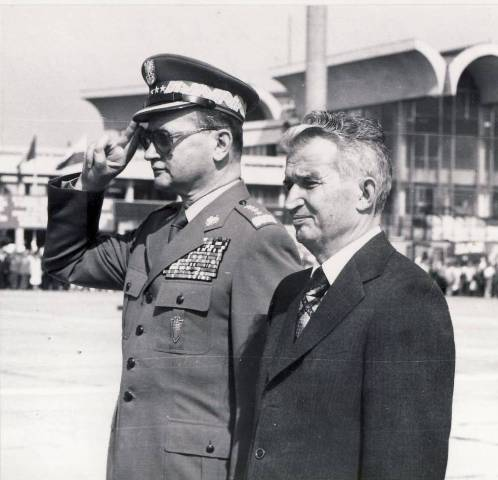
Jaruzelski with Nicolae Ceaușescu

The policies of Mikhail Gorbachev stimulated political reform in Poland as well as in other communist countries in Central and Eastern Europe.

From 6 February to 4 April 1989, negotiations were held between 13 working groups during 94 sessions of the roundtable talks. These negotiations "radically altered the shape" of the Polish government and society, and resulted in an agreement which stated that a great degree of political power would be given to a newly created bicameral legislature. It also restored the post of president to act as head of state and chief executive. Solidarity was also declared a legal organisation. During the ensuing partially-free elections, the Communists and their allies were allocated 65% of the seats in the Sejm. Solidarity won all the remaining elected seats, and 99 out of the 100 seats in the fully elected Senate were also won by Solidarity-backed candidates. Amid such a crushing defeat, there were fears Jaruzelski would annul the results. However, he allowed them to stand. Jaruzelski was elected by parliament to the position of president. He was the only candidate.

== President of Poland (1989–1990) ==
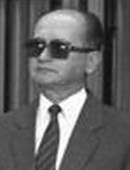
- Presidency of Wojciech Jaruzelski; 19 July 1989 – 22 December 1990
- President: Wojciech Jaruzelski
- Party: PZPR (until 1990); Independent
- Election: 1989
- Seat: Belweder

Jaruzelski was unsuccessful in convincing Lech Wałęsa to include Solidarity in a "grand coalition" with the Communists. He resigned as first secretary of the PZPR on 29 July 1989. Mieczysław Rakowski succeeded him as party leader. The Communists initially intended to give Solidarity a few token cabinet posts for the sake of appearances. However, Wałęsa persuaded the Communists' two allied parties, the United People's Party (ZSL) and the Alliance of Democrats (SD), to break their alliance with the PZPR.

Accepting that he would have to appoint a Solidarity member as prime minister, Jaruzelski then asked Wałęsa to select three candidates, one of whom he would ask to form a government. Ultimately, Tadeusz Mazowiecki, who had helped organise the roundtable talks, was selected as the first non-Communist prime minister of an Eastern Bloc country in four decades. Jaruzelski resigned as president in 1990. He was succeeded by Wałęsa, who had won the presidential election on 9 December.

== After retirement ==
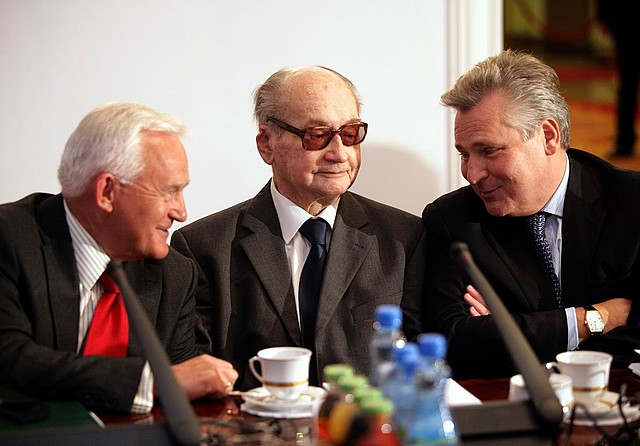
Meeting of the National Security Council on 24 November 2010. Jaruzelski in the middle along with Leszek Miller (left) and Aleksander Kwaśniewski (right)

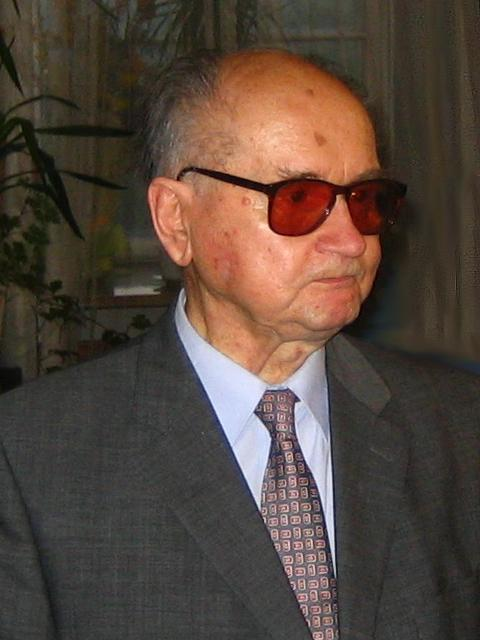
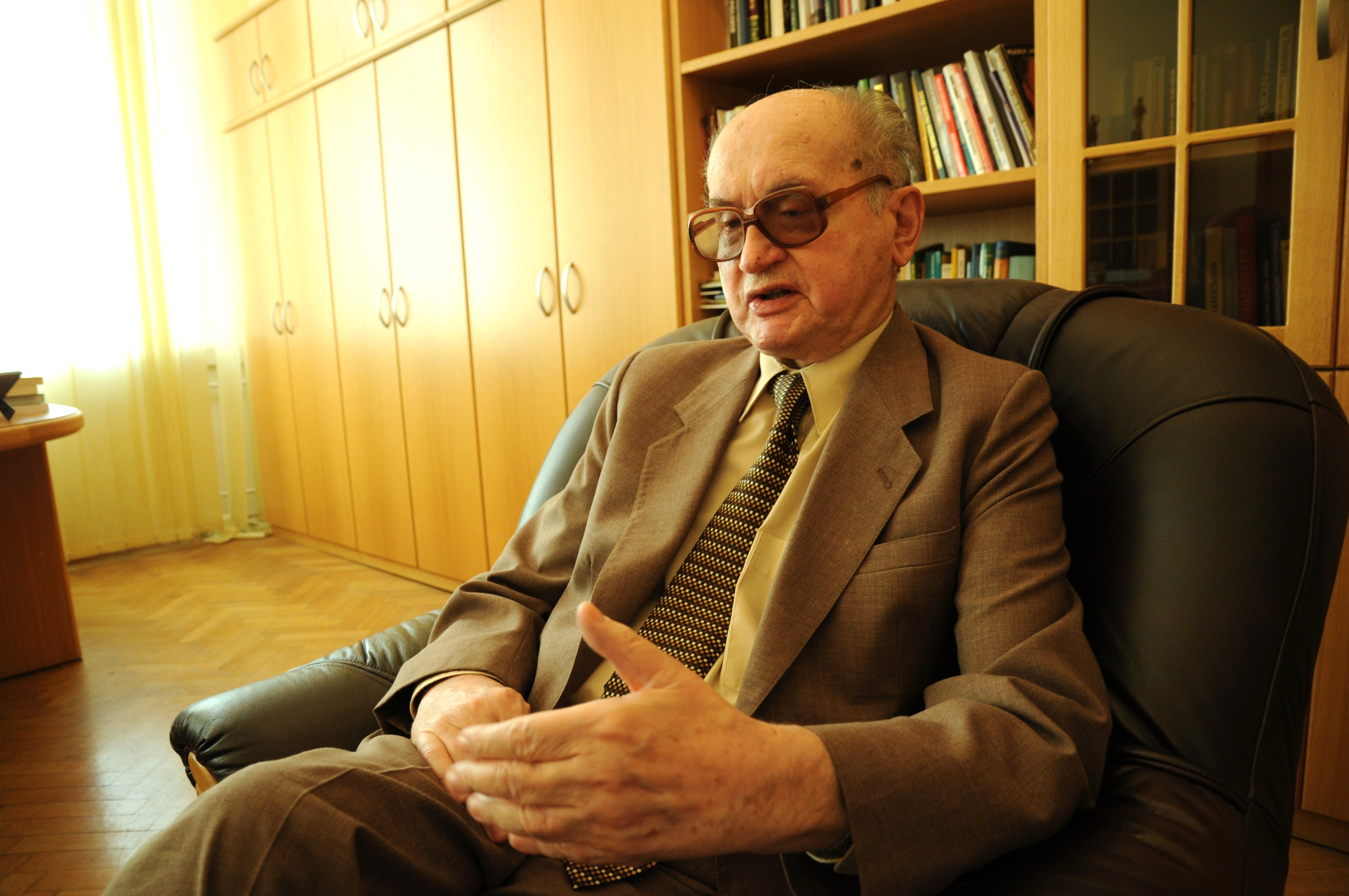
Jaruzelski in 2006 and 2009.

In October 1994, while attending a book-selling activity in Wrocław, Jaruzelski was attacked by a male pensioner with a stone; his jaw was injured, requiring surgery. The attacker, who had been imprisoned during the martial law period, was sentenced to two years' imprisonment and fined 2,000,000 złoty.

In an interview in 2001, Jaruzelski said that he believed communism failed and that he was now a social democrat. He also announced his support for President Aleksander Kwaśniewski and Leszek Miller, later Prime Minister. Both Kwaśniewski and Miller were members of the Democratic Left Alliance, the social democratic party that included most of the remains of the PZPR.

In May 2005, Russian President Vladimir Putin awarded a medal commemorating the 60th anniversary of victory over Nazi Germany to Jaruzelski and other former leaders, including former Romanian King Michael I. Czech President Václav Klaus criticised this step, saying that Jaruzelski was a symbol of the Warsaw Pact invasion of Czechoslovakia in 1968. Jaruzelski said that he had apologised and that the decision on the August 1968 invasion had been a great "political and moral mistake".

On 28 March 2006, Jaruzelski was awarded a Siberian Exiles Cross by Polish President Lech Kaczyński. However, after making this fact public, Kaczyński said that this was a mistake and blamed his staff for giving him a document containing 1,293 names without notifying him of Jaruzelski's inclusion. After this statement, Jaruzelski returned the cross.

On 31 March 2006, the Institute of National Remembrance charged Jaruzelski with committing communist crimes, mainly the creation of a criminal military organisation with the aim of carrying out criminal acts — mostly concerned with the illegal imprisonment of people. A second charge involved inciting state ministers to commit acts beyond their competence. Jaruzelski evaded most court appearances, citing poor health. In December 2010, Jaruzelski suffered from severe pneumonia and, in March 2011, he was diagnosed with lymphoma.

== Death ==
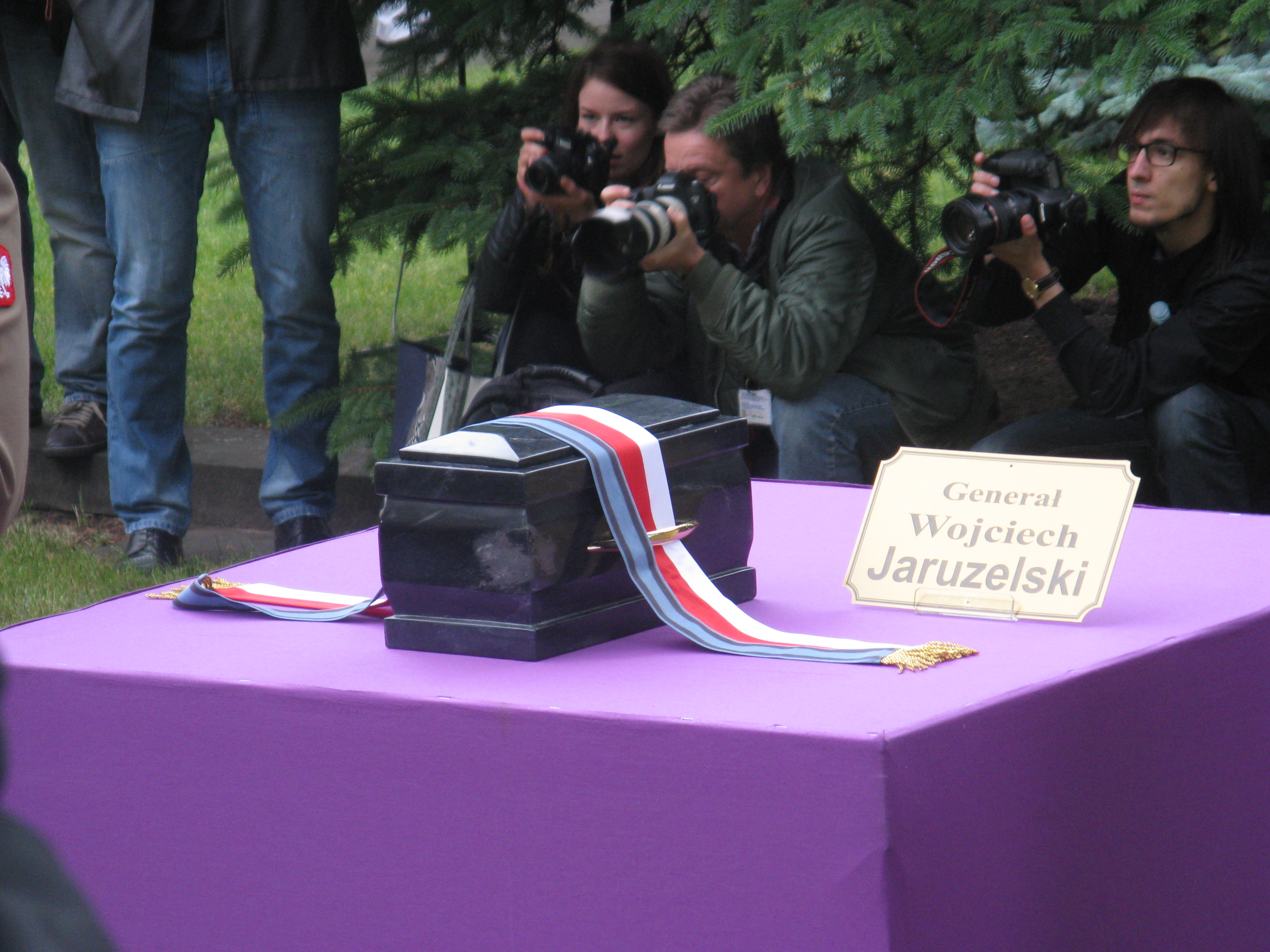
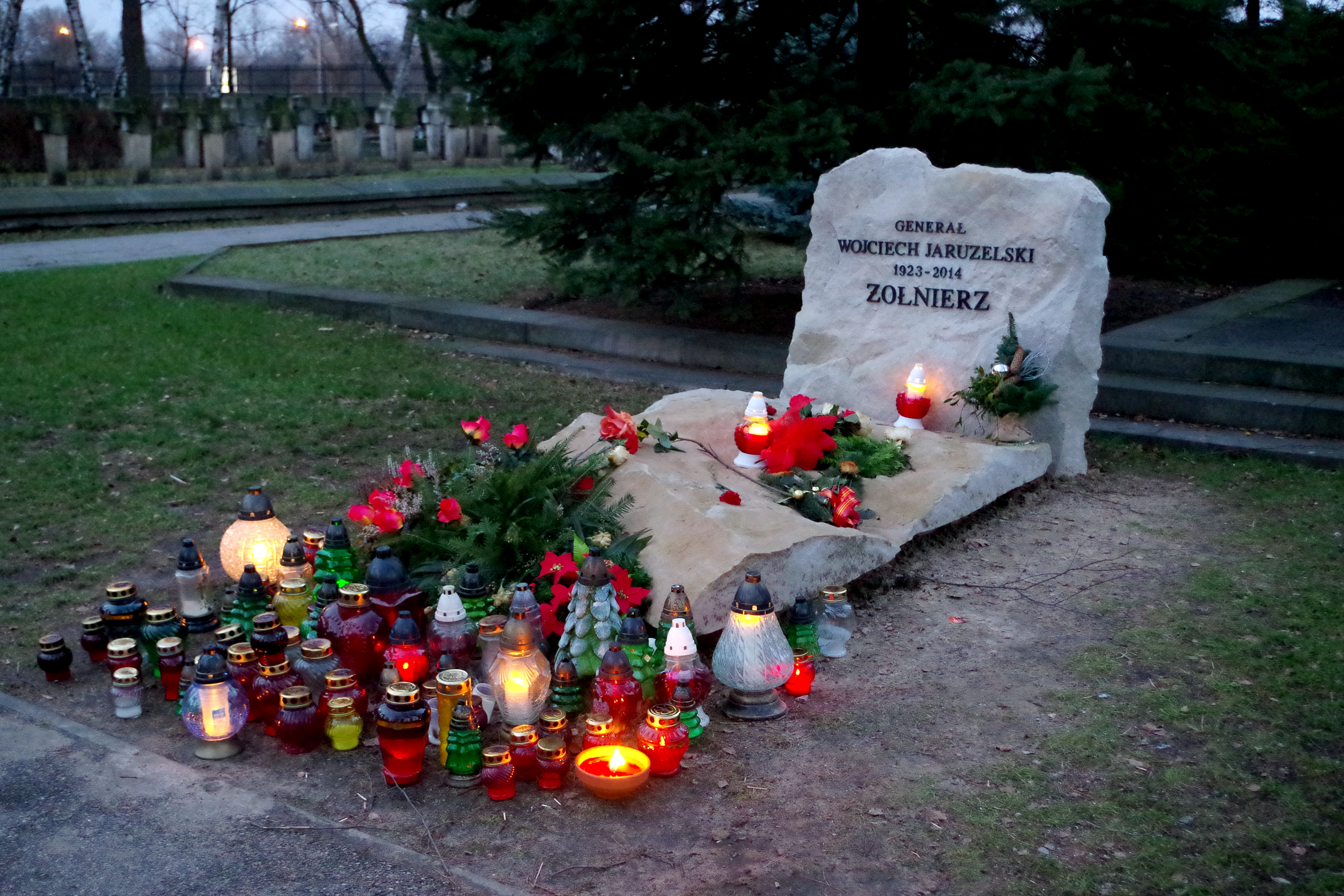
Left: Urn containing the ashes of Jaruzelski
Right: Jaruzelski's grave at Powązki Military Cemetery in Warsaw

Jaruzelski died on 25 May 2014 in a Warsaw hospital after suffering a stroke earlier that month. He had reportedly requested confession and last rites by a Roman Catholic priest. President Bronisław Komorowski, former Presidents Lech Wałęsa and Aleksander Kwaśniewski, and hundreds of other Poles attended his funeral mass at the Field Cathedral of the Polish Army in Warsaw on 30 May. Wałęsa and Komorowski, who were among the thousands imprisoned during the crackdown on Solidarity in 1981, both said that judgment against Jaruzelski "would be left to God". Jaruzelski was cremated and buried with full military honours at Powązki Military Cemetery in Warsaw, near the grave of Bolesław Bierut, the first Communist leader of Poland after World War II. The decision to bury Jaruzelski at the Powązki Military Cemetery caused protests.

== Personal life ==
Jaruzelski married Barbara Halina Jaruzelska (1931–2017) in 1961. They had a daughter, Monika who was born on 11 August 1963.

== Legacy ==
=== Domestic perception ===
In the years shortly succeeding the 1989 democratic transformation, Jaruzelski maintained an overall positive image. According to Centre for Public Opinion Research (CBOS) polls, Jaruzelski began his brief presidency with a 74% approval rating, although by the end of his presidency, his approval shrunk to 32%. In 1994, an OBOP poll showed 52% of Poles respected Jaruzelski over Wałęsa as a politician, whereas only 24% preferred Wałęsa. In 2008, a CBOS poll showed 46% approved of Jaruzelski's historical political activity, whereas 29% rated him negatively. Compared to his predecessors, he ranked above Władysław Gomułka (34% approved/37% disapproved) and Bolesław Bierut (19/42%), but below Edward Gierek (55/24%). However, further after the fall of communism, Jaruzelski's popularity degraded: another CBOS poll from 2018 showed only 28% ranked his actions positively, and 42% negatively.

Much like Jaruzelski's approval, the decision to implement martial law was historically perceived as positive, although with decreasing popularity in time. Throughout the post-communist period, poll respondents generally found the decision to introduce martial law justified. OBOP polls showed that from 1995 to 2016, at least a plurality — from 41 to 54% — of respondents saw the decision as justified. CBOS polls from 1994 to 2016 also generally showed Poles agreed with the decision to impose martial law, with a plurality — 41 to 54% — deeming it the "right decision", although a 2021 poll indicated a plurality of 37% perceived it as "wrong" (with 31% perceiving it as "right"). In a 1994 OBOP poll, 71% of respondents disagreed with penalising Jaruzelski for the introduction of martial law, with only 15% agreeing.

=== Foreign perception ===
Rossiyskaya Gazeta presented Jaruzelski as the harbinger of Poland's democracy. Croatian writer Slavenka Drakulić described Jaruzelski as a "tragic believer in Communism who made a pact with the devil in good faith".

=== Justification for imposing martial law ===
According to Jaruzelski, an internal crackdown on Solidarity through martial law was necessary to avoid a Soviet invasion. In a May 1992 interview with Der Spiegel, Jaruzelski said: "Given the strategic logic of the time, I probably would have acted the same way if I had been a Soviet general. At that time, Soviet political and strategic interests were threatened." Jaruzelski also claimed in 1997 that Washington had given him a "green light", stating that he had sent Eugeniusz Molczyk to confer with Vice-President George H. W. Bush, who had agreed with Molczyk that martial law was the lesser of two evils. Whether this meeting with the American vice-president occurred is disputed. While it is erroneously cited, Harvard historian Mark Kramer has pointed out that no documents support Jaruzelski's claim. At a press conference in September of that same year, however, former Warsaw Pact forces supreme commander Viktor Kulikov denied that the Soviet Union had either threatened or intended to intervene.

Historical evidence released under Boris Yeltsin's presidency paints a more complicated picture: while Eastern Bloc countries were fully in favour of a crackdown on Solidarity, minutes from Politburo, Warsaw Pact and special commission meetings from the year leading up martial law details strong internal divisions on the question of intervening: Senior Soviet party figures and ministers in a special commission formed to respond to developments in Poland, such as Mikhail Suslov, Yuri Andropov, Andrei Gromyko, and Dmitriy Ustinov were reluctant to intervene, citing the 1970 Polish protests and the ongoing Soviet-Afghan war, while the Soviet leader Leonid Brezhnev, along with East German and Czechoslovak leaders Erich Honecker and Gustáv Husák, expressed a strong willingness to intervene if necessary. To this end, plans were made for a joint Soviet, East German and Czechoslovak attack under the pretext of a Warsaw Pact military exercise called "Soyuz-80", (dubbed Operation Krkonoše in Czechoslovakia) in December 1980; Before it could be carried out, Brezhnev was convinced by Stanisław Kania to postpone the planned invasion in order to give Polish leadership a chance.

By the time of Jaruzelski's rise to power, the Soviet leadership's anti-intervention faction had prevailed thanks to the influence of Yuri Andropov, who at this point was already a highly influential figure in the Politburo: minutes from their 29 October 1981 meeting detail a discussion of Jaruzelski's demands for military support if he failed to control the situation, which were unanimously rejected. Contrary to his public statements after the fact, Jaruzelski was in fact highly insistent on Warsaw Pact military support. Following a long back-and-forth at Warsaw Pact and Politburo meetings, in which even a proposed bluffing statement of support was vetoed by Romania, any notion of a Warsaw Pact intervention was firmly and consequently shut down by Andropov in a Politburo meeting three days before Jaruzelski's proclamation: "We do not intend to introduce troops into Poland. That is the proper position, and we must adhere to it until the end. I don't know how things will turn out in Poland, but even if Poland falls under the control of Solidarity, that's the way it will be."

== Written works ==
"Stan wojenny. Dlaczego..." (1992)

Różnić się mądrze (English translation: To Differ Wisely; 1999).

"Wyjaśniam" (2001)

"Przed sądem" (2002)

"Przeciwko bezprawiu" (2004)

"Pod prąd. Refleksje rocznicowe" (2005)

"Historia nie powinna dzielić" (2006)

"Być może to ostatnie słowo (wyjaśnienia złożone przed Sądem)" (English translation: "It may be the last word (explanations given in the Court)"; 2008).

"Starsi o 30 lat" (2011)

== Promotions ==
- Chorąży (Standard-bearer) – 16 December 1943
- Podporucznik (Second lieutenant) – 11 November 1944
- Porucznik (First lieutenant) – 25 April 1945
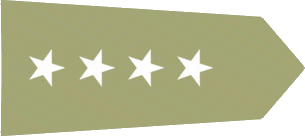
- Kapitan (Captain) – 22 July 1946
- Major (Major) – 10 July 1948
- Podpułkownik (Lieutenant colonel) – 25 January 1949
- Pułkownik (Colonel) – 31 December 1953
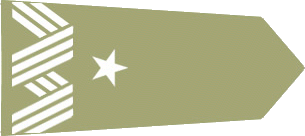
- Generał brygady (Brigadier general) – 14 July 1956
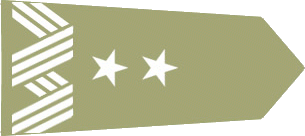
- Generał dywizji (Major general) – 13 July 1960
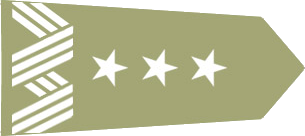
- Generał broni (Lieutenant general) – 9 July 1968
- Generał armii (General) – 23 September 1973

== Honours and awards ==
Poland

| Silver Cross of the Virtuti Militari |
| Officer's Cross of the Order of Polonia Restituta |
| Knight's Cross of the Order of Polonia Restituta – 5 November 1948 |
| Order of the Builders of People's Poland |
| Order of the Banner of Labour, 1st class |
| Order of the Cross of Grunwald, 3rd class – 2 September 1945 |
| Cross of Valour (twice) – 24 June 1945, 14 January 1946 |
| Silver Cross of Merit – 20 July 1945 |
| Silver Medal for Merit on the Field of Glory" (thrice) – 4 February 1945, 27 March 1945, 12 May 1945 |
| Medal "For Participation in the Fights in Defence of the People's Power" |
| Medal of the 10th Anniversary of People's Poland – 1954 |
| Medal of the 30th Anniversary of People's Poland – 1974 |
| Medal of the 40th Anniversary of People's Poland – 1984 |
| Medal "For Oder, Neisse and the Baltic" |
| Medal "For Warsaw 1939-1945" |
| Medal "For Participation in the Battles for Berlin" |
| Medal of Victory and Freedom 1945 |
| Gold Medal of the Armed Forces in the Service of the Fatherland |
| Silver Medal of the Armed Forces in the Service of the Fatherland |
| Bronze Medal of the Armed Forces in the Service of the Fatherland |
| Gold Medal of Merit for National Defence |
| Silver Medal of Merit for National Defence |
| Bronze Medal of Merit for National Defence |
| Medal of the National Education Commission |
| Medal Pro Memoria – 2005 |
| Gold Medal of Janek Krasicki |
| Polish State Millennium Badge |

Soviet Union

| Order of Lenin (twice) – 1968 and 1983 |
| Order of the October Revolution – 1973 |
| Order of the Red Banner – 1978 |
| Order of Friendship of Peoples – 1973 |
| Jubilee Medal "In Commemoration of the 100th Anniversary of the Birth of Vladimir Ilyich Lenin" – 1969 |
| Medal "For the Liberation of Warsaw" – 1945 |
| Medal "For the Capture of Berlin" – 1945 |
| Medal "For the Victory over Germany in the Great Patriotic War 1941–1945" – 1945 |
| Jubilee Medal "Twenty Years of Victory in the Great Patriotic War 1941–1945" – 1965 |
| Jubilee Medal "Thirty Years of Victory in the Great Patriotic War 1941–1945" – 1975 |
| Jubilee Medal "Forty Years of Victory in the Great Patriotic War 1941–1945" – 1985 |
| Jubilee Medal "50 Years of the Armed Forces of the USSR" – 1968 |
| Jubilee Medal "60 Years of the Armed Forces of the USSR" – 1978 |
| Jubilee Medal "70 Years of the Armed Forces of the USSR" – 1988 |
| Medal "For Strengthening of Brotherhood in Arms" – 1979 |

Other countries

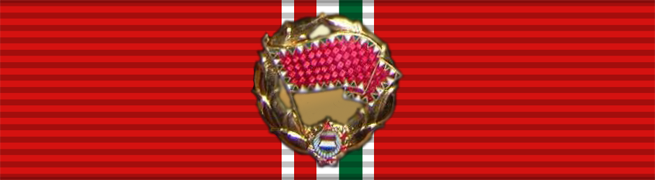
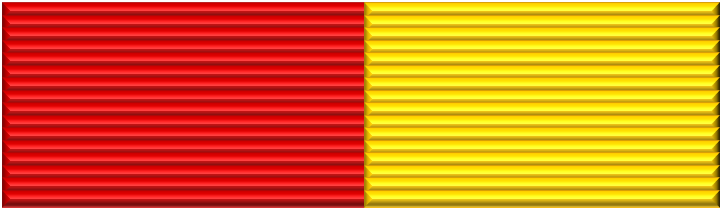
| Commander of the Order of the Crown (Belgium) – 1967 |
| Order of Georgi Dimitrov (Bulgaria) – 1983 |
| Medal of 30th Anniversary of the Bulgarian Armed Forces (Bulgaria) – 1974 |
| Order of José Martí (Cuba) – 1983 |
| Collar of the Order of the White Lion (Czechoslovakia) – 1978 |
| Order of Klement Gottwald (Czechoslovakia) – 1983 |
| Order of the Red Banner (Czechoslovakia) – 1971 |
| Medal “For Strengthening Friendship in Arms”, Golden class (Czechoslovakia) |
| Grand Cross of the White Rose of Finland (Finland) – 1989 |
| Grand Cross of the Legion d'Honneur (France) – 1989 |
| Order of Karl Marx (East Germany) – 1983 |
| Scharnhorst Order (East Germany) – 1975 |
| Grand Cross of Order of the Redeemer (Greece) – 1987 |
| Order of the Flag of the Republic of Hungary, 1st with diamonds (Hungary) – 1983 |
| Order of the Red Banner (Hungary) – 1977 |
| Medal of 60th Anniversary of the End of World War II (Israel) – 2005 |
| Knight Grand Cross with Ribbon of the Order of Merit of the Italian Republic (Italy) – 1989 |
| Collar of the Order of Isabella the Catholic (Spain) |
| Order of Sukhbaatar (Mongolia) – 1977 |
| Order of the Red Banner (Mongolia) – 1983 |
| Order of the National Flag, 1st class (North Korea) – 1977 |
| Grand Collar of the Order of Prince Henry (Portugal) |
| Order of the Star of the Romanian People's Republic, 1st class (Romania) – 1983 |
| Gold Medal "Virtutea Ostăşească" (Romania) – 1971 |
| Medal of Zhukov (Russia) – 1996 |
| Jubilee Medal "50 Years of Victory in the Great Patriotic War 1941–1945" (Russia) – 1995 |
| Jubilee Medal "60 Years of Victory in the Great Patriotic War 1941–1945" (Russia) – 2005 |
| Gold Star Order (Vietnam) – 1983 |

== Bibliography ==
- Berger, Manfred E., Jaruzelski: Traitor or Patriot? Hutchinson, 1990, ISBN 0091744660
- Berger, Manfred E. and Zbigniew Bauer, Jaruzelski. Kraków: Oficyna Cracovia, 1991, ISBN 8385104216
- Labedz, Leopold, Poland Under Jaruzelski: A Comprehensive Sourcebook on Poland During and After Martial Law. New York: Scribner, 1984, ISBN 0684181169
- Pelinka, Anton Politics of the Lesser Evil: Leadership, Democracy, & Jaruzelski's Poland. Transaction Publishers, 1999. ISBN 1560003677
- Swidlicki, Andrzej. Political Trials in Poland, 1981–1986. London: Croom Helm, 1988. ISBN 0709944446
- Weschler, Lawrence. The Passion of Poland, from Solidarity Through the State of War. Pantheon Books, 1982. ISBN 0394722868
- Yanshun, Liu, "Jaruzelski, the Shaker of Polish History" Beijing, Shijie Zhishi, 2016, ISBN 9787501252299

Political offices
| Preceded by Józef Pińkowski | Prime Minister of Poland; 11 February 1981 – 6 November 1985 | Succeeded by Zbigniew Messner |
| Preceded by Henryk Jabłoński | Chairman of the Council of State; 6 November 1985 – 19 July 1989 | Succeeded by Office abolished |
| Preceded by Office restored Bolesław Bierut (in Poland) | President of Poland; 19 July 1989 – 22 December 1990 | Succeeded by Lech Wałęsa |
Party political offices
| Preceded by Stanisław Kania | First Secretary of the Polish United Workers' Party; 18 October 1981 – 29 July 1989 | Succeeded by Mieczysław Rakowski |
