= Waleska Crespo Rivera =

Puerto Rican businessperson and university administrator

President of Universidad Central del Caribe
- Incumbent
- Assumed office February 2018
- Preceded by: José Ginel Rodríguez

Personal details
- Education: University of Puerto Rico, Río Piedras Campus (BS); University of Puerto Rico, Medical Sciences Campus (MHSA, DPH)
- Occupation: businessperson, administrator

Waleska Crespo Rivera is a Puerto Rican businessperson and academic administrator. She is president of Universidad Central del Caribe.

== Education ==
Crespo Rivera completed a bachelor's degree and internship in Nutrition and Dietetics with a focus in diabetes and obesity management at University of Puerto Rico, Río Piedras Campus. In 2000, she completed a master's degree health services management and administration (MHSA) at University of Puerto Rico, Medical Sciences Campus (UPR-RCM) where she also completed a doctor of public health (DPH) with a focus on health services management and administration.

== Career ==
Crespo Rivera was the executive director and chief executive officer of the Cardiovascular Center for Puerto Rico and the Caribbean. She was an adjunct professor in health services administration at University of Puerto Rico, Medical Sciences Campus. She served on the board of the Puerto Rico Hospital Association, Puerto Rico Comprehensive Cancer Center, and the Puerto Rico Medical Tourism Corporation. Crespo Rivera was the executive director of Healthsouth Rehabilitation Hospital in Manatí, Puerto Rico and an administrator at the Hospital Hermanos Meléndez. In February 2018, she became president of the Universidad Central del Caribe, succeeding her predecessor José Ginel Rodríguez.

== See also ==
- List of women presidents or chancellors of co-ed colleges and universities
