= Anna Komorowska =

First Lady of Poland

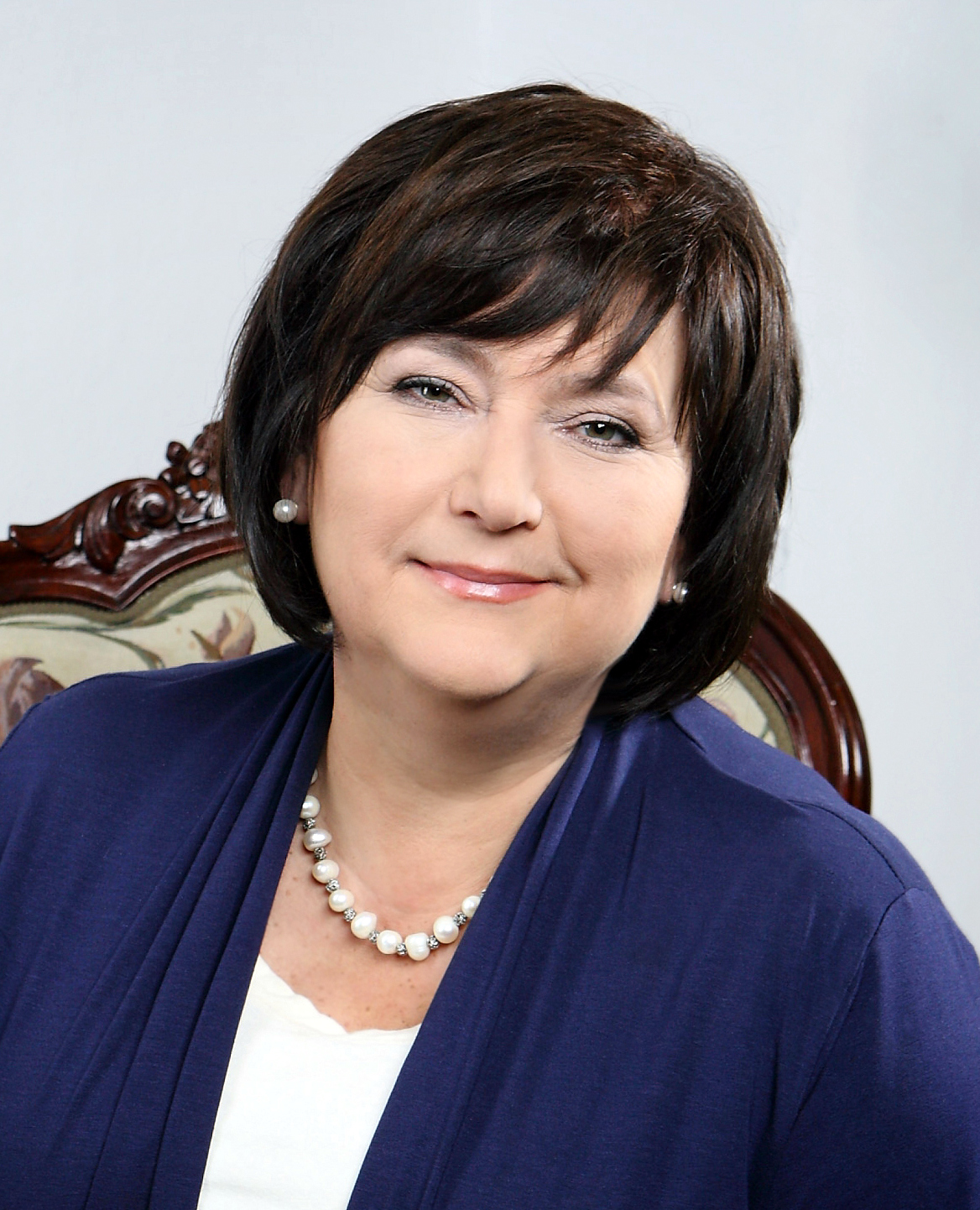
- Official portrait, 2010

First Lady of Poland
- In role 6 August 2010 – 6 August 2015
- President: Bronisław Komorowski
- Preceded by: Maria Kaczyńska
- Succeeded by: Agata Kornhauser-Duda

Personal details
- Born: Anna Julia Dziadzia; 11 May 1953 (age 73) Warsaw, Poland
- Spouse: Bronisław Komorowski (m. 1977)
- Children: 5
- Education: University of Warsaw
- Awards: Order of the Polar Star Order of Merit (Portugal) Order of Merit of the Italian Republic Order of Saint-Charles Royal Norwegian Order of Merit Grand Order of Queen Jelena Order of the Cross of Terra Mariana Order of the Netherlands Lion

Anna Julia Komorowska (born Anna Julia Dziadzia, then Dembowska; 11 May 1953) is a Polish classical philologist and former First Lady of Poland, as the wife of 5th President of Poland, Bronisław Komorowski.

== Early life and education ==
She was born to Jan Dziadzia and Józefa Deptuła (born as Hana Rojer). Both of her parents worked for the communist Ministry of Public Security in post-war Poland. Her maternal grandparents Wolf and Estera Rojer were killed in the Holocaust. The family later changed their name to "Dembowski".

Anna Dembowska studied at the Tadeusz Rejtan Lyceum and went on to read classical philology at the University of Warsaw, graduating in 1977 with a master's degree.

== Career ==
Komorowska started her working life as a Latin language teacher in a high school. She met Bronisław Komorowski in 1970, when she was a member of the Czarna Jedynka. They married in 1977. They have five children: Zofia (born 1979), Tadeusz (born 1981), Maria (born 1983), Piotr (born 1985) and Elżbieta (born 1987). After the introduction of martial law in Poland, her husband was interned. On 31 December 1981, she reached his internment camp as one of the first three women ever to do so. After the fall of communism in Poland, she worked for an insurance company for five years after she left her teaching career voluntarily.

== Honours ==
=== Foreign honours ===
- Croatia: Grand Cross of the Grand Order of Queen Jelena (3 July 2013)
- Monaco: Grand Officer of the Order of Saint Charles (17 October 2012)
- Sweden: Commander with the Great Cross Order of the Northern Star (4 May 2011)

Honorary titles
Preceded by Maria Kaczyńska	First Lady of Poland; 2010–2015	Succeeded by Agata Kornhauser-Duda
