= Jolanta Kwaśniewska =

Polish lawyer and charity activist (born 1955)

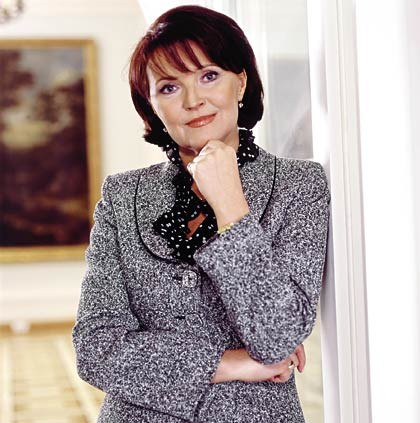

First Lady of Poland
- In role 23 December 1995 – 23 December 2005
- President: Aleksander Kwaśniewski
- Preceded by: Danuta Wałęsa
- Succeeded by: Maria Kaczyńska

Personal details
- Born: Jolanta Konty; 3 June 1956 (age 70) Wrzawy, Poland
- Spouse: Aleksander Kwaśniewski (m. 1979)
- Children: Aleksandra Kwaśniewska
- Education: University of Gdańsk
- Awards: Order of Leopold - Grand Cross Order of the Cross of Terra Mariana - First Class Order of Isabella the Catholic - Grand Cross Order of the Precious Crown - 1st Class National Order of Merit Order of Merit of the Federal Republic of Germany - Grand Cross Order of Meit of Norway - Grand Cross Order of Merit of Portugal - Grand Cross Cross of the President of the Slovak Republic - 1st Class Medal of Dr. Henry Jordan Order of the Smile

Jolanta Kwaśniewska (Polish: [jɔˈlanta kfaɕˈɲɛfska], née Konty, [ˈkɔntɨ]; born 3 June 1956) is a Polish lawyer and charity activist who was First Lady of Poland between 1995 and 2005, as the wife of the then President Aleksander Kwaśniewski.

== Biography ==
She was a graduate of the 9th High School in Gdańsk. In 1979, she graduated from the Faculty of Law and Administration at the University of Gdańsk, then tried to pass the judge's apprenticeship exam. During her studies, she was the head of the faculty council of the Socialist Union of Polish Students.

In November 1979, she married Aleksander Kwasniewski. On February 16, 1981, she gave birth to a daughter, Aleksandra. In 1984, she started her professional career in the Swedish-Polish Polish diaspora PAAT, producing, among others, imitation jewellery for the Soviet Union market. In this company, she was, among others Chief Commercial Officer. In 1991 she started her own business - a real estate agency called Royal Wilanów, which she founded with the wife of Ireneusz Nawrocki, later president of Powszechny Zakład Ubezpieczeń (PZU) Życie. She managed this agency until her husband took the office of President of Poland in 1995. During her husband's office, the company was handed over to trusteeship. After the end of the second presidential term of her husband in 2005, she returned to the management of this agency.

== Personal life ==
She met the future president while she was a law student at the University of Gdańsk, and they married in 1979. During her studies, she was the president of the executive committee of the Socialist Union of Polish Students, in which her husband was also active.

She has been widely involved in charity work, and in 1997 founded the charity foundation Porozumienie bez barier ("Understanding Without Barriers"), whose aims include providing help and support to sick and disabled children.

She is also the host of the television show Lekcja stylu ("Lessons in Style") on TVN Style.

== Honours ==
- Belgium: Grand Cordon of the Order of Leopold (1999)
- Estonia: 1st class of the Order of the Cross of Terra Mariana
- Latvia: Commander Grand Cross of the Order of the Three Stars

Honorary titles
Preceded by Danuta Wałęsa	First Lady of Poland; 1995–2005	Succeeded by Maria Kaczyńska
