= Danuta Wałęsa =

Former First Lady of Poland

Mirosława Danuta Wałęsa
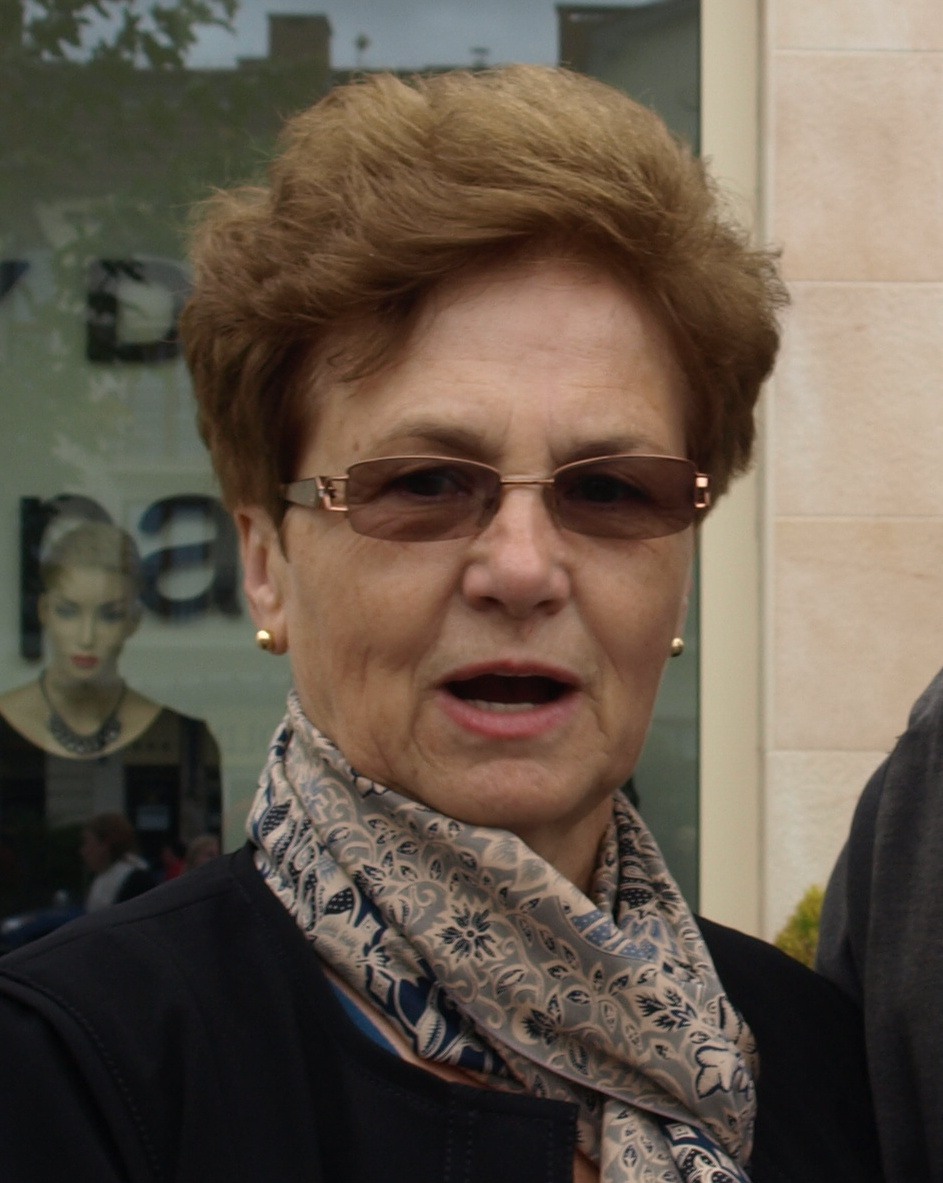
- Wałęsa in 2012

First Lady of Poland
- In role 22 December 1990 – 22 December 1995
- President: Lech Wałęsa
- Preceded by: Barbara Jaruzelska (in country); Karolina Kaczorowska (in exile)
- Succeeded by: Jolanta Kwaśniewska

Personal details
- Born: Mirosława Danuta Gołoś; 25 February 1949 (age 77) Węgrów, Poland
- Spouse: Lech Wałęsa (m. 1969)
- Children: 8, including Jarosław
- Awards: Order of Polonia Restituta - Commander's Cross with Star

Mirosława Danuta Wałęsa (Polish: [mirɔˈswava daˈnuta vaˈwɛ̃sa]; née Gołoś [ˈɡɔwɔɕ]; born 25 February 1949) is the wife of former President of Poland Lech Wałęsa. In 1983 she accepted the Nobel Peace Prize in Oslo on behalf of her husband, who feared, at a time of great political upheaval in the country, that the Polish government might not allow him to return if he travelled to Oslo himself. Lech and Danuta have been married since 8 November 1969 and have eight children.

Danuta grew up the second of nine children in Krypy village near Węgrów (Krypy, Gmina Liw). She was working in a flower shop near the Lenin Shipyard in Gdańsk when she met Lech Wałęsa, then an electrician. After they married, she began using her middle name more than her first name, per Lech's request. She was more resolutely anti-Communist than her husband. During her husband's frequent interrogations by the SB in the 1980s, she was known to openly taunt officers who came to pick him up.

Released in 2011, Danuta Wałęsa's autobiography Marzenia i tajemnice ("Dreams and Secrets", coauthored with Piotr Adamowicz) has sold over 400,000 copies.

In 2022, she was awarded the title of an Honorary Citizen of Gdańsk.

Honorary titles
Preceded by Barbara Jaruzelska; In country	First Lady of Poland; 1990–1995	Succeeded by Jolanta Kwaśniewska
Preceded by Karolina Kaczorowska; In exile	First Lady of Poland; 1990–1995	Succeeded by Jolanta Kwaśniewska
