= Opinion polling on the Karol Nawrocki presidency =

Surveying of the Polish administration since 2025

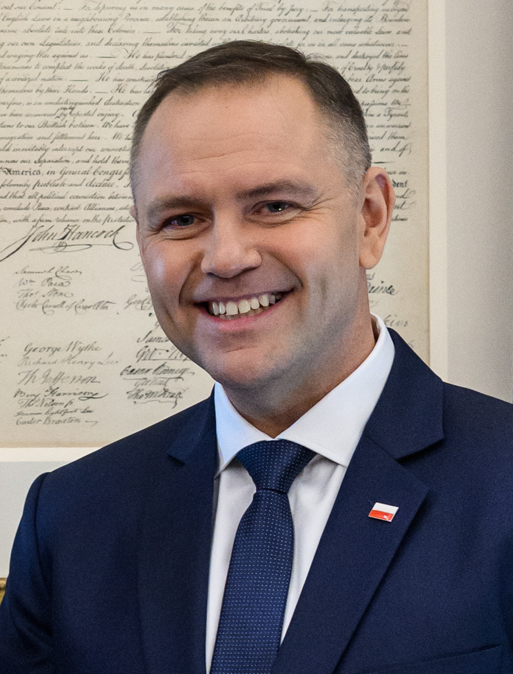
Karol Nawrocki in 2025.

Karol Nawrocki was elected to the office of President of Poland in the 2025 presidential election, and inaugurated on 6 August 2025. During Nawrocki's presidency, several polling agencies have conducted opinion polls researching support for issues regarding his time in office.

== Approval polls ==
=== Approval rating ===
Graphical summary of approval polls

Date(s) conducted	Polling firm/Link	Sample size	Approve	Disapprove	Neither	Don't know/Neutral	Net approval
2–5 Nov 2026	OGB	1,000	46.0	38.3	15.7		7.7
1–11 Oct 2026	CBOS	1,028	51	39		10	12
1–7 Oct 2026	OGB	1,000	47.4	35.2	17.4		12.2
14–27 Sep 2026	CBOS	956	51	40		8	11
21–22 Sep 2026	Pollster / "SE.pl"	1,029	44	39	15	3	5
18–22 Sep 2026	OGB	1,000	45.5	37.2	17.3		8.3
20–30 Aug 2026	CBOS	935	51	40		9	11
21–23 Aug 2026	United Surveys / WP.pl (Note: Question wording: "How do you rate Karol Nawrocki's presidency so far?")	1,000	49.2	38.1		12.7	11.1
5–12 Aug 2026	OGB	1,000	52.5	35.1	12.4		17.4
4–5 Aug 2026	SW Research / Zero.pl (Note: Question wording: "Do you believe Karol Nawrocki is a good president?")	803	46.5	38.2		15.3	8.3
4–5 Aug 2026	SW Research / Zero.pl (Note: Question wording: "How do you rate one year of Karol Nawrocki's presidency?")	803	44.7	39.8		15.5	4.9
24–25 Jul 2026	United Surveys / WP.pl	1,000	56.0	40.5		3.5	15.5
16–17 Jul 2026	Pollster / "SE.pl" (Note: Question wording: "How do you rate one year of Karol Nawrocki as president?")	1,021	47	43		10	4
2–12 Jul 2026	CBOS	938	56	37		7	19
8 Jul 2026	SW Research / Onet	809	40.2	38.2		21.6	2.0
24–27 Jun 2026	IBRiS / Polsat News	1,000	51.7	38.9		9.3	12.8
11–21 Jun 2026	CBOS	991	51	39		10	12
29 May – 2 Jun 2026	IBRiS / Polsat News	1,000	48.1	47.9		4.0	0.2
28–29 May 2026	United Surveys / WP.pl	1,000	48.2	50.1		1.7	–1.9
7–17 May 2026	CBOS	1,041	46	42		12	4
28 Apr – 11 May 2026	OGB	1,000	44.3	39.8	15.9		4.5
16–27 Apr 2026	OGB	1,000	48.3	36.6	15.2		11.7
9–19 Apr 2026	CBOS	944	45	44		11	1
14–15 Apr 2026	SW Research / Zero.pl	812	35.8	42.6	16.7	4.9	–6.8
10–12 Apr 2026	United Surveys / WP.pl	1,000	47.0	49.5		3.5	–2.5
27–28 Mar 2026	IBRiS / PAP	1,067	50	46		4	4
17–18 Mar 2026	SW Research / Wprost	811	39.1	38.6	18.1	4.1	0.5
11–16 Mar 2026	OGB	1,000	47.4	38.9	13.7		8.5
13–15 Mar 2026	United Surveys / WP.pl	1,000	47.1	49.8		3.1	–2.7
5–15 Mar 2026	CBOS	1,012	50	38		12	12
5–16 Feb 2026	CBOS	967	50	39		11	11
9–14 Feb 2026	OGB	1,000	48.82	36.36	14.82		12.46
10–11 Feb 2026	SW Research / Zero.pl	823	44.4	41.6		14.0	2.8
30 Jan – 1 Feb 2026	United Surveys / WP.pl (Note: Question wording: "How do you rate Karol Nawrocki after half a year as president of Poland?")	1,000	51.1	46.1		2.8	5.0
28 Jan 2026	SW Research / Onet (Note: Question wording: "Does Karol Nawrocki fulfill your expectations as president of Poland?")	800	41.8	41.4		16.8	0.4
8–20 Jan 2026	CBOS	938	50	39		12	11
12–19 Jan 2026	OGB	1,000	50.6	37.4	12.1		13.2
31 Dec 2025–1 Jan 2026	Pollster / "SE.pl" (Note: Question wording: "How do you rate half a year of Karol Nawrocki as president?")	1,002	55	45			10
9–15 Dec 2025	OGB	1,000	51.8	34.2	14.0		17.6
5–9 Dec 2025	Ipsos / Radio ZET (Note: Question wording: "How do you rate Karol Nawrocki as a politician?")	1,000	38	38	21	3	Tie
27 Nov – 8 Dec 2025	CBOS	948	51	34		15	17
25–28 Nov 2025	OGB	1,000	49.7	34.8	15.5		14.9
25–26 Nov 2025	UCE Research / Onet	1,021	46.8	30.1		23.1	16.7
15–17 Nov 2025	Pollster / "SE.pl"	1,003	49	39		12	10
6–17 Nov 2025	CBOS	992	50	33		17	17
14–16 Nov 2025	United Surveys / WP.pl	1,000	57.5	35.4		7.1	22.1
13–14 Nov 2025	Ariadna / WP.pl	1,050	50	34		16	16
7–8 Nov 2025	IBRiS / Rz	1,067	55.8	30.8		13.4	25.0
22–24 Oct 2025	Opinia24 / Polityka	1,001	53	26		21	27
8–13 Oct 2025	OGB	1,000	46.3	30.8	22.9		15.5
2–13 Oct 2025	CBOS	901	51	26		23	25
11–22 Sep 2025	CBOS	969	54	26		20	28
19–20 Sep 2025	IBRiS / Onet	1,100	51.6	38.0		10.4	13.6
13–15 Sep 2025	United Surveys / WP.pl	1,000	57.5	32.9		9.6	24.6
2–9 Sep 2025	OGB	1,000	47.5	33.2	19.3		14.3
2–3 Sep 2025	SW Research / Onet	830	42.9	32.2		24.9	10.7
28 Aug – 1 Sep 2025	United Surveys / WP.pl	1,000	45.2	44.8		10.0	0.4
21 Aug – 1 Sep 2025	CBOS	917	44	30		26	14
6–13 Aug 2025	OGB	1,000	41.7	32.7	25.6		9.0

=== Will Nawrocki be a good president? ===
Date(s) conducted	Polling firm/Link	Sample size	Good	Decent	Bad	Don't know/Neutral	Net approval
Jul 2026 (Note: Poll retrospectively asked whether respondents had good or bad expectations shortly after Nawrocki's inauguration)	Opinia24	1,000	48		34	18	14
21 Aug – 1 Sep 2025	CBOS	917	53		33	14	20
29–30 Jul 2025	SW Research / Rz	800	33.8	27.0	29.6	9.6	4.2

=== Will Nawrocki be/is Nawrocki a better president than Andrzej Duda? ===
Date(s) conducted	Polling firm/Link	Sample size	Yes	No	Don't know/Neutral	Net approval
15–17 Jul 2026	UCE Research / Onet	1,013	34.6	18.0	47.5 (Note: 37.1 — Don't know, 10.4 — the same)	16.6
26–27 Jan 2026	Pollster / "SE.pl"	1,010	31	22	47 (Note: 11 — Don't know, 36 — the same)	9
21 Aug – 1 Sep 2025	CBOS	917	49	27	24	22
13–16 Aug 2025	IBRiS / WP.pl	1,000	47.1	25.2	26.7	21.9

=== Other approval-related polls ===
A Pollster poll for Super Express conducted on 9–11 August 2025 found that 41% of Poles approved of Nawrocki's first decisions as president while 30% disapproved.

An IBRiS poll for Wirtualna Polska conducted on 13–16 August 2025 showed the fourth largest number of respondents — 10.5% — ranked Nawrocki as the most effective politician, with him falling behind Donald Tusk (PO) — 28.1%, Jarosław Kaczyński (PiS) — 23.5% and Sławomir Mentzen (KWiN) — 11.3%.

An SW Research poll for Rzeczpospolita conducted on 2–3 September 2025 asked to assign a school grade for Nawrocki's performance after a month of his presidency. From 1 (worst) to 6 (best), 21.9% of respondents gave Nawrocki a 1, 2 — 13.3% , 3 — 9.3%, 4 — 16.4%, 5 — 15.5%, 6 — 13.1%, with 10.5% undecided.

An Ariadna poll for Wirtualna Polska conducted on 17–20 October 2025 placed Nawrocki as the first most liked politician with 28% of respondents ranking him as their favorite, ahead of Rafał Trzaskowski (14%) and Donald Tusk (12%) and 8 others.

An SW Research poll for Zero.pl conducted on 14–15 April 2026 showed 41.0% of respondents rated Nawrocki as a good commander-in-chief of the Polish Armed Forces, whereas 41.1% rated him negatively in that role.

An Opinia24 conducted on 4–6 May 2026 showed that of the 43% of respondents who claimed to "value" a politician, Nawrocki was "valued" by 6% of respondents — behind Tusk with 9%, but ahead of Aleksander Kwaśniewski with 5%.

An Opinia24 conducted on 8–10 June 2026 found that 30% of respondents saw Nawrocki's domestic policies as rather good than bad, 29% thought they were rather bad than good, and 20% thought they were equally good and bad.

An SW Research poll for Dziennik Gazeta Prawna conducted a year after his inauguration found that 49% of Poles saw Nawrocki as "better than initially expected" or "as good as expected", while 37.7% were of the opposite opinion.

=== Politician of the year ===
A Pollster poll for Super Express conducted on 6–7 December 2025 found that 44% of respondents ranked Nawrocki as the "biggest political winner" of 2025, ahead of Donald Tusk with 12% and Radosław Sikorski with 6%. Nawrocki's presidential election opponent, Rafał Trzaskowski, was ranked as the year's "biggest political loser", with 37% ranking him as such (ahead of Zbigniew Ziobro with 20% and Szymon Hołownia with 19%).

A CBOS poll conducted on 27 November – 8 December 2025 found that 16% of respondents ranked Nawrocki as the "politician of the year", ahead of Donald Tusk and Radosław Sikorski (both with 8%).

A United Surveys poll for Wirtualna Polska conducted on 19–21 December 2025 asking who Poles considered the Person of the Year in Poland found that 26.6% of respondents ranked Nawrocki as Person of the Year, ahead of tennis player Iga Świątek (11.6%), astronaut Sławosz Uznański (11.0%) and Donald Tusk (9.3%). The same poll showed most respondents ranked him as the most influential politician of the year, with 34.7% ranking him as such, ahead of Tusk (29.1%) and Kaczyński (9.9%).

An SW Research poll for Rzeczpospolita conducted on 30–31 December 2025 found that 37.8% of respondents ranked Nawrocki as the biggest political winner of 2025, ahead of Donald Tusk (8.8%) and Radosław Sikorski (7.8%).

== Trust rating ==
Date(s) conducted	Polling firm/Link	Sample size	Trust	Distrust	Indifferent	Don't know/Neutral	Net trust	Place
23–24 Oct 2026	IBRiS / Onet	1,100	46.0	44.2	8.4	1.4	1.8	1st
1–11 Oct 2026	CBOS	1,028	53	34	9	3	19	1st
14–27 Sep 2026	CBOS	956	53	35	8	3	18	1st
19–20 Sep 2026	IBRiS / Onet	1,100	47.1	43.9	8.1	0.9	3.2	1st
20–30 Aug 2026	CBOS	935	51	36	10	3	15	1st
21–22 Aug 2026	IBRiS / Onet	1,100	50.2	44.8	4.8	0.2	5.4	1st
24–25 Jul 2026	IBRiS / Onet	1,100	51.3	41.6	7.1	0.0	9.7	1st
2–12 Jul 2026	CBOS	938	55	33	9	3	22	1st
26–28 Jun 2026	United Surveys / WP.pl	1,000	51.9	44.8		3.3	7.1	1st
19–21 Jun 2026	IBRiS / Onet	1,100	54.8	39.3	5.9	0.0	15.5	1st
11–21 Jun 2026	CBOS	991	53	34	9	4	19	1st
5–9 Jun 2026	Social Changes	1,073	—	—	—	—	—	1st
22–23 May 2026	IBRiS / Onet	1,100	46.4	42.8	10.8	0.0	3.6	1st
7–17 May 2026	CBOS	1,041	48	38	10	4	10	1st
24–25 Apr 2026	IBRiS / Onet	1,100	49.1	41.6	8.5	0.8	7.5	1st
9–19 Apr 2026	CBOS	944	49	38	8	4	11	1st
10–12 Apr 2026	UCE Research / Onet	1,015	35.9	39.0	20.9	4.2	–3.1	—
20–21 Mar 2026	IBRiS / Onet	1,100	46.3	46.7	5.0	2.0	–0.4	1st
5–15 Mar 2026	CBOS	1,012	52	35	10	3	17	1st
20–21 Feb 2026	IBRiS / Onet	1,100	48.8	42.8	8.0	0.4	6.0	1st
5–16 Feb 2026	CBOS	967	52	35	9	4	17	1st
20–21 Jan 2026	IBRiS / Onet	1,100	47.7	45.9	4.4	2.0	1.8	1st
8–20 Jan 2026	CBOS	938	52	35	9	5	17	1st
19–20 Dec 2025	IBRiS / Onet	1,100	49.3	41.7	9.0	0.0	7.6	1st
27 Nov – 8 Dec 2025	CBOS	948	54	33	9	5	21	1st
21–22 Nov 2025	IBRiS / Onet	1,100	51.8	41.9	6.3	0.0	9.9	1st
6–17 Nov 2025	CBOS	992	54	31	10	4	23	1st
24–25 Oct 2025	IBRiS / Onet	1,100	47.0	38.6	12.9	1.5	8.4	1st
2–12 Oct 2025	CBOS	901	57	26	11	6	31	1st
11–22 Sep 2025	CBOS	969	58	25	12	5	33	1st
19–20 Sep 2025	IBRiS / Onet	1,100	48.8	40.6	10.6	0.0	8.2	1st
21 Aug – 1 Sep 2025	CBOS	917	52	31	12	5	21	1st
20–21 Aug 2025	IBRiS / Onet	1,100	41.3	48.0	10.3	0.4	–6.7	2nd
25–27 Jul 2025	IBRiS / Onet	1,100	46.8	46.2	6.6	0.4	0.6	1st
3–13 Jul 2025	CBOS	970	48	36	9	6	12	2nd
23–24 Jun 2025	IBRiS / Onet	1,100	41.9	46.3	11.4	0.4	–4.4	2nd
5–15 Jun 2025	CBOS	971	46	36	12	6	10	3rd

A Social Changes poll conducted on 5–9 June 2026 found Karol Nawrocki to be the most trusted politician on a scale of 1 to 10, with his average rating being 4.2, ahead of Radosław Sikorski with 4.1 and Donald Tusk with 3.7.

== Legislative proposals and other initiatives ==
Date(s) conducted	Polling firm/Link	Sample size	Poll subject	Question	Support president / Oppose coalition / Support veto	Support coalition / Oppose president / Oppose veto	Neither	Don't know/Neutral	Lead
17–18 Nov 2026	SW Research / Onet	800	Presidential veto	[Do you support Karol Nawrocki's veto of Digital Services Act implementation in Poland?]	30.06	43.96	12.58	13.40	13.90
Oct 2026	SW Research / Wprost	1,000	Coalition proposal	How do you rate the president's decision to sign the law enforcing a windfall tax for fuel sales?	12.1	60.9		27.0	48.8
Sep 2026	SW Research / Wprost	1,000	Coalition proposal	Should President Karol Nawrocki sign the law enforcing a windfall tax for fuel sales?	12.7	63.2		13.6	50.5
18–20 Sep 2026	United Surveys / WP.pl	1,000	Coalition proposal	Should President Karol Nawrocki sign the law enforcing a windfall tax for fuel sales, the revenues out of which the government wants to subsidize fuel price decreases?	31.1	51.7		17.2	20.6
10–11 Sep 2026	United Surveys / WP.pl	1,000	Presidential veto	President Karol Nawrocki several times vetoed laws regulating the cryptocurrency market, which were prepared by the government coalition. Do you believe the president's decisions were justified?	41.6	45.8		12.6	4.2
2–3 Sep 2026	SW Research / Rz	800	Presidential initiative	Do you believe Poland should receive war reparations from Germany [for World War II]?	46.9	32.5		20.6	14.4
21–23 Aug 2026	United Surveys / WP.pl	1,000	Coalition proposal	[Do] you think President Karol Nawrocki [should sign] the proposed tax changes proposed by the government if they reach his table [or veto them]?	30.1	42.2	11.9 (Note: send to Constitutional Tribunal)	15.8	12.1
21–23 Aug 2026	United Surveys / WP.pl	1,000	Presidential veto	President Karol Nawrocki did not sign nor veto the law about fighting medical disinformation - he sent it to the Constitutional Tribunal, which means the law will not go into effect unless the Tribunal does not affirm its constitutionality. How do you rate the president's decision?	43.7	45.0		11.3	1.3
24–25 Jul 2026	United Surveys / WP.pl	1,000	Presidential veto	How do you rate the president's decision to veto the close person status law[...]?	34.5	54.8		10.7	20.3
2–3 Jun 2026	SW Research / Kampania Przeciw Homofobii	837	Coalition proposal	Do you think that president Karol Nawrocki should sign the close person status law?	14.3	47.8		37.9 (Note: 13.8 — no opinion, 24.1 — don't know this law)	33.5
29 May – 2 Jun 2026	IBRiS / Polsat News	1,000	Coalition proposal	Should president Karol Nawrocki sign or not sign the close person status law?	37.4	53.0		9.6	15.6
14–15 Apr 2026	SW Research / Zero.pl	812	Presidential veto	How do you rate president Karol Nawrocki's decision to veto the law regarding the SAFE mechanism?	36.3	43.3		20.4	7.0
14–15 Mar 2026	UCE Research / Onet	1,004	Presidential veto	How do you rate president Karol Nawrocki's decision to veto the law regarding the SAFE program?	34.46	40.34		25.20	5.88
13–15 Mar 2026	United Surveys / WP.pl	1,000	Presidential veto	President Karol Nawrocki vetoed the law introducing the EU debt program for defence and security (the so-called SAFE program). How do you rate the president's decision?	40.1	51.9		8.1	11.8
13–15 Mar 2026	IBRiS / Polsat News	1,000	Presidential veto	How do you rate Nawrocki's decision to veto the law regarding the SAFE program?	33.8	56.9			23.1
13–14 Mar 2026	IBRiS / Radio ZET	1,068	Presidential veto	Is president Karol Nawrocki's opposition to the EU SAFE loan consistent with the interests of Poland?	38.0	52.5		9.5	14.5
11–12 Mar 2026	Opinia24 / "Fakty" TVN, TVN24	1,002	Coalition proposal	Should the President sign the law regarding the SAFE program?	25	53		22	28
10–11 Mar 2026	Pollster / "SE.pl"	1,013	Coalition proposal	Should the President sign the law implementing the European SAFE program?	30	48		22	18
9 Mar 2026	IBRiS	1,000	Coalition proposal	Should president Karol Nawrocki sign the law regarding the accession of Poland into the SAFE program?	42	54		4	12
3–4 Mar 2026	SW Research / Rz	800	Presidential veto	If the president vetoes the law implementing the SAFE program, how would that impact your perception of his presidency?	19.5 (Note: My rating of his presidency would improve)	36.1 (Note: My rating of his presidency would worsen)	26.6 (Note: My rating of presidency would not change)	17.7	16.6
27 Feb – 1 Mar 2026	United Surveys / WP.pl	1,000	Coalition proposal	The law regarding the SAFE program will soon reach Karol Nawrocki's desk ... Should he sign this law?	30.8	54.6		14.6	23.8
25–26 Feb 2026	Pollster / "SE.pl"	988	Coalition proposal	Do you believe president Karol Nawrocki should sign the law regarding the SAFE program?	37	63			26
25 Feb 2026	SW Research / Onet	800	Presidential veto	Do you believe president Karol Nawrocki should veto the SAFE program?	34.6	38.2		27.1	3.6
19–20 Feb 2026	IPSOS / "19:30" TVP Info	1,000	Coalition proposal	Should president Karol Nawrocki sign the SAFE program into law?	27	38		35	11
17–18 Feb 2026	SW Research / Zero.pl	800	Coalition proposal	What should president Karol Nawrocki do with the law regarding the SAFE program? (sign into law/veto/send to Constitutional Tribunal)	20.4 (Note: veto)	31.0 (Note: sign into law)	15.3	33.3	10.6
13–14 Feb 2026	IBRiS / Rz	1,068	Coalition proposal	Should president Karol Nawrocki sign the act letting Poland join the SAFE program?	29.8	58.4		11.8	28.6
16–17 Jan 2026	IBRiS / Rz	1,067	Presidential proposal	After vetoing the "chaining law" (Law prohibiting chaining up dogs), President Karol Nawrocki submitted his own draft law on the matter. Should the Sejm begin work on the president's submitted draft law in this regard?	69.8	16.1		14.0	53.7
13–14 Jan 2026	SW Research / Rz	800	Presidential veto	Do you think that president Karol Nawrocki was right to veto the bill adopting EU's Digital Services Act into Polish law?	30.6	31.0		38.4 (Note: 19.6 — no opinion, 18.8 — don't know this law)	0.4
6–7 Jan 2026	SW Research / Rz	800	Coalition proposal	Do you believe president Karol Nawrocki should sign the close person status law?	14.8	47.4		37.8 (Note: 17.1 — no opinion, 20.7 — don't know this law)	32.6
9–10 Dec 2025	SW Research / Onet	813	Presidential veto	Do you support the veto of Karol Nawrocki regarding the so-called chaining law? (Law prohibiting chaining up dogs)	37.4	38.7		23.8	1.3
5–8 Dec 2025	United Surveys / WP.pl	1,000	Presidential veto	President Karol Nawrocki decided to veto the so-called chaining law, which would completely prohibit keeping dogs chained up. Do you support the president's decision to block these changes?	35.8	61.3		2.9	25.5
6–7 Dec 2025	Pollster / "SE.pl"	1,008	Presidential veto	(How do you rate the presidential veto regarding the law prohibiting chaining up dogs?) (Note: Question wording unknown)	44	56			12
3–5 Nov 2025	CBOS / DGP	1,000	Coalition proposal	(Do you support same-sex civil unions?)	35.1	62.1 (Note: 31.5 — with lesser rights than married couples, 30.6 — with the same rights as married couples)		2.7	27.0
28–29 Oct 2025	IPSOS / TVP Info	1,000	Coalition proposal	Should Karol Nawrocki sign the law about close person status, prepared by The Left and the Polish People's Party?	25	47		28	22
9–10 Sep 2025	SW Research / Onet	828	Presidential initiative	Do you support the efforts of president Karol Nawrocki in attaining World War II reparations from Germany?	54.0	26.8		19.2	27.2
2–3 Sep 2025	SW Research / Wprost	830	Presidential initiative	(Should Poland seek World War II reparations from Germany?)	55.2	25.4		19.4	29.4
26–27 Aug 2025	SW Research / Wprost	814	Presidential veto	How do you rate the presidential veto regarding the wind turbine bill?	38.6	38.2		23.2	0.4
26–27 Aug 2025	SW Research / Onet	814	Presidential veto	Do you support the decision of president Karol Nawrocki to veto the law about aiding the citizens of Ukraine?	59.8	25.4		14.7	34.4
26–27 Aug 2025	SW Research / Onet	814	Presidential veto	Do you support the decision of president Karol Nawrocki to veto the wind turbine law, despite it including a provision regarding freezing energy prices?	36.4	39.1		24.6	2.7
13–14 Aug 2025	IBRiS / Rz	1,067	Coalition proposal	Should the president sign the law liberalizing the rules of investing in wind turbines, which simultaneously extends the price freeze period on energy for households until the end of the year?	33.9	55.8		10.3	21.9
13–14 Aug 2025	IBRiS / Rz	1,067	Presidential proposal	Do you agree with the proposition of president Karol Nawrocki, that a parent with two children, whose annual income does not cross 140,000 PLN, should not pay income tax?	47.5	47.9		4.6	0.4

=== Presidential referendums ===
Date(s) conducted	Polling firm/Link	Sample size	Poll subject	Question	Yes	No	Neither	Don't know/Neutral
Jul 2026	SW Research / Wprost		EU climate referendum	"Are you in favor of the [EU] climate policy, that would lead to increased cost of living, energy prices, and cost of economic and agricultural activities?" [How would you vote in the referendum?]	28.5	33.9	16.9 (Note: Would not vote)	20.7
8–9 May 2026	IBRiS / Rz		EU climate referendum	[Do you believe the referendum question is a loaded question?]	57.9	37.4		4.8
8–10 May 2026	United Surveys / WP.pl	1,000	EU climate referendum	President Karol Nawrocki is issuing a referendum regarding the EU's climate policies. Would you vote in the referendum?	47.0	49.1		3.9
8–10 May 2026	United Surveys / WP.pl	1,000	EU climate referendum	"Are you in favor of the [EU] climate policy, that would lead to increased cost of living, energy prices, and cost of economic and agricultural activities?" How would you answer the basic question of the referendum?	22.2	74.1		3.7
8–10 May 2026	United Surveys / WP.pl	1,000	EU climate referendum	Do you believe a referendum regarding climate policy is necessary?	40.8	52.7		6.5

=== Welfare for Ukrainian refugees ===
Date(s) conducted	Polling firm/Link	Sample size	Question	Only Ukrainians working in Poland	All Ukrainians	No Ukrainians	Neither/ Other option	Don't know/Neutral
11–22 Sep 2025	CBOS	969	Do you believe that currently, [Ukrainians] should have access to [free 800+ and healthcare?]	58		8	25 (Note: Only refugees)	
2–3 Sep 2025	SW Research / Wprost	830	Should 800+ only be given to only Ukrainians which work in Poland?	56.4	18.0	19.6		6.0
30 Aug – 1 Sep 2025	Pollster / "SE.pl"	1,000	Should Ukrainians living in Poland receive 800+ for children?	54	11	29		6
28 Aug – 1 Sep 2025	United Surveys / WP.pl	1,000	[should] Payouts of benefits for foreigners such as 800+ in Poland, including Ukrainians, be dedicated to only those that are employed[?]	69.9			21.8	8.3

=== Other legislative proposal and referendums-related polls ===
An SW Research poll for Rzeczpospolita conducted on 26–27 August 2025 found that if an energy price freeze period extension failed to pass before its expiration, 31.8% would blame Nawrocki for energy price rises, 31.6% would blame Tusk's government and 26.8% would blame both.

An IBRiS poll for Radio ZET conducted on 8–9 May 2026 regarding Nawrocki's proposed climate policy referendum found that 39.2% found the referendum question an important matter, and 53.8% found it instead an element of a political game.

An SW Research poll for Rzeczpospolita conducted on 28–29 July 2026 found that 36.0% of Poles found Nawrocki responsible for high gas prices due to blocking a gas windfall tax, while 23.9% thought otherwise.

An SW Research poll for Rzeczpospolita conducted on 8–9 September 2026 found that 51.8% of Poles wanted the President and government to come to a compromise project for cryptocurrency regulation, 15.6% wanted Nawrocki to agree to the government project and 14.1% wanted the government to submit to Nawrocki's project.

== Judicial affairs ==
An SW Research poll for Onet conducted on 4–5 November 2025 found that 45.9% of respondents believed that the president should have the right to pardon, and 35.9% believed otherwise. In an UCE Research poll for Onet conducted on 4–6 February 2026 asking the same question, 57.4% of Poles believed that the president of Poland should have the right to pardon, whereas 26.0% believed otherwise.

An Ariadna poll for Wirtualna Polska conducted on 13–14 November 2025 found that 39% of Poles believed that the president has a deciding role in the process of judicial nominations, whereas 36% believed otherwise.

A United Surveys poll for Wirtualna Polska conducted on 14–16 November 2025 found that 84.6% of Poles believed that Nawrocki and prime Minister Donald Tusk should seek an agreement in the matter of judicial reforms as soon as possible, whereas 5.6% believed otherwise. A similar poll by SW Research for Rzeczpospolita conducted on 24–25 February 2026 found that 70.9% of respondents believed that Nawrocki, the government and the opposition should find a compromise solution to the judicial crisis in Poland, with 7.3% disagreeing.

An IBRiS poll for Rzeczpospolita conducted on 16–17 October 2026 found that, regarding the dispute over the Constitutional Tribunal, 32.7% of respondents believed that neither Nawrocki nor Tusk was right, 32.0% believed Nawrocki was right and 27.8% believed Tusk was right.

=== Judicial inaugurations ===
In November 2025, Nawrocki rejected the nomination of 46 judges. In an SW Research poll for Rzeczpospolita (12–13 Nov), 30.9% respondents also agreed with Nawrocki's decision, and 39.4% disagreed. In an Ariadna poll for Wirtualna Polska (13–14 Nov), 37% agreed and 35% disagreed. In a United Surveys poll also for Wirtualna Polska (14–16 Nov), 38.0% agreed while 42.5% disagreed. In a Pollster poll (15–17 Nov), 35% agreed and 40% disagreed.

In 2026, the Sejm selected six new judges to the Constitutional Tribunal. An SW Research poll for Rzeczpospolita conducted on 17–18 March 2026 found that 50.4% of Poles believed Nawrocki should inaugurate the judges, whereas 22.1% believed he should not. A United Surveys poll for Wirtualna Polska found that 39.8% of respondents believed Nawrocki should inaugurate the judges, 25.8% believed he should wait until any related legal doubts are resolved, and 14.2% believed he should reject inaugurating the judges.

Ultimately, Nawrocki inaugurated only two of the six judges, and later the Sejm itself unprecedentedly inaugurated the other four. An IBRiS poll for Rzeczpospolita conducted on 10–11 April 2026 found that 34.4% of respondents blamed Nawrocki for the escalation of the Constitutional Tribunal conflict, 23.3% blamed the government, 3.5% blamed the Tribunal chairman, 2.8% blamed the new judges and 25.3% blamed everyone equally. According to a United Surveys poll for Wirtualna Polska conducted on 10–12 April 2026, 43.9% of Poles supported the decision of the Sejm to inaugurate the four remaining judges, while 42.2% did not. The same poll found that 56.6% of respondents wanted Nawrocki to inaugurated the remaining four judges, while 26.2% did not. An SW Research poll for Zero.pl conducted on 14–15 April 2026 found that 30.4% of respondents agreed with Nawrocki's decision to inaugurate only two of the judges, and 47.3% disagreed.

A United Surveys poll for Wirtualna Polska conducted on 16–18 October 2026 found that 40.0% of respondents positively rated Nawrocki's refusal to accept the oath from five judges of the Constitutional Tribunal elected by the Sejm, while 50.4% rated it negatively and 9.6% had no opinion.

== Foreign policy ==
=== Foreign policy approval rating ===
Date(s) conducted	Polling firm/Link	Sample size	Question	Good or Yes or Approve	Bad or No or Disapprove	Neither	Don't know/Neutral	Net approval
7–8 Aug 2026	Pollster / "SE.pl"	803	How do you think Karol Nawrocki represents Poland on the international arena?	56	44			12
5 Aug 2026	SW Research / Onet	803	How do you rate the method Nawrocki represents Poland on the international arena?	47.0	34.9		18.1	12.1
8–10 Jun 2026	Opinia24	1,000	[How do you rate Nawrocki's first year in foreign policy]?	30	28	19	24	2
29 Apr 2026	SW Research / Onet	821	How do you rate Karol Nawrocki's actions on the international arena?	39.6	41.2		19.2	–1.6
14–15 Apr 2026	SW Research / Zero.pl	812	How do you believe president Nawrocki represents Poland on the international arena?	43.7	43.4		12.9	0.3
24–28 Jan 2026	IBRiS / Onet	1,000	How do you rate Karol Nawrocki's actions on the international arena?	54.4	37.5		8.2	16.9
25–26 Nov 2025	UCE Research / Onet	1,021	Do you believe Karol Nawrocki represents Poland well on the international arena?	55.5	32.3		12.2	23.2

=== Who should be responsible for contacts with the Trump administration? ===
Date(s) conducted	Polling firm/Link	Sample size	President Karol Nawrocki	MFA Radosław Sikorski	PM Donald Tusk	Don't know/Neutral	Lead
29–30 Aug 2025	IBRiS / Rz	1,069	49.8	—	32.2	18.0	17.6
20–21 Aug 2025	United Surveys / WP.pl	1,000	37.9	39.6	9.8	12.7	1.7

=== Whose actions in foreign affairs bring Poland more benefits? ===
Date(s) conducted	Polling firm/Link	Sample size	President Karol Nawrocki	Government	Both	Neither	Don't know/Neutral
9–10 Sep 2025	IBRiS / Onet	1,067	31.4	27.9	16.1	11.3	13.2

=== Other foreign policy-related polls ===
According to an SW Research poll for Rzeczpospolita conducted on 19–20 August 2025, 24.9% of respondents believed Nawrocki and his chancellery to be responsible for the lack of a Polish delegation at the August 2025 European-White House crisis meeting, 23.7% found Prime Minister Donald Tusk and his government responsible, 25.5% found both sides responsible, 11.2% found no one responsible and 14.7% had no opinion.

A United Surveys poll for Wirtualna Polska conducted on 10–13 October 2025 showed that 27.4% of Poles believed Nawrocki will have good relations with the president of Ukraine, Volodymyr Zelenskyy, while 56.3% believed they will not. Another United Surveys poll for Wirtualna Polska conducted on 14–16 November 2025 showed that 51.6% of Poles wanted Zelenskyy to have his first visit with Nawrocki in Poland, whereas 8.8% wanted their first meeting to take place in Ukraine. 16.2% had no preference and 11.1% believed no visit between the two to be necessary.

An IBRiS poll for Rzeczpospolita found that 87.1% of Poles agreed that president Nawrocki and prime minister Tusk should cooperate in regards to foreign policy, whereas 6.7% disagreed.

An SW Research poll for Wprost conducted on 27–28 January 2026 regarding the presidential non-approval of ambassadors nominated by the Tusk cabinet found that 36.4% of respondents blamed the impasse on Nawrocki, 24.8% on foreign minister Sikorski and 19.7% found both sides responsible.

A United Surveys poll for Wirtualna Polska conducted on 27 February–1 March 2026 asking who best defends Poland's interests on the international stage showed Nawrocki selected by 38.8% of respondents, Radosław Sikorski with 26.9% and Tusk with 16.3%, whereas 13.4% believed none adequately defended Poland's interests abroad.

An SW Research poll for Zero.pl conducted on 14–15 April 2026 found that 32.8% rated Nawrocki's decision to reject the government's ambassadorial nominations positively, and 42.9% rated his decision negatively.

A United Surveys poll for Wirtualna Polska conducted on 24–26 April 2026 showed that 55.6% of Poles wanted Nawrocki to arrive at the 2026 G20 Miami summit regardless of Vladimir Putin's presence, while 33.9% thought Nawrocki should resign from participating. An SW Research poll for Rzeczpospolita conducted on 2–3 October 2026 found that 29.7% of respondents Nawrocki to meet with Vladimir Putin, while 63.5% did not.

In May 2026, Donald Trump announced the deployment of 5,000 more American soldiers to Poland. An SW Research poll for Rzeczpospolita conducted on 16–27 May 2026 found that 27.1% of respondents was a success of Nawrocki, 10.0% found it a success of Tusk's government, 16.4% found it a success of both Nawrocki and Tusk, and 33.6% thought it was nobody's success as Poland does not influence US decisionmaking. A United Surveys poll for Wirtualna Polska conducted on 2–4 October 2026 found that, regarding Nawrocki's proposal to name the planned permanent US base in Poland "Fort Trump", 13.4% of respondents supported the base and the name, 35.6% supported the base but believed it should have a different name and 39.6% supported the base and considered the name irrelevant. 7.0% did not support the base and 4.4% had no opinion.

A Pollster poll for Super Express conducted on 6–7 October 2026 found that, when asked who works better for Poland's cooperation with the United States, 38% of respondents believed Nawrocki did, while 19% believed the government (Tusk, Władysław Kosiniak-Kamysz and the other ministers) did. 13% believed both sides worked equally well, 11% believed both worked equally badly and 19% had no opinion.

=== Stripping Zelenskyy of the Order of the White Eagle ===
In May 2026, Ukrainian president Vladimir Zelenskyy honored a military unit of the Armed Forces of Ukraine with the title "Heroes of the Ukrainian Insurgent Army", a Nazi-collaborating organization that conducted a genocide against Poles in Volhynia. After this incident, Karol Nawrocki decided to strip the Ukrainian president of the Order of the White Eagle.

Support for Nawrocki's decision to stop Zelenskyy of the Order of the White Eagle
Date(s) conducted	Polling firm/Link	Sample size	Support	Oppose	Don't know/Neutral	Net
13–15 July 2026	Opinia24 / Polityka	1,000	55	27	18	28
2–12 July 2026	CBOS	938	59	28	13	31
4–14 June 2026	United Surveys / WP.pl	1,000	51.2	35.5	13.3	15.7
June 2026	Pollster / "SE.pl"		52	24	24	28
June 2026	SW Research / Wprost		52.3	22.4	25.3	29.9

A United Surveys poll for Wirtualna Polska conducted on 12–14 June 2026 showed that the majority of Poles, 58.3%, believed Zelenskyy to be hostile towards Poland, while 30.1% believed otherwise. An SW Research poll for Onet conducted on 24 June found that 50.6% of respondents also wanted Prime Minister Donald Tusk to allow the revocation of the order, while 28.4% were against. Another Pollster poll for Super Express showed that 72% of respondents wanted Zelenskyy to apologize for the incident, while 11% thought otherwise. A 24 June SW Research poll showed that 36.4% believed the revocation would strengthen Poland's international position, while 31.6% thought Poland's position would be weakened. A 1 July SW Research poll for Onet showed that 42.5% considered themselves closer to Nawrocki's stances towards Ukraine, while 32.5% were closer to the government's stances. An SW Research poll for Wirtualna Polska conducted on 26–28 June found that 56% blamed Zelenskyy for escalation of the conflict, 19.7% blamed Nawrocki and 20.0% blamed both sides equally. Another SW Research poll for Rzeczpospolita conducted on 30 June – 1 July found that 46.6% of respondents believed Ukraine was the country escalating the conflict, 12.7% believed Poland to be responsible and 25.4% believed both sides to be responsible. A CBOS poll conducted on 2–12 July found that 41% of respondents thought the revocation would bring more benefits than losses to Poland, while 41% disagreed. An Opinia24 poll for Polityka conducted on 13–15 July 2026 found that due to the honoring of the Ukrainian Insurgent Army by Zelenskyy, 44% of Poles wanted to halt aid to Ukraine, while 41% wanted its continuation.

== Constitutional reform ==
Date(s) conducted	Polling firm/Link	Sample size	Issue	For	Against	Don't know/Neutral
4–6 Sep 2026	United Surveys / WP.pl	1,000	Weakening veto power	38.2	49.6	12.2
9–10 May 2026	UCE Research / Onet	1,037	Referendum attendnace intent	70.1	16.4	13.5
9–10 May 2026	UCE Research / Onet	1,037	General constitutional reform	42.3	36.0	21.7
8–9 May 2026	IBRiS / Rz	1,067	General constitutional reform	41.5	50.7	7.8
6 May 2026	SW Research / Onet (Note: Question wording: "Should Poland have a presidential or [the currently existing] parliamentary system?")	835	Presidential system	29.3	44.0	26.7
5–6 May 2026	Pollster / "SE.pl"	1,024	General constitutional reform	37	42	21
5–6 May 2026	SW Research / Rz	800	General constitutional reform	43.9	39.6	16.5
21–22 Apr 2026	SW Research / Rz	800	Presidential system	29.8	47.7	22.5

=== Presidential powers ===
Date(s) conducted	Polling firm/Link	Sample size				
Date(s) conducted	Polling firm/Link	Sample size	Presidential powers should be...			
Date(s) conducted	Polling firm/Link	Sample size	empowered	the same	disempowered	Don't know/Neutral
8–10 May 2026	United Surveys / WP.pl	1,000	34.8	58.2 (Note: Against empowering presidency in general)		7.0
5–6 May 2026	SW Research / Rz	800	27.5	35.8	27.0	9.6
14–15 Apr 2026	SW Research / Zero.pl	812	24.0	30.2	28.3	17.5
22–24 Oct 2025	Opinia24 / Polityka	1,001	31	39	16	14
1–3 Sep 2025	Opinia24	1,003	30	36	16	18
29–30 Aug 2025	IBRiS / Rz	1,069	31.0	57.7		11.3

=== Other constitutional reform polls ===
An UCE Research poll for Onet conducted on 9–10 May 2026 found that 46.3% of respondents believed constitutional reforms would largely benefit politicians rather than citizens, whereas 29.2% believed otherwise. The same poll found that 68.8% of Poles thought any constitutional changes should be ratified in a referendum, while 15.6% thought otherwise.

After Nawrocki established a presidential council for constitutional reform, a United Surveys poll for Wirtualna Polska conducted on 8–10 May 2026 found that 33% of Poles suppored Nawrocki's decision to establish the council, whereas 60.2% opposed it.

== Polls regarding the First Lady ==
=== First Lady approval polling ===
Date(s) conducted	Polling firm/Link	Sample size	Approve	Disapprove	Don't know/Neutral	Net approval
21–22 Sep 2026	Pollster / "SE.pl"	1,029	47	15	38 (Note: 12 — Don't know, 26 — neither good or bad)	32
7–8 Aug 2026	Pollster / "SE.pl"	1,022	64	36		28
24–25 July 2026	United Surveys / WP.pl	1,000	50.4	18.9	30.7	31.5
2–3 June 2026	SW Research / Wprost	837	48.0	25.6	26.5	22.4
28–29 May 2026	United Surveys / WP.pl	1,000	58.8	23.0	18.2	35.8
10–12 Apr 2026	United Surveys / WP.pl	1,000	50.5	31.0	18.5	19.5
17–18 Feb 2026	SW Research / Wprost	800	49.9	27.2	22.9	22.7
31 Jan – 1 Feb 2026	United Surveys / WP.pl	1,000	55.2	14.9	29.9	40.3
31 Dec 2025–1 Jan 2026	Pollster / "SE.pl"	1,002	44	20	36	24
13–14 Nov 2025	Ariadna / WP.pl	1,050	54	15	31	39
17–20 Oct 2025	Ariadna / WP.pl	1,088	47	16	37	31
11–12 Oct 2025	Pollster / "SE.pl"	1,002	46	16	38	30

=== First Lady comparisons ===
Date(s) conducted	Polling firm/Link	Sample size	Question	Marta Nawrocka	Agata Kornhauser-Duda	Anna Komorowska	Maria Kaczyńska	Jolanta Kwaśniewska	Danuta Wałęsa	Don't know/Neutral/Other
24–25 Jul 2026	United Surveys / WP.pl	1,000	Who do you believe was the best First Lady of Poland since 1989?	8.4	2.4	0.0	11.3	60.5	1.8	15.6 (Note: 9.6 — Don't know, 6.0 — none of the above)
18 Feb 2026	SW Research / Onet	800	Which First Lady do you rate the best?	16.7	4.8	2.6	10.6	45.3	4.2	15.7
31 Dec 2025–1 Jan 2026	Pollster / "SE.pl"	1,002	Which First Lady do you believe served their role better?	27	7	—	—	—	—	66 (Note: 28 — Don't know, 38 — the same)
9–10 Dec 2025	SW Research / Onet	813	How is Marta Nawrocka doing as First Lady compared to Agata Kornhauser-Duda?	40.0	9.1	—	—	—	—	50.9 (Note: 21.4 — Don't know, 29.5 — the same)
13–14 Nov 2025	Ariadna / WP.pl	1,050	Who best served as the best First Lady of the Poland?	18	8	3	12	55	4	
17–20 Oct 2025	Ariadna / WP.pl	1,088	Do you believe that Marta Nawrocka is a better First Lady than Agata Kornhauser-Duda?	37	12	—	—	—	—	51
13–16 Aug 2025	United Surveys / WP.pl	1,000	Who do you rate as the best First Lady of the Third Polish Republic?	5.3	8.1	0.0	17.5	57.8	0.6	10.7

=== Other First Lady-related polls ===
An IBRiS poll for Radio Zet conducted on 24–25 October 2025 found that 52.8% of Poles believed that the First Lady should receive a monthly wage, while 33.9% believed otherwise. A Pollster poll for Super Express from April 2026 found Poles split with 49% supporting a wage and 51% opposing it.

== Veto power ==
=== What do you believe drives Nawrocki's vetoes? ===
Date(s) conducted	Polling firm/Link	Sample size	Question	Citizens' interest, merit, etc.	Political interest, obsturctionism, etc.	Don't know/Neutral
24–25 July 2026	SW Research / WP.pl	1,000	President Karol Nawrocki regularly uses his veto power against [the coalition's laws. Do you think they are driven by merit or political interest?]	39.9	52.8	7.3
27–30 Apr 2026	Opinia 24 / "GW"	1,002	When vetoing laws, do you believe president Nawrocki acts in the interests of:	40	42	18
13–15 Feb 2026	United Surveys / WP.pl	1,000	President Karol Nawrocki recently vetoed several laws. Which of the following opinions best reflects your views on this topic?	37.8	47.5	14.7
16–18 Jan 2026	United Surveys / WP.pl	1,000	Taking into account the last vetoes by Karol Nawrocki, what do you believe he was driven by?	36.7	56.9	6.4
5–8 Dec 2025	United Surveys / WP.pl	1,000	How do you rate Karol Nawrocki's usage of vetoes against the government's laws? They come mainly from...	46.7	50.0	3.3

=== Veto frequency ===
Date(s) conducted	Polling firm/Link	Sample size	Question	Too frequently/Overusage	Frequently enough/Correct usage	Too infrequently/Underusage	Don't know/Neutral
17–18 Mar 2026	SW Sesearch / Rz	800	How do you rate president Karol Nawrocki's usage of veto power?	46.9	33.4	5.1	14.6
23–26 Feb 2026	CBOS	1,000	Do you believe president Karol Nawrocki uses veto power (too frequently/frequently enough/too infrequently)	38	38	16	8
9–10 Dec 2026	SW Sesearch / Rz	800	How do you rate president Karol Nawrocki's usage of veto power?	44.1	39.6	3.4	12.9

== Other polls ==
=== Will Nawrocki be/is Nawrocki an independent president? ===
Date(s) conducted	Polling firm/Link	Sample size	Yes	No	Neither	Don't know/Neutral	Lead
25–26 Nov 2025	UCE Research / Onet	1,021	38.9	46.3		14.8	7.4
13–14 Nov 2025	Ariadna / WP.pl	1,050	32	46		22	14
9–10 Sep 2025	IBRiS / Onet	1,067	38.0	52.6		9.4	14.6
13–16 Aug 2025	United Surveys / WP.pl	1,000	38.8	57.6		3.6	18.8
9–11 Aug 2025	Pollster / "SE.pl"	1,006	34	54		12	20
4–6 Aug 2025	Opinia24 / RMF FM	1,003	28	44	14	14	16

=== Political leadership comparison ===
Date(s) conducted	Polling firm/Link	Sample size	Question	Karol Nawrocki	Jarosław Kaczyński	Mateusz Morawiecki	KWiN/KKP politicians	Neither/Other option	Don't know/Neutral
17–18 Nov 2026	SW Research / Rz	1,000	Who do you believe to be the leader of the right-wing in Poland?	23.8	19.0	4.0	19.0 (Note: 7.3 — Krzysztof Bosak, 6.7 — Sławomir Mentzen, 5.0 — Grzegorz Braun)	0.7	33.5
21–22 Sep 2026	Pollster / "SE.pl"	1,029 (Right-wing (Note: Opposition parties: PiS, R+, KWiN, KKP) voters)	Which right-wing politician best represents your interests?	41	8	8	27 (Note: 15 — Sławomir Mentzen, 12 — Grzegorz Braun)	6	10
21–22 Sep 2026	Pollster / "SE.pl"		Who is the leader of the Polish right-wing?	26	55	7	10 (Note: 5 — Sławomir Mentzen, 5 — Grzegorz Braun)	2	
7–9 Sep 2026	United Surveys / WP.pl	1,000	Do you believe that Karol Nawrocki has the necessary predispositions, charisma and abilities to [possibly] become the main leader of the Polish right in the future?	54.4 (Note: belief that Nawrocki will/could lead the Polish right)				28.8 (Note: lack of belief that Nawrocki will/could lead the Polish right)	
24–25 Jul 2026	United Surveys / WP.pl	1,000	Who is currently the true leader of the right-wing camp in Poland?	20.4	19.8	9.1	6.2 (Note: 4.5 — Sławomir Mentzen, 1.7 — Krzysztof Bosak)	34.7 (Note: 32.1 — "The right-wing currently has no leader", 2.6 — Przemysław Czarnek)	9.8
24–25 Jul 2026	Pollster / "SE.pl"	1,013	Who will be the leader of the Polish right following the split in PiS?	18	20	9	10 (Note: 7 — Sławomir Mentzen, 3 — Grzegorz Braun)	1	42
2–3 Jun 2026	SW Research / Rz	800	Who do you believe is the leader of the Polish right?	19.0	19.7		17.2 (Note: 7.0 — Sławomir Mentzen, 5.4 — Grzegorz Braun, 4.8 — Krzysztof Bosak)	6.1 (Note: 2.5 — Other, 3.6 — Przemysław Czarnek)	37.9
28–29 May 2026	Pollster / "SE.pl"	1,057	Who do you believe is the leader of the Polish right?	19	38	4	9 (Note: 5 — Grzegorz Braun, 4 — Sławomir Mentzen)	1	29
31 Dec 2025–1 Jan 2026	Pollster / "SE.pl"	1,002	Who is the leader of the Polish right?	41	41		16 (Note: 9 — Grzegorz Braun, 7 — Sławomir Mentzen)	2	
16–17 Dec 2025	SW Research / Rz	800	Who do you believe is currently the leader of the Polish right?	28.9	19.0		20.0 (Note: 9.1 — Sławomir Mentzen, 6.2 — Grzegorz Braun, 4.7 — Krzysztof Bosak)	2.4	29.5
15–17 Nov 2025	Pollster / "SE.pl"	1,003	Do you believe that Karol Nawrocki has a chance to become the main leader of the Polish right?	58				42	
22–24 Oct 2025	Opinia24 / Polityka	1,001	Do you believe that Karol Nawrocki will replace Jarosław Kaczyński as the leader of the entire Polish right?	21	50				29
9–10 Sep 2025	SW Research / Onet	828	Who do you believe is the true leader of the Law and Justice camp today?	22.6	50.8			12.7	13.9

=== Matchups between Nawrocki and Tusk ===
Date(s) conducted	Polling firm/Link	Sample size	Question	President Karol Nawrocki	PM Donald Tusk	Neither	Don't know/Neutral	Lead
14–16 Oct 2026	IBRiS / Polsat News	1,000	Currently, on many fields, a dispute is happening between the President and Prime Minister. Who do you believe is right in this dispute?	34.3	34.9	24.3	6.6	0.6
6–7 Oct 2026	SW Research / Onet	820	Who do you believe is the victor in the conflict regarding fuel prices: Karol Nawrocki or Donald Tusk?	36.0	34.8		29.1	1.2
13–15 Mar 2026	United Surveys / WP.pl	1,000	In the current political situation, who do you have more trust for: president Karol Nawrocki or prime minister Donald Tusk?	41.5	37.1	18.1 (Note: 16.9 — Neither of them, 1.2 — Both equally well)	3.3	4.4
23–26 Feb 2026	CBOS	1,000	Who do you trust more to represent the interests of the country?	41	29 (Note: government)	29 (Note: 17 — Neither of them, 12 — Both equally well)	1	12
13–15 Feb 2026	United Surveys / WP.pl	1,000	Who in the current situation better serves in their office and cares for Polish interest?	44.6	41.3	10.9 (Note: 6.7 — Neither of them, 4.2 — Both do equally well)	3.2	3.3
2–4 Jan 2026	United Surveys / WP.pl	1,000	Taking into account their activities so far, who do you rate higher in their function — prime minister Donald Tusk or president Karol Nawrocki?	42.3	42.0	12.8 (Note: 8.9 — Rate both badly, 3.9 — Rate both well)	2.9	1.3
21–23 Nov 2025	United Surveys / WP.pl	1,000	Which of these politicians do you trust more?	40.6	35.3	18.2	5.9	5.3
24–26 Oct 2025	United Surveys / WP.pl	1,000	Who is a better politician — Karol Nawrocki or Donald Tusk?	44.9	49.4		5.7	4.5
30 Aug – 1 Sep 2025	Pollster / "SE.pl"	1,000	Who is winning the political battle between the president and prime minister?	42	22	20	16	20

=== Cooperation between Nawrocki and Tusk ===
Date(s) conducted	Polling firm/Link	Sample size	Question	Good or Yes or Approve	Bad or No or Disapprove	Don't know/Neutral
29–30 Sep 2026	SW Research / Onet	800	Does conflict between the government and president hamper Poland in effectively reacting to security threats?	64.7	18.5	16.8
18–20 Sep 2026	United Surveys / WP.pl	1,000	How do you believe the conflict between the president and government influences Polish security? [Yes=harms, no=does not harm]	86.5	3.1	10.4 (Note: 3.6 — Don't know, 6.8 — no influence)
3–5 Aug 2026	Opinia24 / RMF FM	1,001	What influence do you believe does the current relationship between the government and president have on the security of Poland?	13	51	36 (Note: 18 — Don't know, 18 — no influence)
27–28 Mar 2026	IBRiS / Radio ZET	1,067	How do you rate the cooperation between the president and the government?	6.1	86.9	7.0
24–25 Mar 2026	SW Research / Zero.pl	811	How do you rate the cooperation between the president and the government?	20.2	59.8	20.0
25–26 Feb 2026	Pollster / "SE.pl"	988	How do you rate the cooperation between President and Prime Minister?	12	77	11
23–26 Feb 2026	CBOS	1,000	How do you rate the cooperation between president Karol Nawrocki and the government so far?	28	63	9
Dec 2025	Opinia24 / "Fakty" TVN, TVN24	1,000	There is an ongoing dispute between Donald Tusk and Karol Nawrocki. Do you believe this dispute is good or bad for Poland?	16	72	12
19–21 Dec 2025	United Surveys / WP.pl	1,000	How do you assess the relations between the Tusk's government and Karol Nawrocki in the coming year?	10.6	84.8	4.6
7–11 Dec 2025	IBRiS / Polsat News	1,000	Cooperation between the Prime Minister and President is (good/bad)?	1.1	92.5	6.4
5–8 Dec 2025	United Surveys / WP.pl	1,000	Do you believe that the conflict between Tusk and Nawrocki leads to a paralysis of the state and make it impossible to introduce necessary reforms?	76	18.9	5.1
13–14 Nov 2025	Ariadna / WP.pl	1,050	How do you rate the cooperation between Nawrocki and Tusk?	19	56	25
11–12 Oct 2025	Pollster / "SE.pl"	1,002	How do you rate the cooperation between Nawrocki and Tusk?	20	80	

=== Responsibility for president-government conflict ===
Date(s) conducted	Polling firm/Link	Sample size	Question	President Karol Nawrocki	PM Donald Tusk	Other option	Don't know/Neutral
5–6 May 2026	SW Research / Wprost	835	Who is primarily responsible for the depth of the political conflict in Poland?	30.7	22.9	30.8 (Note: 11.6 — Tusk's government, 10.9 — The opposition, 4.3 — Others (mostly "everyone"). 4.0 percent of respondents disagreed about the depth of the political conflict.)	15.7
14–15 Apr 2026	SW Research / Zero.pl	812	Who is more responsible for the conflict between the president and the government?	35.1	29.1	23.7 (Note: Both equally)	12.1
Dec 2025	Opinia 24 / "Fakty" TVN, TVN24	1,000	Who is more responsible for [the conflict between the president and the government]?	30	32	28	10

=== Should the Prime Minister consult legislation with Nawrocki? ===
Date(s) conducted	Polling firm/Link	Sample size	Yes	No	Don't know/Neutral	Lead
15–17 Nov 2025	Pollster / "SE.pl"	1,003	60	30	10	30
22–24 Oct 2025	Opinia24 / Polityka	1,001	58	25	17	33

=== Other ungrouped polls ===
A United Surveys poll for Wirtualna Polska conducted on 13–16 August 2025 found that 37.5% of Poles believed Nawrocki would fulfill his electoral campaign promises, while 50.7% believed otherwise.

An Opinia24 poll for RMF FM conducted on 1–3 September 2025 found that 23% of Poles believed Donald Tusk should stand down in the conflict between the president and government, 21% believed Nawrocki should stand down, and 38% believed both should compromise.

An SW Research poll for Rzeczpospolita conducted on 14–15 October 2025 found that 51.6% of Poles believed that Nawrocki could help relations between Law and Justice and Confederation, and 22.4% believed he could not.

An IBRiS poll for Rzeczpospolita conducted on 10–11 October 2025 found 33.2% of Poles (14.7% strongly, 18.5% rather) believed there should be a "presidential" political party under the patronage of Nawrocki, and 45.0% believed otherwise.

An Opinia24 poll for Polityka conducted on 24–26 October 2025 found that 7% believed Nawrocki will end the political conflict in Poland, 14% believed he will lighten the conflict, 31% believed there will be no changes and 25% believed he will intensify the conflict.

An SW Research poll for Onet conducted on 12–13 November 2025 found that 48.8% of Poles rated Nawrocki's appearance at the 2025 Independence March positively, while 30.7% rated it negatively.

An IBRiS poll for Onet conducted on 5–6 December 2025 found that 47.9% of respondents believed Nawrocki was sufficiently engaged in matters important to Poles, while 46.1% believed otherwise.

An IBRiS poll for Rzeczpospolita conducted on 9–12 December 2025 found that 51.0% of Poles supported Nawrocki's decision to remove the Round Table from the Presidential Palace, whereas 30.8% opposed it.

An SW Research poll for Onet conducted on 16–17 December 2025 found that 57.4% of Poles believed that Nawrocki should support the Great Orchestra of Christmas Charity and 18.3% believed he should not.

An SW Research poll for Zero.pl conducted on 14–15 April 2026 found that 18.4% of respondents wanted to engage more in party politics, while 59.3% did not.

An SW Research for Rzeczpospolita conducted on 21–22 April 2026 found that 22.8% of Poles wanted Nawrocki to become Prime Minister in the future, akin to Rumen Radev in Bulgaria, while 50.0% did not.

A United Surveys poll for Wirtualna Polska conducted on 24–26 April 2026 found 30.5% of respondents found Nawrocki responsible for the affair regarding the fall of the Zondacrypto cryptocurrency exchange, 21.9% blamed Tusk's government and 33.8% believed that the blame fell only on the owners of Zondacrypto. An Opinia24 poll for RMF FM asking the same question found that 16% blamed Nawrocki, 15% blamed the government, 12% blamed financial oversight institutions, 9% blamed the Polish Olympic Committee, 8% blamed special services, 5% blamed other institutions and 2% placed the blame on nobody.

A United Surveys poll for Wirtualna Polska conducted on 7–9 August 2026 found that 27.0% approved of Nawrocki's decision to grant a pardon to Piotr Staruchowicz, a football ultra sentenced to two years in prison for standing on a fence, while 58.3% disagreed with Nawrocki's decision.

An SW Research poll for Wprost asking about Nawrocki's celebrations for the anniversary of his inauguration found that 44.3% of Poles found the anniversary "inappropriate for the rank of the event", while 32.6% considered the anniversary was "appropriate".

A Pollster poll for Super Express conducted on 7–8 August 2026 found that 76% of respondents thought Nawrocki was working to the benefit of PiS and 62% thought he was working for the benefit of the Confederation, while the remaining respondents thought otherwise.

A United Surveys poll for Wirtualna Polska conducted on 7–9 August 2026 found that regarding Nawrocki's fulfillment of election promises, 31.3% of respondents thought Nawrocki could not fulfill them because of governmental obstruction, 32.9% blamed Nawrocki himself, 24.3% blamed both sides and 6.8% thought Nawrocki was fulfilling his campaign promises.

An SW Research poll for Wprost found that 33.7% of Poles believed Nawrocki's political platform had superior youth appeal than Rafał Trzaskowski's while 29.7% believed Trzaskowski's did; 20.4% believed both platforms had similar youth appeal.

A United Surveys poll for Wirtualna Polska conducted on 2–4 October 2026 found that, regarding the dispute between Nawrocki and Tusk's government over the fuel price legislation, 26.3% of respondents believed Donald Tusk came out of it strengthened, 24.6% believed Nawrocki did and 12.1% believed both did. 34.8% believed neither came out strengthened and 2.2% had no opinion.

An SW Research poll for Onet conducted on 7–8 October 2026 found that 46.7% of Poles rated negatively the fact that three horses are kept at one of the presidential residences for the use of Nawrocki and his family, while 30.3% rated it positively and 22.9% had no opinion.

== Election matchups ==
=== First round ===
Polling firm/Link	Fieldwork date	Sample size	Nawrocki Ind. (PiS)	Sikorski KO	Trzaskowski KO	Mentzen KWiN	Braun KKP	Hołownia PL2050	Pełczyńska -Nałęcz PL2050	Kosiniak -Kamysz PSL	Zandberg Razem	Biejat NL	Others	Don't know	Lead
OGB	25 Mar – 4 Apr 2026	1,000	37.68	37.05		6.09	6.24		0.65	3.52	5.83	2.94			0.63
IBRiS	30–31 Jan 2026	1,067	39.6		27.4	6.9	6.7	1.1			5.3	4.8	3.2 (Note: Sum results of all other candidates participating in the 2025 Polish presidential election)	5.0	12.2
2025 presidential election	Election result	19,603,784	29.54		31.36	14.81	6.34	4.99			4.86	4.23	3.87		1.82

An SW Research poll for Wprost conducted on 5 August 2026 showed that 38.6% of respondents declared intention to re-elect Nawrocki, while 45.0% would vote against him. A Pollster poll for Super Express conducted on 7–8 August 2026 found that 47% would vote for Nawrocki again, while 47% would not.

=== Second round ===
Polling firm/Link	Fieldwork date	Sample size	Nawrocki Ind. (PiS)	Sikorski KO	Trzaskowski KO	Don't know	Abstain	Lead
OGB	25 Mar – 4 Apr 2026	1,000	49.09	48.40		2.52		0.69
Pollster / "SE.pl"	15–17 Nov 2025	1,003	50.06		49.94			0.12
Opinia24 / Polityka	22–24 Oct 2025	1,001	40		30	11	19	10
2025 presidential election	Election result	20,844,163	50.89		49.11			1.78

=== Do you believe Nawrocki will be re-elected in 2030? ===
Date(s) conducted	Polling firm/Link	Sample size	Yes	No	Don't know/Neutral	Lead
14–16 Nov 2025	United Surveys / WP.pl	1,000	43.8	33.7	22.5	10.1

== See also ==
- 2025 Polish presidential election
