= Elżbieta Rafalska =

Polish politician (born 1955)

Elżbieta Rafalska CCCHOM MEP
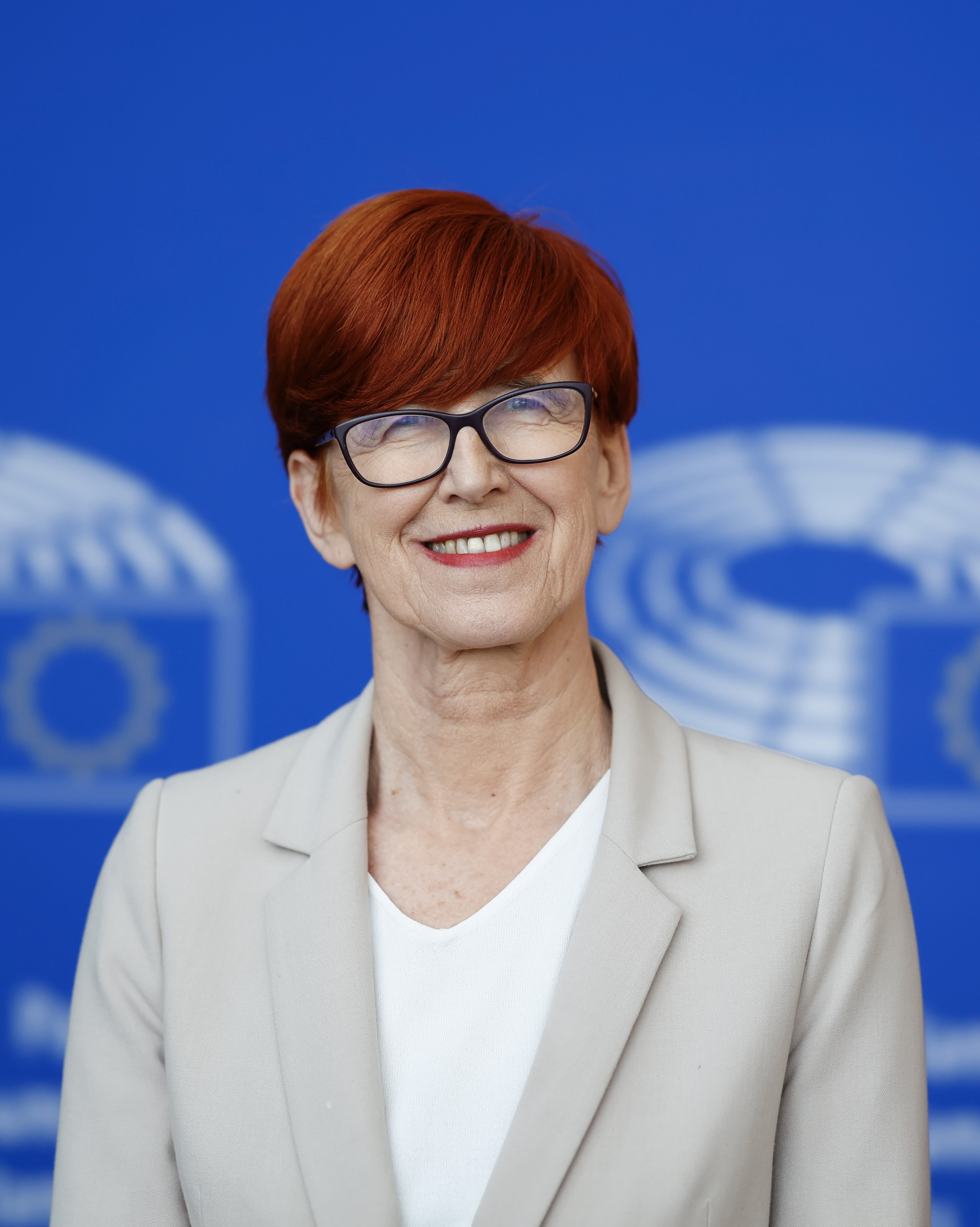
- Rafalska in 2024

Member of the European Parliament for Lubusz and West Pomeranian
- In office 2 July 2019 – 15 July 2024

Minister of Family, Labour and Social Policy
- In office 16 November 2015 – 4 June 2019
- Prime Minister: Beata Szydło; Mateusz Morawiecki
- Preceded by: Władysław Kosiniak-Kamysz
- Succeeded by: Bożena Borys-Szopa

Secretary of State for Labour and Social Policy
- In office 24 August 2007 – 3 December 2007
- Prime Minister: Jarosław Kaczyński
- Minister: Joanna Kluzik-Rostkowska
- Succeeded by: Jarosław Duda
- In office 6 June 2006 – 5 April 2007
- Prime Minister: Jarosław Kaczyński
- Minister: Anna Kalata
- Succeeded by: Halina Olendzka

Personal details
- Born: 22 June 1955 (age 71) Wschowa, Polish People's Republic
- Party: Law and Justice
- Education: University of Szczecin
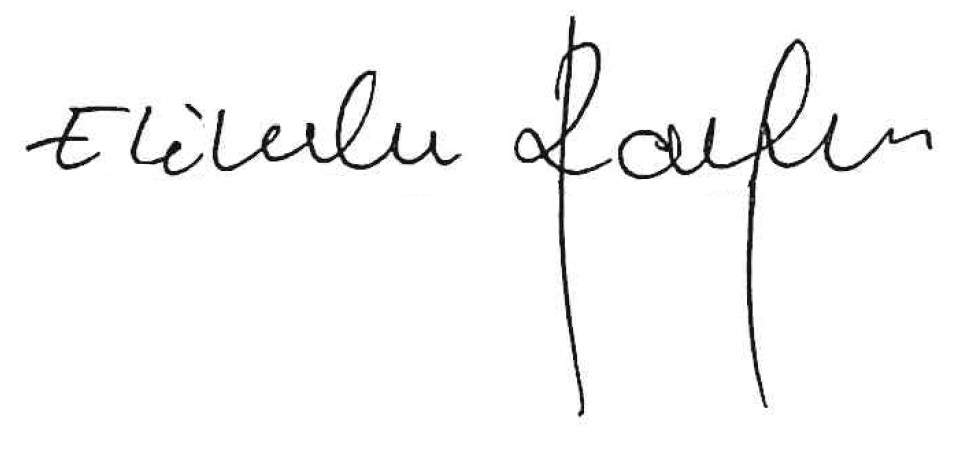
- Signature
- Raab served as

Elżbieta Rafalska (Note: Polish pronunciation: [ɛlʐˈbjɛta raˈfalska]) (née Kajzer; born 22 June 1955) is a Polish politician, and former Minister of Family, Labour and Social Policy, serving 2015 to 2019. Since 2007, Rafalska has been a Member of the Sejm and the Senate.

== Education ==
She graduated from the Poznan University of Physical Education, Gorzów Wielkopolski branch. She graduated from the University of Szczecin in 1998 with a degree in special education, and completed further postgraduate studies in 2001 in social work.

== Career ==
She was a member of the sixth term of the Senate, and was a member of the Sejm during its sixth, seventh, and eighth terms. She served as the Secretary of State of the then-Ministry of Labour and Social Policy, now renamed to the Ministry of Family, Labour and Social Policy. In 2015, she was elected to the Sejm, receiving 22,898 votes. On 16 November of that year she was appointed to the position of Minister of Family, Labour and Social Policy by Prime Minister Beata Szydło. She maintained this position in the 2017 government of newly-elected Prime Minister Mateusz Morawiecki.

In the 2019 Polish European Parliament election, she was elected as a member of parliament, receiving 70,916 votes. Due to her new role in the European Parliament, she was succeeded by Bożena Borys-Szopa as Minister of Family, Labour, and Social Policy. She ran unsuccessfully in the 2024 Polish European Parliament.

== Political positions ==
In November 2024, Rafalska said that she "[had] no doubt" that the Civic Coalition primaries were manipulated by Donald Tusk in order to "humiliate" Rafał Trzaskowski and Radosław Sikorski.

In a December 2024 interview, Rafalska emphasised the importance of ensuring that the country does not suffer human capital flight from what she claimed was the increasing amount of young Poles emigrating abroad. She blamed PiS's opposition party, Civic Platform, saying that they "did nothing to keep young Poles in the country".

During the 2019 social worker union strikes, Rafalska blamed local governments for not compensating social workers adequately and said that there was nothing the national government could do about the situation. According to the Ministry of Family, Labour and Social Policy, the national government sets the minimum wage for social workers whilst the local governments determine the social workers' salaries.

== Awards ==
Rafalska received the Grzegorz Palka Award in 2017 for "implementing the 500+ Programme in cooperation with local governments" and was given the "Fighter for the Family" award by Platform for the Family Catalonia-ONU for 500+ Programme being an "important instrument promoting the family".

In 2017, Hungarian President János Áder awarded her the Commander's Cross of the Order of Merit for her work in developing and strengthening Polish-Hungarian relations in the field of family and social policy.
