= Agnieszka Dziemianowicz-Bąk =

Polish social activist and politician (born 1984)

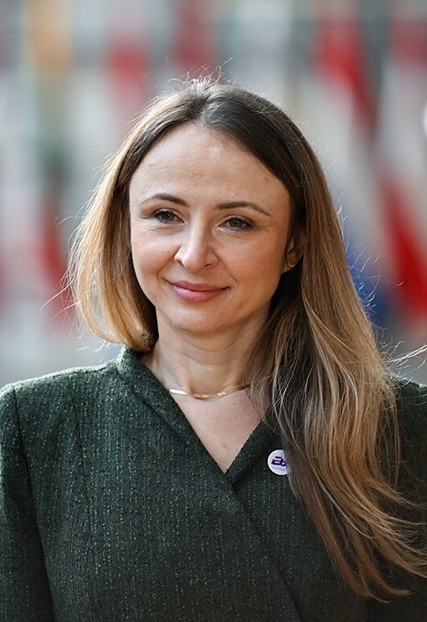
- Dziemianowicz-Bąk in 2025

Minister of Family, Labour and Social Policy
- Incumbent
- Assumed office 13 December 2023
- Prime Minister: Donald Tusk
- Preceded by: Dorota Bojemska

Member of the Sejm
- Incumbent
- Assumed office 12 November 2019
- Constituency: Słupsk (2023–present); Wrocław (2019–2023)

Personal details
- Born: Agnieszka Dziemianowicz; 20 January 1984 (age 42) Wrocław, Poland
- Party: New Left (Since 2021); Left Together (2015–2019)
- Other party: The Left (Since 2019)
- Education: University of Wrocław
- Occupation: Politician
- Known for: Black protest

Agnieszka Ewa Dziemianowicz-Bąk [aɡˈɲɛʂka d͡ʑɛmjaˈnɔvit͡ʂ bɔŋk] (born 20 January 1984) is a Polish social activist and politician representing the New Left party who has served as the Minister of Family, Labour and Social Policy since 2023. She has been a member of the Sejm since 2019.

== Early life and career ==
After graduation in 2003 of Adam Mickiewicz High School No. III in Wrocław, she completed her studies in pedagogy at the Faculty of Historical and Pedagogical Sciences (2008) and philosophy at the Faculty of Social Sciences (2009) at the University of Wrocław (UWr). In 2009, she began her doctoral studies at the Institute of Philosophy at UWr. In 2018, she obtained a Ph.D. in the humanities, specializing in philosophy, based on her dissertation titled Reprodukcja – Opór – Upełnomocnienie. Radykalna krytyka edukacji we współczesnej zachodniej myśli społecznej (transl. Reproduction, Resistance, Empowerment: A Radical Critique of Education in Contemporary Western Social Thought), supervised by Professor Adam Chmielewski. She is the author of articles and academic publications.

In May 2010, she began a permanent collaboration with the Ferdinand Lassalle Center for Social Thought in Wrocław. Between 2010 and 2016, she worked as a research assistant at the Educational Research Institute in Warsaw, focusing on studying and analyzing educational policy. Her research encompassed the educational activities of local governments, collaborations with organizations empowering youth from small towns, and initiatives establishing preschools in rural areas.

== Political career ==
Between December 2015 and February 2019, Dziemianowicz-Bąk was a member of the National Board of the Lewica Razem party. She represented Razem in the Democracy in Europe Movement 2025 (DiEM25) pan-European organisation.

In 2016, Foreign Policy magazine included Dziemianowicz-Bąk, together with Barbara Nowacka, on its annual list of the 100 most influential global thinkers for their role in organising the "black protest" against a total ban on abortion in Poland.

In February 2019, she left the Razem party due to disagreements over party strategy in then-upcoming elections to the European Parliament. In August 2019, she was elected to the Coordinating Collective of DiEM25.

Dziemianowicz-Bąk was elected to the Sejm on 13 October 2019, receiving 14,257 votes in the Wrocław district, campaigning from The Left list.

Aside from protesting abortion laws, Dziemianowicz-Bąk has also been active in protests for LGBT rights. In September 2020, she won the Equality Crowns award for politics from Campaign Against Homophobia. She said that she wished such an award was not necessary.

On 13 December 2023, she was appointed as the Minister of Family, Labour and Social Policy by Donald Tusk.
