= State Labour Inspection (Poland) =

Polish government agency

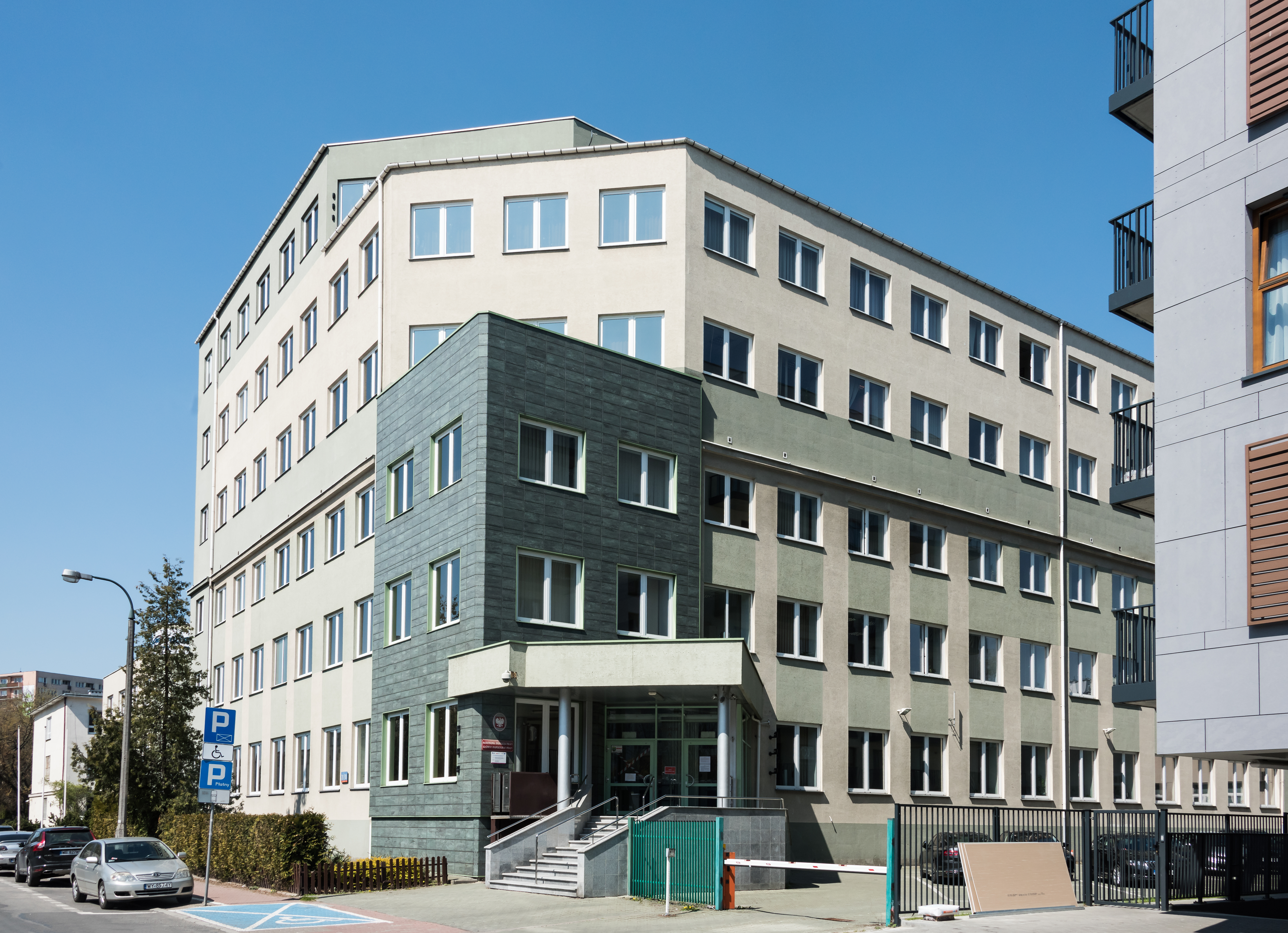
State Labour Inspection seat in Warsaw

State Labour Inspection (Polish: Państwowa Inspekcja Pracy) is a state body in Poland to supervise and monitor compliance with labour law, particularly occupational health and safety regulations. Its predecessor, Labour Inspection (Inspekcja Pracy), was established in 1919.

It is subordinate to the Sejm and supervised by the Labour Protection Council (Rada Ochrony Pracy). The National Labour Inspectorate is composed of: the Chief Labour Inspectorate, district inspectorates and inspectors operating in the field.

Marcin Stanecki was chosen the Chief Labour Inspectorate in 2024. Former Chief Labour Inspectorates included Katarzyna Łażewska-Hrycko, Wiesław Łyszczek, Roman Giedrojć, Iwona Hickiewicz, Anna Tomczyk, Bożena Borys-Szopa, Anna Hintz, Tadeusz J. Zając, Tadeusz Sułkowski, Jan Laskowski, Henryk Kowalski, Zdzisław Wierzbicki, Edmund Żebrowski, Henryk Altman, Marian Klott and Franciszek Sokal.

== Bibliography ==
- Kołodziejczyk, Edward (2003). Inspekcja Pracy w Polsce 1919–1999. Warszawa: Kolpress. ISBN 83-88919-06-7.
