= Abortion in Poland =

Abortion in Poland is legal in cases where the pregnancy is a result of a criminal act or when the woman's life or health is in danger. The last change in the Act on Pregnancy Planning of the Republic of Poland took place on 27 January 2021, when publication of the judgment of the Polish Constitutional Tribunal in the Dziennik Ustaw RP took place.

Poland is one of the few countries in the world where abortion became largely outlawed since the 1990s after decades of permissive liberalized legislation during the communist-era Polish People's Republic. In 2010, about 10 to 15% of abortions on Polish pregnant women had to be carried out outside Poland due to the strict restraints within their own country. Poland's abortion law is also one of the most restrictive in the European Union (EU) and Europe in general, along with a group of other traditionally Roman Catholic countries of the region (e.g. Malta, Liechtenstein, Vatican City, Monaco and Andorra).

In July 2024, a bill sponsored by the Donald Tusk government to allow abortion on request during the first trimester was rejected by the Polish lower house in a 218–215 vote. In November 2024, the Sejm sent the bill to further debate after it was re-introduced by the Left parliamentary group.

The incumbent president of Poland, Karol Nawrocki, opposes liberalising Poland's abortion laws.

== Legal status ==
As of 27 January 2021, abortion is legal only in cases:

1. when the woman's life or health is endangered by the continuation of pregnancy.
2. when the pregnancy is a result of a criminal act.

Unlike in other countries where abortion is banned, women in Poland are not subject to a penalty for illegal termination of pregnancy; the medical personnel ordering and carrying out the abortion are subject to criminal penalties including imprisonment. Consent of a physician is required for circumstance (1) above, while abortions in view of circumstance (2) above must be certified by a prosecutor. Parental consent is always required if the female seeking an abortion is a minor.

== History ==
=== 20th century ===
Until 1932, abortion was banned in Poland without any exceptions (although an abortion performed in order to save the pregnant woman's life in the absence of any other means to do so, might have been unenforced, as an act of necessity). In that year, the new Penal Code legalised abortion only when there were medical reasons and, for the first time in Europe, when the pregnancy resulted from a criminal act. This made Poland the first country in Europe outside the Soviet Union to legalize abortion in cases of rape and threat to maternal health. Except during the German occupation during the Second World War, this law was in effect from 1932 to 1956. In Nazi Germany, which included territories of Poland from 1939 to 1945, the law allowing unlimited abortions by Polish women was in force since 9 March 1943. This was the only time in the history of Poland when abortion was legal on request, and in fact, abortion for Poles was often forced by Nazis, especially in German concentration camps such as Waltrop-Holthausen and Ravensbrück.

In 1956, the Sejm legalised abortion in cases where the woman was experiencing "difficult living conditions", along with medical reasons and if the pregnancy resulted from a crime. The law, however, did not grant a right to choose to terminate a pregnancy, as an appropriate certificate had to be issued from a doctor, and in case of difficult life circumstances, the authorities had a right to verify whether the woman's circumstances were "sufficiently severe". The official newspaper of the communist party, Trybuna Ludu, described abortion as "harmful and dangerous", and noted that the legislation was caused by socioeconomic concerns rather than seeing abortion as an issue of women's emancipation. Abortion was considered to be effectively illegal as the doctors had a right of 'conscientious objection', and would also refuse to issue a certificate. American historian Sabrina P. Ramet argues that that the communist abortion law was restrictive in practice, writing:

The law passed in April 1956 allowed women to obtain abortions when they faced “exceptionally difficult life conditions”; in practice, this wording was interpreted to limit access to the procedure to “mothers of many children who were already living in poverty.”

The procedural requirements needed for obtaining a legal abortion were changed several times over the years, in 1956, 1959, 1969, 1981 and 1990.

After the end of Communist rule in 1989, abortion legislation in Poland became controversial, as conservative members of the anti-communist Solidarity, supported by the Roman Catholic Church, including highly influential Pope John Paul II, pushed for a complete ban on abortion. Starting from 1990, increasingly stringent requirements were put into place for women trying to obtain an abortion. The Ordinance of April 1990 required consent from three medically qualified specialists and a psychologist, plus the addition of a fee. In May 1992, a new code of ethics approved by the national doctors' guild practically banned abortions in most public facilities. Finally, in 1993, the law was further tightened, removing entirely "difficult living conditions" as a ground for abortions. As such, abortions could be legally obtained only in cases of serious threat to the life or health of the pregnant woman, as attested by two physicians, cases of rape or incest confirmed by a prosecutor, and cases in which prenatal tests, confirmed by two physicians, demonstrated that the fetus was seriously and irreversibly damaged. In 1996, the law was amended to allow abortion on social grounds. However, this law was struck down in 1997 by the Constitutional Court.

=== 21st century ===
Throughout the 21st century, there have been efforts to make abortion laws more restrictive.

In 2007, anti-abortion groups tried to have legal protection of human life from conception included in the constitution. The attempt was unsuccessful.

In June 2011, Polish anti-abortion NGOs collected over 500,000 signatures for a proposed bill to ban abortion in Poland altogether. The bill, while rejected by a majority of the MPs, got enough support to be sent to a Sejm committee for further amendments. The move was criticised by two right-wing opposition parties, Law and Justice and Poland Comes First, which expressed their support for the bill. The left-wing Democratic Left Alliance pursues a policy in favor of abortion rights and was against the bill. The ruling Civic Platform, while considering itself in favour of the current legislation, was divided on the matter; more than 60 of the party's MPs voted in favour of the bill.

In 2016, a civilian bill draft was submitted, providing for imprisonment for unlawful abortion of both the abortion doctor and the woman. This sparked strong social opposition. In response, a draft was submitted assuming the unlimited access to abortion until the end of the 12th week of pregnancy. None of the bills were ever passed.

On 27 October 2017, under pressure from Bishops and lay Catholic groups, right-wing deputies from various parties made an application to the Constitutional Tribunal to declare the admissibility of abortion unconstitutional in the case of a high probability of severe and irreversible fetal impairment or an incurable disease that threatens the fetus. Because of the end of the term of office of the Sejm and new parliamentary election, this application was renewed by deputies in November 2019.

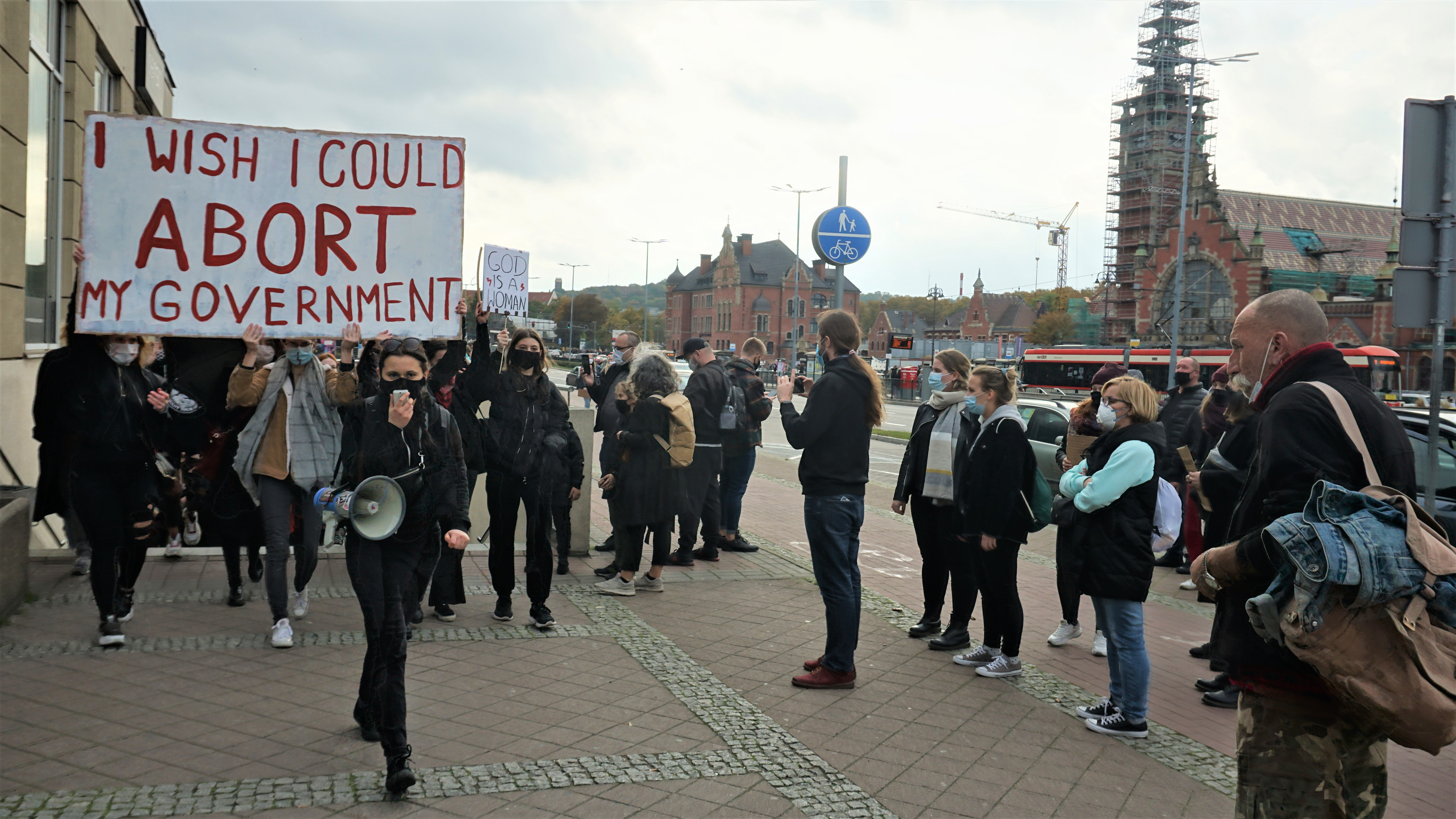
Protest in Gdańsk against Poland's new abortion laws, 24 October 2020

On 22 October 2020, the Polish Constitutional Tribunal found that abortion on embryopathological grounds is unconstitutional as it discriminates against the unborn on the grounds of their state of health and violates the right to life of every human being, as protected by Article 38 of the Polish Constitution.

The chief justice, Julia Przyłębska, said in a ruling that existing legislation – one of Europe's most restrictive – that allows for the abortion of malformed fetuses was incompatible with the constitution. After the ruling goes into effect, abortion will only be permissible in Poland in the case of rape, incest or a threat to the mother's health and life, which make up only about 2% of legal terminations conducted in recent years.

Support was expressed by Kaja Godek, who additionally supports the prohibition of abortion when conception occurs as a result of rape. The anti-abortion activist was asked on Radio Zet about the remaining cases of termination of pregnancy. The second option allows abortion if the pregnancy resulted from a prohibited act, such as rape (up to 12 weeks from conception). Godek stated, "I trust that this regulation will also be abolished, because we are for the full protection of life. A child conceived of rape is also a victim of rape. It has the right to conceive."

Most members of the European Parliament condemned Poland's new anti-abortion resolution.

On 27 January 2021, the judgment of the Constitutional Tribunal entered into force following its publication in the Journal of Laws.

The death of a 37-year-old pregnant woman, after her doctors told her they could not perform an abortion of her dead foetus as the foetus's twin was still alive, led to increased protests from women's and abortion-rights activists. The family, as well as the women's rights group All-Poland Women's Strike blame the death on the 2020 verdict, claiming it had a chilling effect on Polish doctors.

=== Graphical summary of history of Polish abortion law ===
Date	Risk to life	Risk to health	Rape	Fetal impairment	Economic or social	On request
11 November 1918 – 1 September 1932	(Note: This ground was not explicitly mentioned in the law, but it was accepted as emerging from general criminal law principles of necessity.)					
1 September 1932 – 9 March 1943						
9 March 1943 – July 1944/January 1945						
July 1944/January 1945 – 8 May 1956						
8 May 1956 – 14 March 1993					No (Note: Abortion was allowed in case of "exceptionally difficult life conditions"; however, "in practice, this wording was interpreted to limit access to the procedure to mothers of many children who were already living in poverty." Additionally, doctors had a right to verify whether the patient's circumstances were "sufficiently difficult". Thus, "the regulations concerning the termination of pregnancy on social grounds led to many doctors exploiting this loophole to refuse women state-funded procedures".)	
14 March 1993 – 1 April 1997						
1 April 1997 – 18 December 1997						
18 December 1997 – 27 January 2021						
27 January 2021–						

== 2015–2016 ==
=== Proposed abortion ban ===
In September 2015, a civil initiative to introduce a complete ban on abortion was rejected in the Sejm. 178 MPs backed the measure, while 206 voted against.

In April 2016, Polish organizations proposed amended legislation to ban abortion in all cases except to save the woman's life. The bill included penalties to abortion providers with up to five years' imprisonment. The bill passed and was debated in the Sejm from 22 September 2016. The Sejm voted, with the majority in favour of continuing work on the bill. A competing bill proposing liberalization of abortion laws, supported by a civil initiative that succeeded in gathering the required number of signatures, was rejected outright in the same session of the Sejm. If the ban had passed, Poland's abortion restrictions would have mirrored those of Malta and the Vatican, the two countries in Europe with the strongest restrictions on abortion.

=== Black Protest ===
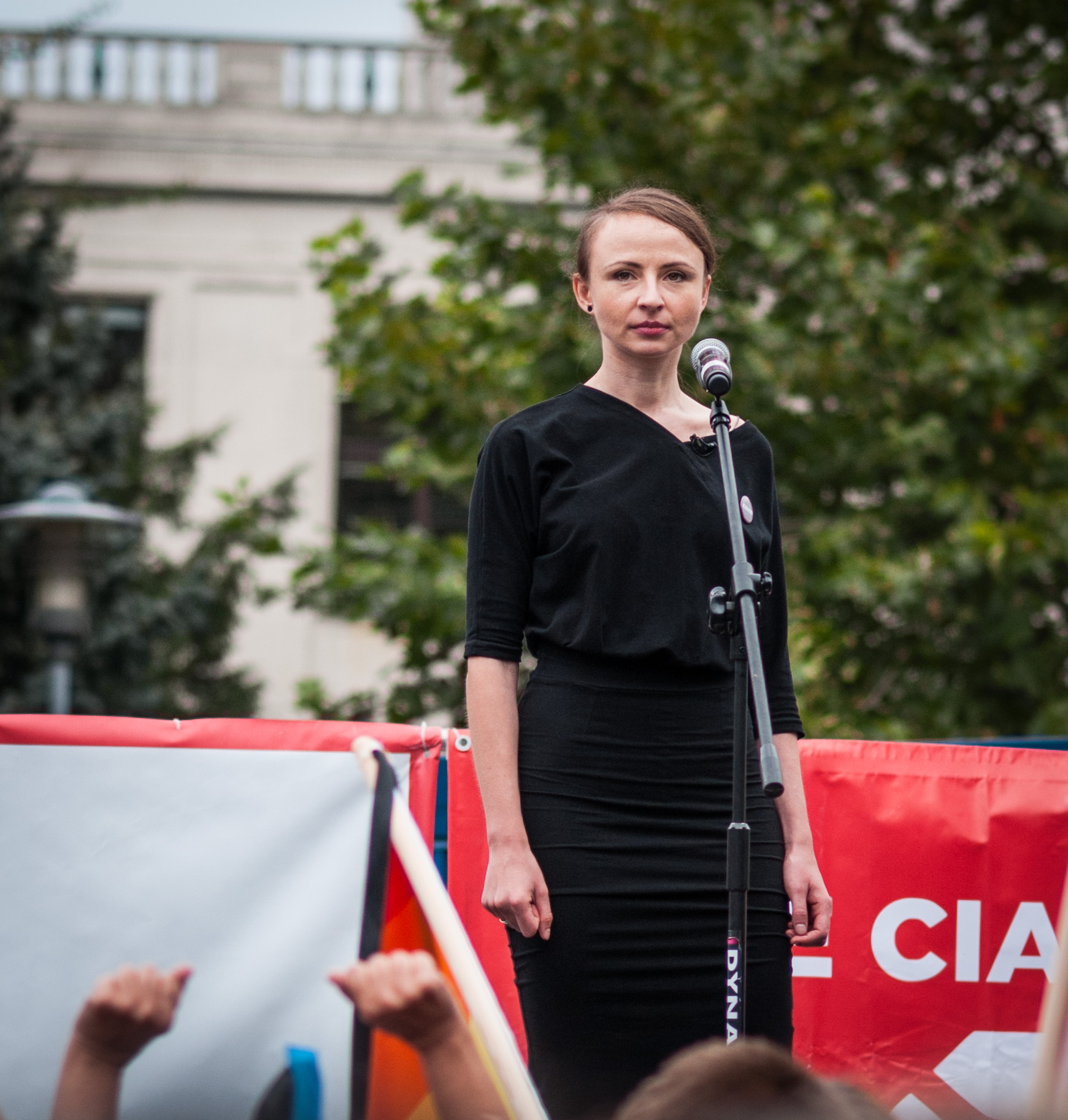
Agnieszka Dziemianowicz-Bąk of the Razem National Board during the 2016 protests against a total ban on abortion

On 22 September 2016, on the day when the bill to ban abortion was debated in the Sejm, the Razem party organized a demonstration called "Czarny Protest" ("Black Protest"), initiated by party member Małgorzata Adamczyk. This was part of a larger campaign, in which people published selfies in black clothing in social media, tagged #czarnyprotest (#blackprotest). In the subsequent days, similar protests were being organized in other Polish cities, such as Wrocław, Łódź and Kraków. Thousands of people took part in the protests in various parts of Poland. On 1 October 2016, a large protest also took place near the Sejm building, organized by Barbara Nowacka of Inicjatywa Polska, who had collected signatures under a citizens' bill to liberalize the Polish abortion law.

On 3 October 2016, thousands of Polish women went on strike to oppose the proposed legislation for a total ban on abortion. The event was called "Czarny Poniedziałek" ("Black Monday") and was originally proposed in a Facebook post by Polish actress Krystyna Janda. The women modeled their strike on the successful strike for women's rights in Iceland in 1975, refusing to attend school, work, or participate in domestic chores. The pro abortion protesters marched in Warsaw, Gdańsk, Łódź, Wrocław, and Kraków, and demonstrators across Europe marched in solidarity. Approximately 98,000 protestors showed up to decry the new bill. Supporters of the new legislation held counterprotests and Catholic Masses to express alignment with the abortion ban.

By 5 October 2016, politicians were distancing themselves from the proposed legislation. On 6 October, lawmakers voted the bill down with plans to present a counterproposal from the government.

In 2016, Foreign Policy magazine included Agnieszka Dziemianowicz-Bąk of the Razem party and Barbara Nowacka of Inicjatywa Polska on its annual list of the 100 most influential global thinkers for their role in organizing protests against a total ban on abortion in Poland. In 2018, Forbes magazine included Marcelina Zawisza on its annual European Forbes 30 Under 30 list in the "Law & Policy" category for her role as a co-founder of Razem and one of the organizers of "black protest".

This protest inspired a similar event in Ireland, Strike 4 Repeal, to repeal the Ireland's Eighth Amendment which banned abortion in nearly all cases.

What was especially powerful about the Black Protest was the fact that there were events organized in smaller locations, too.

The Polish Black Protests sparked protests in a number of cities internationally.

The protest activities included not only demonstrating in the streets but also (depending on the location) high school students strikes, men's support events, queer community solidarity events, sending letters, changing profile pictures in the social media, fundraising events, entrepreneurs support, doctoral students' strike, prenatal testing, collective meditation, a running race, etc.

Symbols of the protest included umbrellas and coat hangers. Specific weather conditions on 3 October 2016 contributed to establishing a symbol of the latest women's protests in Poland. It was raining during that day but still, thousands of people attended events, bringing their umbrellas to demonstrations to protect themselves from the rain. It also had its symbolic dimension - crowds visually changed into a sea of umbrellas which embodied the purpose of the Black Protest - protecting women from proposed legislation that would restrict their reproductive rights. Coat hangers were brought to the demonstrations as a symbol of the simplest and most primitive instrument that could be used for conducting abortion. Earlier in 2016 (in April), coat hangers were also sent by citizens to the contemporary Prime Minister of Poland, Beata Szydło, as a protest against her support for the abortion ban.

However, though social media has empowered Polish women, for some it has led to being ostracized by family members or colleagues, and has even cost them their careers. Among the best-known instances was that of Ewa Wnorowska, an educator in Zabrze who has dedicated her life to helping students at a school for children with disabilities. On the day of the first Black Protest, as the movement in support of women's rights in Poland became known, she took a photograph with eleven other colleagues, all wearing black, to show solidarity with the cause. Unbeknownst to her at the time of posting, the photograph gained national traction; it was being splashed over Polish newspapers, social media, and debated far and wide. One of her male colleagues reposted the image with inflammatory comments, and lodged a formal complaint in front of the Disciplinary Board of Education against her. Since then, Human Rights Watch published a 75-page report in February 2019 titled "'The Breath of the Government on My Back': Attacks on Women's Rights in Poland", which has found that government agencies have dragged employees who support women's rights protests or collaborate with women's rights groups before disciplinary hearings and threatened their jobs. The report argued that these were not exceptional cases. A climate of fear arose in Poland, where cases like Wnorowska's were used to show ordinary people that speaking out against the government has consequences.

Although the strikes did not result in a complete reversal of anti-abortion laws in Poland, it brought the conversation of women's reproductive rights to national attention. Thousands of women wore black in solidarity with the cause. Moreover, the protest succeeded in deterring the government from passing a proposed law that would restrict all abortions.

== 2020 ==
=== 2020 Constitutional Tribunal ruling ===
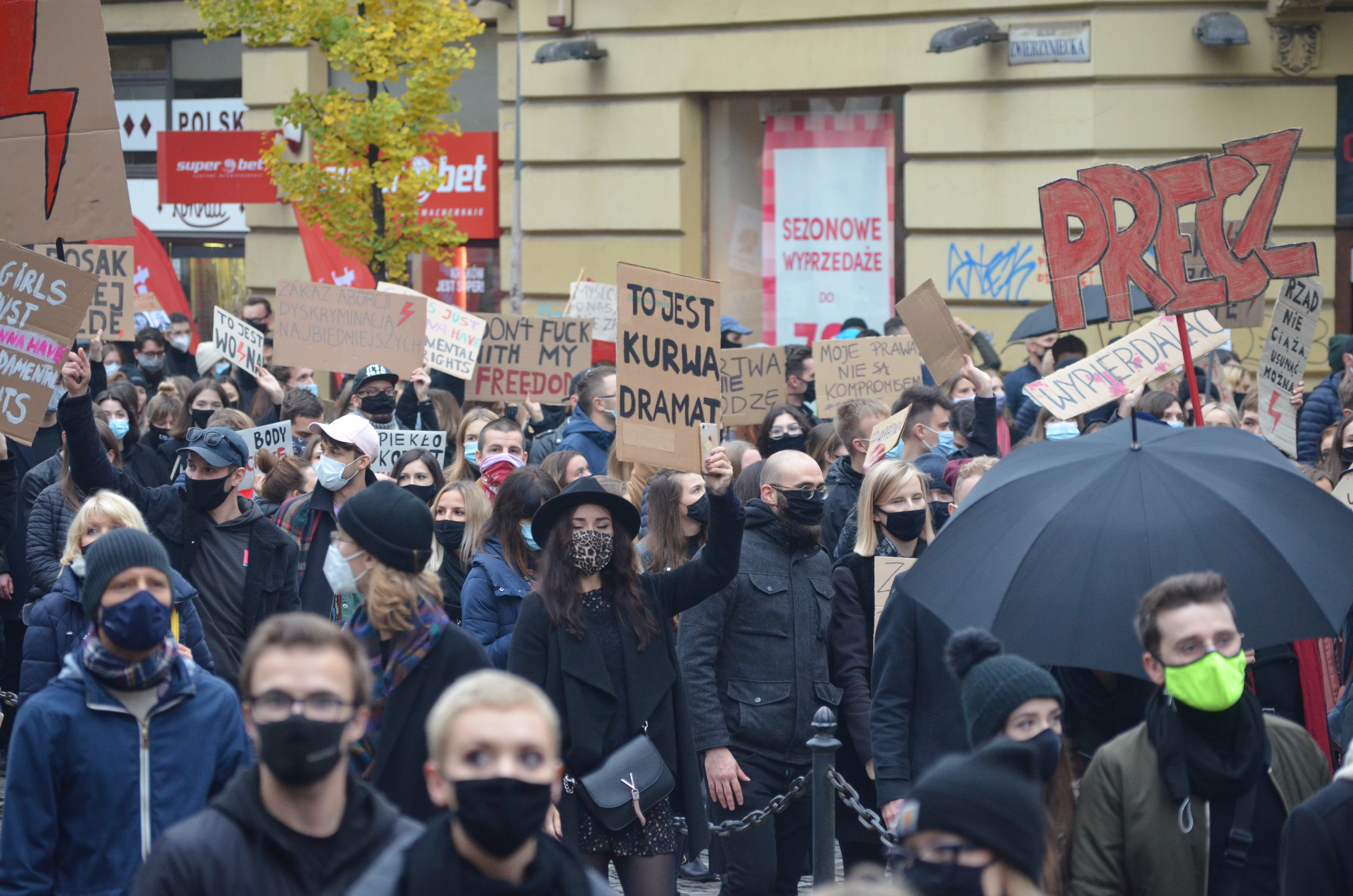
2020 Polish protests in Kraków

On 22 October 2020, the Constitutional Tribunal, consisting mainly of judges appointed by the ruling party Law and Justice (PiS), declared the law authorising abortions for malformed fetuses to be unconstitutional, effectively banning most of the small number of official abortions carried out in Poland. Street protests by people opposed to the ruling took place on 22 October, and in 60 Polish towns on the night of 23 October, and again on 24 October, in the town centres, in front of PiS offices, and in front of the office of religious administrations. On 25 October, protesters staged sit-ins in Catholic churches, disrupting Sunday Mass in several cities, including Katowice and Poznań.

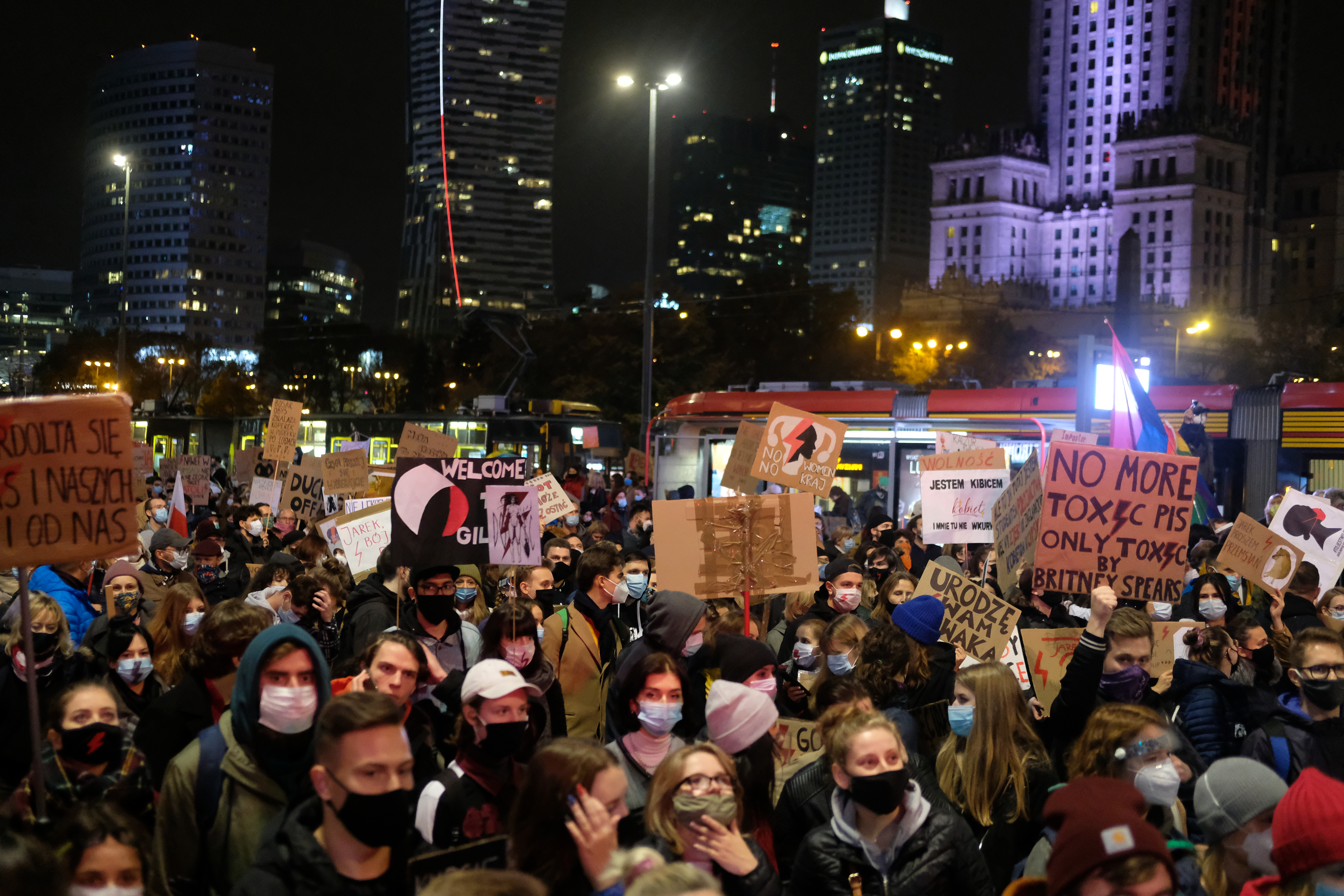
Protesters against the Constitutional Tribunal's ruling gather in Warsaw on October 30th, 2020

On 23 October, the prime minister Mateusz Morawiecki issued an order for the Military Gendarmerie to help the civilian police in the "protection of safety and public order" starting from 28 October 2020; a nationwide women's strike was scheduled for that day. The official reason for the order was the COVID-19 pandemic in Poland. TVN24 commented that the order was issued during the women's rights protests. The Polish Ministry of Defence stated on Twitter that the Military Gendarmerie's policing role was "standard" and unrelated to the women's rights protests.

UN independent human rights experts criticize the Poland court's ruling for a near complete ban on abortions on the grounds of fatal or severe foetal impairment. They also called the Polish authorities to respect the rights of men and women protesting against the court's ruling.

On 30 October 2020, about 100,000 people took to the streets of Warsaw in a protest against the Polish authorities over the ruling on abortion rights.

Since the ruling several women died from a septic shock, after the doctors refused to perform an abortion in fear of the legal persectution. Following their deaths, over 70 protests took place, both in Poland and abroad, under the slogan of 'No more [women]' ('Ani Jednej Więcej').

== Stances of political parties ==
Confederation wants to "protect human life from the moment of conception". Law and Justice supports abortion only in case of danger to woman's health and rape. Civic Platform wants to allow abortion for socioeconomic reasons. The Left supports abortion on demand up to the 12th week of pregnancy.

== 2023 parliamentary elections ==
Prior to the 2023 Polish parliamentary election, Fundacja na Rzecz Kobiet i Planowania Rodziny (FEDERA, Foundation for Women and Family Planning) created an election guide informing voters on each party's political stance on sexual education, sexual health and women's rights. The guide assessed parties based on their stance on:

- Legal abortion until the 12th week of pregnancy
- Ending of restrictions for 'day after' emergency contraception
- Ending of conscientious objection to abortion
- Public funding of in vitro fertilisation
- Sexual education in schools
- State funded pre-natal tests regardless of woman's age

According to their findings the only party who supported all of the above in their 2023 political programme was The Together Party. In contrast Nonpartisan Local Government Activists (Bezpartyjni Samorządowcy) either did not include or actively did not support any of these causes. Importantly, then-government Law and Justice (Prawo i Sprawiedliwosc) (supported by 35.34% of voters a month after the election) also did not include these demands in their programme, nor did they actively oppose them.

== 2024 developments ==
In July 2024, a bill sponsored by the Donald Tusk government to allow abortion on request during the first trimester was rejected by the Polish lower house in a 218-215 vote.

The next month, the government published executive guidelines adopting a wider construction of the existing exception for woman's health.

== 2026 protests ==
On 22 October 2026, demonstrations for legal abortion took place in 28 cities including Warsaw, Kraków, Poznań, Wrocław, and Częstochowa; in some cities, they were accompanied by counter-demonstrations by nationalist groups.

== Public opinion ==
Support for abortion on request (Nov 2014 CBOS poll)
answers	%
Oppose	55
Support	37
Neutral	8

Support for abortion on request (Apr 2019 Kantar poll) up to the 12th week of pregnancy
answers	%
Oppose	35
Support	58
Neutral	7

Support for abortion in Poland (Oct 2020 Kantar poll)
answers	%
Should be illegal	11
Only in certain circumstances	62
On demand	22
Don't know	5

Support for abortion on request (May 2022 OKO.press poll) up to the 12th week of pregnancy
answers	%
Oppose	25
Support	66
Neutral	8

In a 2014 poll on abortion by the CBOS Public Opinion Research Center, 65% of Poles viewed abortion as immoral and unacceptable and only 27% viewed it as acceptable, a drop of 4% compared to an older poll from 2009. In a CBOS poll from February 2014, more than half of the participants (55%) opposed the right to abortion on request. Furthermore, 71% of the participants believed abortion on request was inappropriate. At the same time, over one-third (37%) thought that abortion should be permitted.

Surveys indicate a conservative turn in the 1990s. Although the supporters of legal abortion prevailed, the difference continuously narrowed. In 2006, when the discussion about introducing a constitutional ban on abortion was publicly conducted, the opponents of legal abortion were for the first time more numerous than supporters of abortion rights. At present the proportions have returned to 2007 levels, when both groups were about equal in size.

Most Poles accept abortion in cases when it is legal under current law. The support for abortion rights when mother's life is in danger is almost universal (87%). Over three-quarters of respondents think that it should be available for women whose pregnancy threatens their health (78%), or was caused by rape or incest (78%). Three-fifths (60%) support the right to abortion if it is known that the child would be disabled.

The support for legal abortion in cases when it is currently banned is much lower. In a 2010 study it was found that for a quarter it should be legal if the woman is in a difficult material (26%) or personal (23%) situation. Almost one in five respondents (18%) think abortion should be legal if a woman does not want to have a child.

A poll from 2013 showed that 49% of Poles support current legislation on abortion, 34% think it should be liberalised and 9% think it should be more restrictive.

A CBOS poll from 2013 found that 75% of Poles think abortion is "always wrong and can never be justified". Only 7% thought there was "nothing wrong with it and could always be justified".

In a Pew Research poll from 2017, 8% of Polish respondents believed abortion should be legal in all cases and 33% that it should be legal in most cases. On the other hand, 38% believed that it should be illegal in most cases and 13% that it should be illegal in all cases.

In a poll from 2019, 58% of respondents said that "Women in Poland should have the right to abortion on demand up to the 12th week of pregnancy", 35% was against and 7% of respondents had no opinion on that topic.

A poll undergone during the first week of the October-November 2020 Polish protests found that 22% of respondents support abortion on demand to the 12th week of pregnancy, 62% support it only in certain circumstances, 11% support making abortion fully illegal while 5% are undecided.

An OKO.press poll from May 2022 found that 66% of Polish respondents supported allowing abortion up to the 12th week of pregnancy. According to this poll, 83% of women and 80% of men aged 18 to 39 supported abortion. In comparison, 57% of men and 52% of women aged 60 or older supported abortion. Support for abortion also differed between rural and urban Poles, with 78% of respondents living in cities with more than 100,000 inhabitants supporting abortion, compared to only 58% of respondents from rural areas.

Support for abortion depending on circumstances (October 2022 Rzeczpospolita poll)
answers	%
entirely legal without mentioning about detailed fetal age restrictions	13.5
on demand up to 12th week of pregnancy	35.7
in case of danger to mother's life and health, incest and rape and fetal impartment (turning back to law before Tribunal ruling)	26.6
in case of dangerous mother's life and health and incest and rape (current law)	12.3
total abortion ban without exceptions	5.3
no opinion	6.6

Another poll (conducted in October 2022) made by Rzeczpospolita (Polish political journalistic magazine) showed that 13.5% supported unlimited right to abortion. 35.7% wanted abortion law to be liberalized on demand up to 12th week of pregnancy. 26.6% of people wanted to liberalize current law by turning back to laws existing before October 2020 (in case of fetal abnormalities, rape and incest, and danger to the health of life of the mother). 12.3% want to keep current legislation. 5.3% want abortion to be totally banned and 6.6% has no stance on this matter.

== Statistics ==
=== Legal abortions ===
View source data.

Sources: The Polish Ministry of Health publishes yearly official data on legal abortions and their reasons. The number has been stable over the years, between 1,000 and 2,000. In 2019, there were 1,110 legal abortions, 1,074 of them were for cases of fetal defects. Among these, 271 were for Down syndrome without other anomalies, and 60 cases were for Patau syndrome or Edwards syndrome without other anomalies.

=== Illegal abortions ===
Estimates vary as to how many illegal abortions are carried out each year. The Federation for Women and Family Planning, a feminist NGO, gives a range between 80,000 and 200,000 abortions, and about a quarter of all Polish women had terminated a pregnancy. The Public Opinion Research Center has the same estimate.

The BBC reported estimates of illegal abortions per year ranging between 10,000 and 150,000, compared to only 1,000–2,000 legal abortions.

Another way to guess the number of illegal abortions in Poland is to look at worldwide behavior and trends. According to Sedgh, Singh, Henshaw and Bankole in a 2012 article published in The Lancet, drawing on various reports, the number of fertile women (aged 15–44) who undergo an abortion ranges between about 10 to 40 abortions per 1,000 women, for the 2000s, "in all regions of the world, regardless of the status of abortion laws"; this would imply lower to upper estimates of yearly abortions by Polish women of about 75,000 to 300,000.

=== Abortions abroad ===
Some women seek abortions abroad with Germany, the Czech Republic, and Slovakia being among the more popular destinations for abortions. The UK, Austria, and Ukraine are also countries some women travel to for abortions.

== See also ==
- Tysiąc v. Poland
- P. and S. v. Poland
