= Bożena Borys-Szopa =

Polish trade union activist and politician

Minister of Family, Labour and Social Policy
- In office 4 June 2019 – 15 November 2019
- President: Andrzej Duda
- Prime Minister: Mateusz Morawiecki
- Preceded by: Elżbieta Rafalska
- Succeeded by: Marlena Maląg

Chief Labour Inspector
- In office 15 March 2006 – 21 August 2008
- Preceded by: Anna Hintz
- Succeeded by: Tadeusz Zając

Member of Sejm
- Incumbent
- Assumed office 12 November 2015

Personal details
- Born: March 11, 1954 (age 72) Lędziny, Poland
- Party: Law and Justice
- Education: University of Silesia
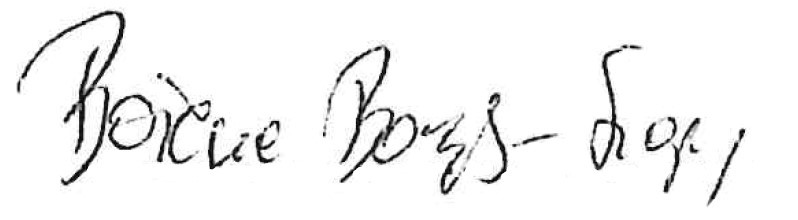
- Signature

Bożena Teresa Borys-Szopa (born 11 March 1954) is a Polish trade union activist and politician. She was the chief labour inspector (2006–2008), minister in the Chancellery of the President (2009–2010), and minister of family, labour and social policy (2009).

While working for President Lech Kaczyński, Borys-Szopa focused on social dialogue and labor law. She was part of the regional legislature in the Silesian Voivodeship, and is now in her second term as an MP.
