= Ministry of Family, Labour and Social Policy =

Government ministry of Poland

- Ministerstwo Rodziny, Pracy i Polityki Społecznej
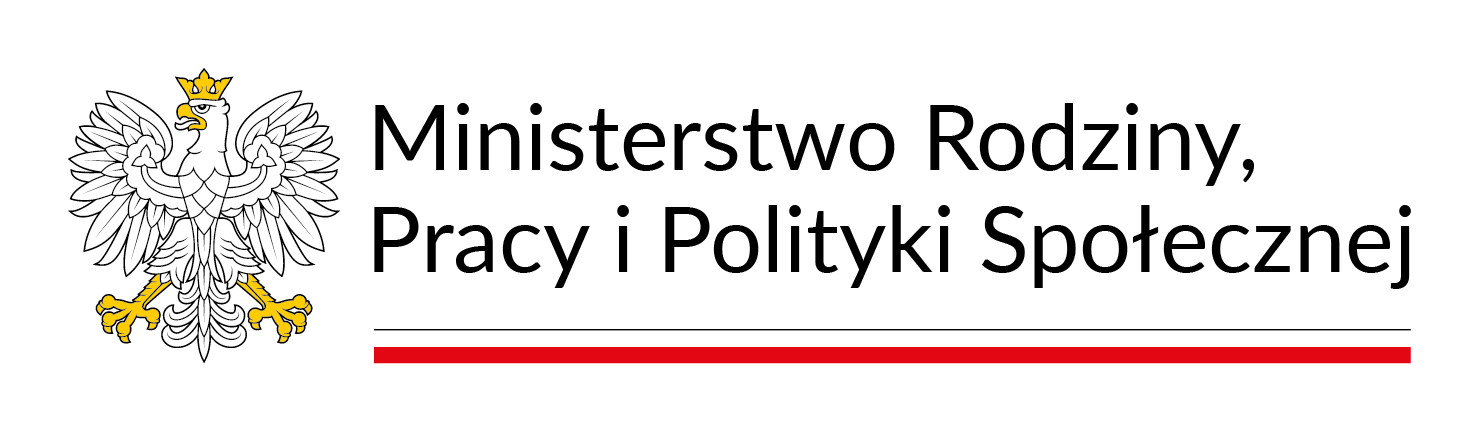
- Ministerial logotype

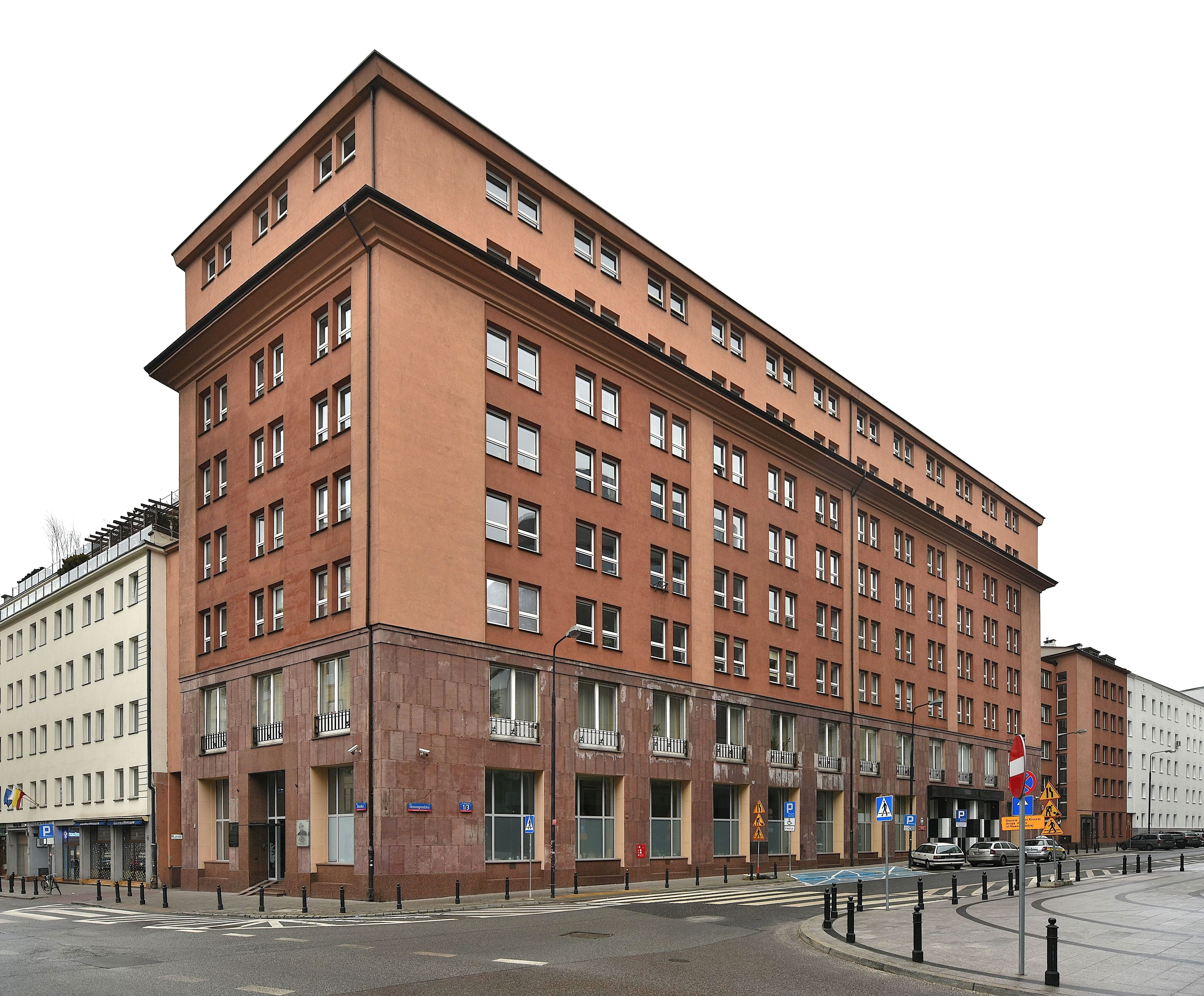
- Ministry headquarters at Nowogrodzka Street

Agency overview
- Formed: 16 November 2015
- Headquarters: ul. Nowogrodzka 1/3/5, Warsaw
- Agency executive: Agnieszka Dziemianowicz-Bąk, Minister of Family, Labour and Social Policy
- Parent agency: Council of Ministers
- Website: www.mpips.gov.pl

Ministry of Family, Labour and Social Policy of the Republic of Poland was formed in 2005 to administer issues related to labour and social policy of Poland. It was named Ministry of Labour and Social Policy until late 2015 when it was renamed to Ministry of Family, Labour and Social Policy.

The ministry was formed from the former and short-lived Ministry of Social Affairs (created from 2004) and still existing, but reduced Ministry of Economy. From the Ministry of Economy, the new ministry acquired the competences in the fields of employment and combating unemployment, relations and conditions of labor, labor-related benefits, and trade union relations. The social policy part of the ministry gives it competences over the issues of family issues, and social benefits and welfare.

The ministry supervises the Zakład Ubezpieczeń Społecznych.

Since December 2023 the current Minister of Labour and Social Policy is Agnieszka Dziemianowicz-Bąk. In April 2024, she appointed a team to reform the National Labour Inspectorate.

== List of ministers ==
Portrait	Name	Party	Term of Office		Prime Minister (cabinet)
	Elżbieta Rafalska	PIS	16 November 2015	4 June 2019	Beata Szydło (Szydło), Mateusz Morawiecki (Morawiecki)
	Bożena Borys-Szopa	PIS	4 June 2019	15 November 2019	Mateusz Morawiecki (Morawiecki)
	Marlena Maląg	PIS	15 November 2019	27 November 2023	Mateusz Morawiecki (Morawiecki II)
	Dorota Bojemska	Independent	27 November 2023	13 December 2023	Mateusz Morawiecki (Morawiecki III)
	Agnieszka Dziemianowicz-Bąk	NL	13 December 2023	Present	Donald Tusk (Tusk III)
