= P. and S. v. Poland =

P. and S. v. Poland is a decision by the European Court of Human Rights in which the court ruled that the state of Poland had improperly hindered a 14-year-old girl in Lublin, P., from her right to an abortion. The other plaintiff in the case was S., her mother, born in 1974.

P. had become pregnant in 2008. Polish law allows abortion if the pregnancy is the consequence of a criminal act. In accordance with the law, on 20 May 2008, P. received a certificate from the public prosecutor attesting that she could get an abortion because she was fourteen, and sexual intercourse with minors below the age of fifteen is a crime. P. and S. went to two hospitals in Lublin to have an abortion performed, but the hospitals refused. A gynecologist at one of the hospitals brought her to see a Roman Catholic priest without asking her permission, and the priest urged her not to have an abortion. Following an argument with S., the gynecologist refused to perform the abortion. Hospital officials issued a press release about the case, following which P.'s situation was nationally debated. After her case became publicly known, P. was harassed by anti-abortion activists.

P. and S. then went to a hospital in Warsaw. Doctors there expressed reluctance to perform the procedure, stating that they were under pressure not to do so. P. and S. were then taken in for police questioning, and S. accused of attempting to force P. to have an abortion. P. was then placed in a juvenile shelter, and authorities began proceedings to take custody of the girl away from S. After a complaint by S. to the Ministry of Health, P. was allowed to have an abortion in Gdańsk.

The European Court of Human Rights ruled that Poland had violated Article 3 of the European Convention on Human Rights, the "prohibition of inhuman or degrading treatment". The court stated that P.'s difficulties increased due to "the lack of a clear legal framework, procrastination of medical staff and also as result of harassment". The decision went on to note that "[t]he court was particularly struck that the authorities started criminal proceedings for illicit sexual relations against the adolescent who, according to the prosecutor and medical reports, should have been considered the victim of sexual abuse". Poland was ordered to pay €15,000 to P. and €30,000 to S., and €16,000 to each for court costs.

Following the ruling, Amnesty International urged Poland to "take urgent steps to ensure women and girls have full access to sexual and reproductive health". The Irish Times stated that the decision had implications for Ireland, which had a pending case regarding a failure to provide a legal framework for abortion.

== See also ==
- Abortion in Poland
