= Super Express (newspaper) =

Polish tabloid

- November 2009 issue of the newspaper
- Type: Daily newspaper
- Format: Compact
- Owner: ZPR Media Group
- Editor-in-chief: Grzegorz Zasępa
- Founded: 22 November 1991; 34 years ago
- Political alignment: Center-left; Populism
- Language: Polish
- Headquarters: Warsaw, Poland
- Circulation: 69,499 (2023)
- Website: www.se.pl

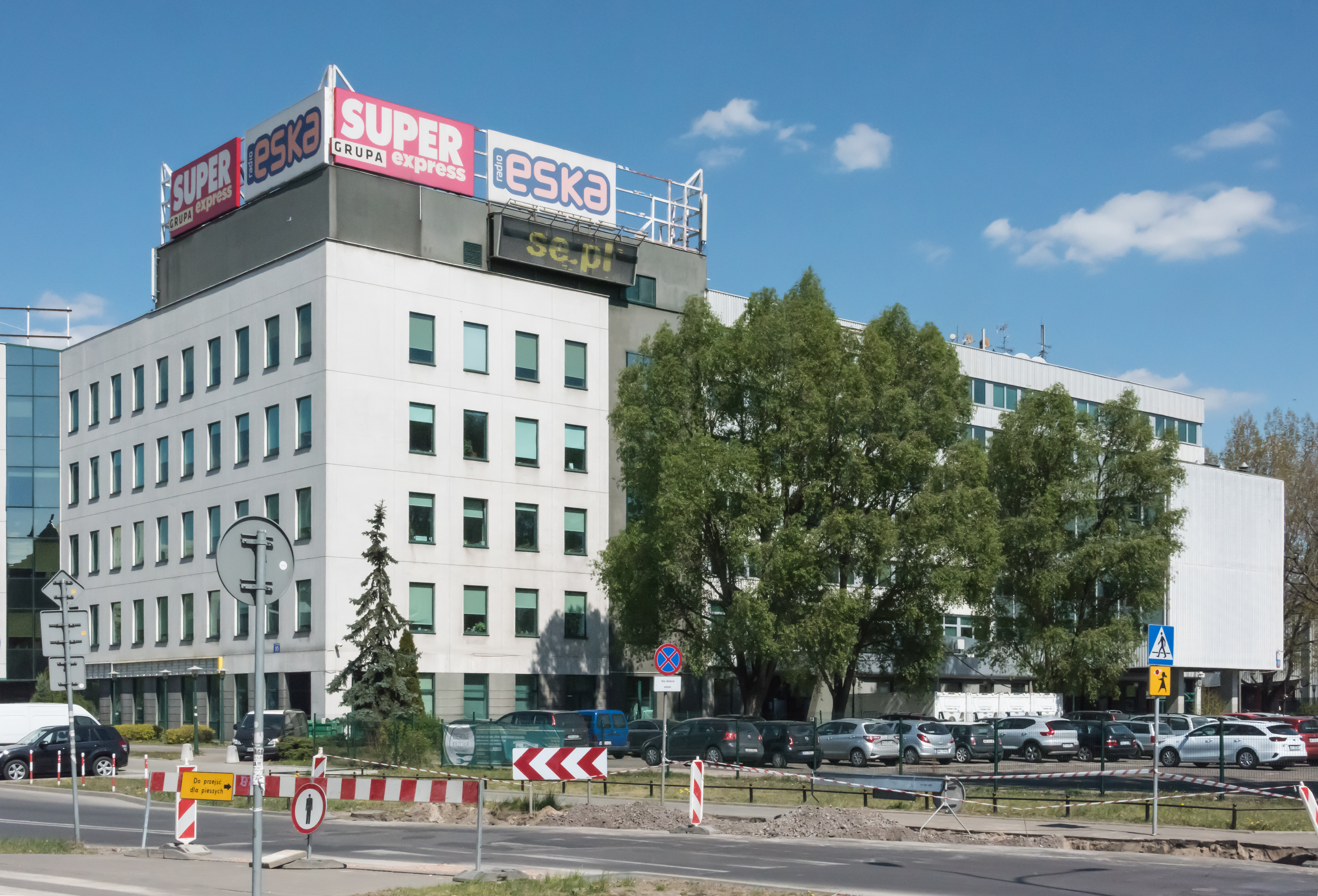
Newspaper headquarters at 10 Jubilerska Street in Warsaw

Super Express is a Polish tabloid published in Warsaw with daily circulation of about 370,000.

== History ==
Super Express was established in 1991. The paper, owned and published by the Media Express, is best known for publications about political scandals. The former owners of the paper were Bonnier and ZPR Express, each held 50%.

Before the 1993 and 1995 elections in Poland Super Express published pre-election polls, although there's a 24-hour time period without media information about politics. The paper published also photos of Polish Television (TVP) war-correspondent Waldemar Milewicz's body after he was killed by the Iraqi insurgents.

For the first decade of its operation (until 2003) Super Express ranked as second in Poland in terms of the quality of information and sale results, behind the leading Gazeta Wyborcza. The editorial profile of SE changed for a few years to a more competitive format after the introduction of Fakt published by German conglomerate Axel Springer AG, which became the most popular Polish daily. Since 2007, with the new editor-in-chief formerly from Fakt, Super Express adjusted its profile to become (similar to Fakt) "a noble version of the tabloid daily" with a wide range of readership.

== Criticism ==
The newspaper came under criticism from the Bundestag, the German parliament after publishing a photo-montage picturing Poland national football team coach Leo Beenhakker carrying the severed heads of Germany national team head coach Joachim Löw and captain Michael Ballack in the buildup of their UEFA Euro 2008 Group B opener against the Germans in Klagenfurt (Austria). Peter Danckert, head of the Bundestag's sport committee, called upon the Sejm, the Polish parliament, to take appropriate action on Super Express, labelling the issue a scandal. Beenhakker has since distanced himself from the image, calling the people who put together the spread named "bring us their heads" "sick".

== Circulation ==
Super Express had a circulation of 386,000 copies during the first three quarters of 1998. The circulation of the paper was 353,882 copies between January and February 2001.

== Editorial board ==
- Editor-in-chief, Grzegorz Zasępa
- Co-editors, Stanisław Drozdowski, Małgorzata Guss-Gasińska, Hubert Biskupski
- Senior art director, Piotr Dąbrowski
- Senior editor, Krzysztof Bogus
- Politics, Grzegorz Zasępa
- Opinions, Tadeusz Płużański
- International news, Marcin Kowalczyk
- City news, Dagmara Kijanowska
- Sports, Andrzej Kostyra
- Celebrity news, Sławomir Kowalski
- Photography, Andrzej Lange

== American editions ==
Since 15 April 1996 an edition of Super Express has been published for Polish-Americans; the first time that any publication from Poland issued its own separate version overseas. Adam Michejda served as its main editor between 2008 and 2013, who had earlier served as an associate editor in Poland. Its New York offices are located in Manhattan, on John Street in the vicinity of the World Trade Center. A Chicago version has also been issued since September 2010. The publisher of both publications is Super Express USA and its president is Beata Pierzchała.

== See also ==
- List of newspapers in Poland
