= Halina Olendzka =

Polish politician (born 1945)

Member of the Sejm
- Incumbent
- Assumed office 25 September 2005
- Constituency: 33 – Kielce

Personal details
- Born: 31 August 1945 (age 80)
- Party: Law and Justice

Halina Bronisława Olendzka (born 31 August 1945 in Święta Katarzyna) is a Polish politician. She was elected to the Sejm on 25 September 2005, getting 5386 votes in 33 Kielce district as a candidate from the Law and Justice list.

== See also ==
- Members of Polish Sejm 2005-2007
