= Rodzina 800 plus =

Polish state social policy program

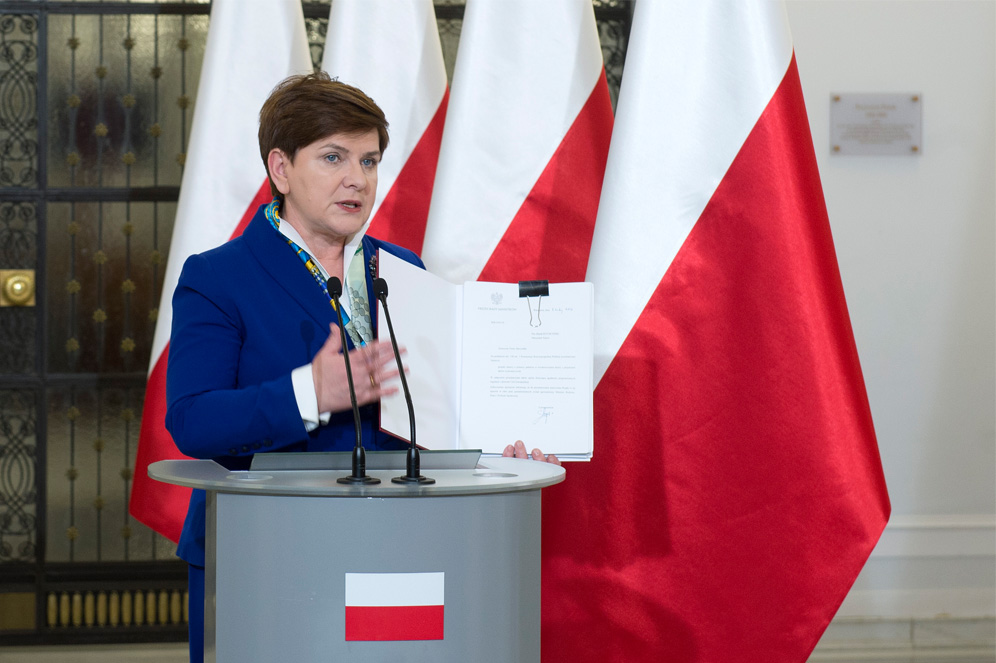
Prime Minister Beata Szydło at a press conference held to mark the submission by the Council of Ministers to the Sejm of a bill introducing the "Rodzina 500 plus" program.

Rodzina 800 plus (lit. Family 800 plus) is a state social policy programme implemented in Poland since 1 April 2016, aimed at helping families raise their children by providing monthly childcare benefits for each child in the family in the amount of PLN 800 (until 2024 the amount was PLN 500). The intention to create the programme was announced in 2014 by the Law and Justice party, and following its victory in the 2015 parliamentary elections, it was further developed and implemented by the government of Beata Szydło.

== Implementation ==
Initially, the programme applied only to second and subsequent children. However, families with low incomes could also receive funding for their first child if their monthly income was below PLN 800 netto or PLN 1,200 in case of a disabled child. On 1 July 2019, the programme was expanded to include every child up to the age of 18, regardless of family income and whether the child was the first, second, or subsequent child.

Beneficiaries of the Welfare spending are the parents, legal guardians, or actual guardians of a child (biological or adopted). The child benefit amounts to PLN 800 and is not subject to taxation. There is no income criterion for granting benefits for the second and subsequent children in the family. The benefits cover children up to the age of 18.

Jarosław Kaczyński announced at a party convention that the benefit would be raised. President Andrzej Duda signed the law on August 7, 2023, raising the Family 500 Plus benefit to PLN 800 per child beginning January 1, 2024, after the Polish Parliament passed an amendment on July 7, 2023.

== Costs ==
In 2016, 17 billion PLN was allocated from the state budget to the programme. This amount increased to 31 billion PLN in 2019, 70 billion PLN in 2024, and 62.8 billion PLN in 2025.

== Opinions ==
=== Positive opinions ===
One of the most significant positive outcomes of the programme was the reduction of child poverty, which was its primary objective, as well as the improvement of living standards and comfort. Data from the Central Statistical Office of Poland (GUS) indicate that in 2015, 9% of children lived in households with expenditures below the extreme poverty threshold. After the programme’s implementation, this percentage decreased to 4.7% in 2017 but rose again to 6% in 2018. Prof. Ryszard Szarfenberg noted that compared to 2014, extreme child poverty had been reduced by more than half (54%). Studies also show that families benefiting from the 500+ programme are more likely to invest in their children’s education, participate in extracurricular activities, and improve their daily living conditions.

In 2016, Beata Szydło's government received the European Confederation of Large Families (ELFAC) Award, for its outstanding achievements in family-friendly policy, particularly for the "Rodzina 500+" program.

In 2017, Elżbieta Rafalska received the Grzegorz Palka Prize for implementing the Rodzina 500+ together with local governments and the prize of the Spanish Platform of Families Catalonia-UN in the international category for implementing the Rodzina 500+ programme as an important instrument for promoting the family.

== Negative opinions ==
Another reported effect of the program is the change in citizens' expectations regarding social benefits. This translates into the need to promise increasingly higher cash transfers during election campaigns in order to win elections. In February 2014, then Prime Minister Donald Tusk accused Law and Justice of not presenting funding possibilities for the "Rodzina 500 plus" program and assessed that, "there is no possibility to finance this project."

Similar accusations about the lack of funding possibilities for this program were made in October 2015 by Jacek Rostowski, economist and former Finance Minister in Donald Tusk's government.

== Similar benefits in other countries ==
Since January 2018, the Lithuanian government has introduced monthly benefits for each child under 18 or studying until the age of 21, amounting to 30 euros. . For children from families with at least three children and families with incomes below the income threshold, the benefit is 58.5 euros. The program was introduced at the initiative of the Electoral Action of Poles in Lithuania – the Union of Christian Families, which proposed a benefit of 120 euros (equivalent to 500 zlotys), but this was reduced in the final draft due to a lack of budgetary funds.
