= Security Action for Europe =

European Union fund

SAFE
- Security Action for Europe (SAFE) through the Reinforcement of the European Defence Industry Instrument
- Member states shown in green (EU) and orange (Canada)
- Abbreviation: SAFE
- Formation: 27 May 2025; 17 months ago
- Type: EU financial instrument for defense spending
- Region served: North Atlantic
- Members: European Union; Canada

Security Action for Europe (SAFE) is a European Union program created in 2025 to facilitate joint purchases of arms and military equipment in the context of strengthening Europe's strategic autonomy and the 2020s European rearmament. This organization was set up to grant loans at preferential rates to EU member states. It only intervenes if a project involves several countries, including at least one EU member state, and if the proposed weapons systems contain at least 65% European components.

It is a European Union financial instrument, adopted in May 2025, designed to provide up to €150 billion in long‑term loans to EU member states for defence procurement and capability development. Its primary goals are to strengthen the European Defence Technological and Industrial Base, close critical capability gaps, promote joint procurement, and increase the EU’s strategic autonomy in response to evolving security threats, including the war in Ukraine. SAFE funds can support a wide range of military assets, from air and naval systems to drones, cyber capabilities, and military mobility, with the condition that most procurement is sourced within the EU, EEA‑EFTA, or Ukraine. Voluntary for member states, the program is overseen by a dedicated Special Group, and is part of the broader EU defence strategy “Readiness 2030.” While SAFE is hailed as a historic step in EU defence financing, it has raised debates on democratic oversight, potential budget substitution, and procurement flexibility.

== History ==
Throughout its history, the European Investment Bank (EIB) has regularly taken the initiative to finance military projects in Europe. At the beginning of 2025, EU member states began calling for the creation of a separate fund and a European rearmament bank.

SAFE is an initiative stemming from the White Paper for European Defence and the ReArm Europe Plan/Readiness 2030 and will be able to start with initial funding of €150 billion, which is expected to reach €200 billion later in 2025. Public and private contributions are being sought to reach the target of €800 billion.

SAFE is also seen as a tool for achieving NATO's financial goal, the 5% budget standard per country, as defined at the 2025 The Hague NATO summit in The Hague, Netherlands.

In May 2025, the European Council announced the final approval of the SAFE instrument at a General Affairs Council (GAC) meeting, with only Hungary abstaining, including a €150 billion loan package for joint purchases of military equipment.

In December 2025, Canada signed an agreement with the European Union to join the SAFE initiative. It is the first non-European country to participate in the program. This agreement gives Canadian defense companies greater access to European markets. Previously, Canada had joined ReArm Europe, a European defense initiative.

== See also ==
- 2020s European rearmament
- European Sky Shield Initiative
- Readiness 2030
- Strategic Compass for Security and Defence
